= List of quadcopters =

This is a list of quadcopters, including vertical take-off and landing (VTOL) airplanes that use quadrotor systems for vertical lift.

== Unmanned ==
Quadcopter	Manufacturer	Image	Origin	Type/role	Year	Notes
Bitcraze Crazyflie 2.0	Bitcraze			Open-source development platform	2014	
Antigravity A1	Antigravity		China	Camera drone	2025	
Asisguard Songar	Asisguard		Turkey	Unmanned combat aerial vehicle	2019	
Autel Evo	Autel Robotics		China	Camera drone	2021	
Bayraktar KALKAN	Baykar		Turkey	Surveillance and reconnaissance drone	2022	
Baykar Cezeri	Baykar		Turkey	Experimental aircraft	2020	
DJI Agras	DJI		China	Agricultural drone	2020	Previously released in 2015 as an octocopter. Hexacopter variants also exist.
DJI Air	DJI		China	Camera drone	2018	
DJI Avata	DJI		China	FPV drone	2022	
DJI Flip	DJI		China	Camera drone	2025	
DJI Inspire	DJI		China	Camera drone	2014	
DJI Lito	DJI		China	Camera drone	2026	
DJI Matrice	DJI		China	Camera drone	2015	Hexacopter variants also exist.
DJI Mavic	DJI		China	Camera drone	2016	
DJI Mini	DJI		China	Camera drone	2019	
DJI Neo	DJI		China	Camera drone	2024	
DJI Phantom	DJI		China	Camera drone	2013	
DJI Spark	DJI		China	Camera drone	2017	
DRDO Bharat	DRDO		India	Surveillance drone		
First Contact Osa	First Contact		Ukraine	Suicide drone		
GoPro Karma	GoPro		United States	Camera drone	2016	
Hubsan X4	Hubsan		China	Radio-controlled aircraft	2012	
Intel Shooting Star	Intel		United States	Light show drone	2016	
Nixie Labs Nixie	Nixie Labs			Wearable camera drone		
Parrot Anafi	Parrot		France	Camera drone	2018	
Parrot AR.Drone	Parrot		France	Camera drone	2010	
Parrot Bebop	Parrot		France	Camera drone	2014	
Ryze Tello	Ryze Tech / DJI		China	Camera/educational drone	2018	
Skydio R1	Skydio		United States	Camera drone	2019	
Skydio 2	Skydio		United States	Camera drone	2019	
Skydio X2	Skydio		United States	Camera drone	2020	
Skydio X10	Skydio		United States	Camera drone	2023	
Skydio R10	Skydio		United States	Camera drone	2025	
STM Kargu	STM		Turkey	Loitering munition	2017	
Torquing Zano	Torquing Group		United Kingdom	Camera drone		Not built

== Manned ==
Quadcopter	Manufacturer	Image	Origin	Type/role	Year	Notes
Aerotechnik WGM.21	Aerotechnik		Czechoslovakia		1969	
AeroVelo Atlas	AeroVelo		Canada	Human-powered helicopter	2012	
Beta Technologies Alia	Beta Technologies		United States	Utility aircraft	2020	eVTOL airplane. Also built in traditional airplane configuration.
Bell Boeing Quad TiltRotor	Bell / Boeing		United States	Cargo aircraft		Tiltrotor; design study
Breguet-Richet Gyroplane	Breguet Aviation		France	Experimental aircraft	1907	
Curtiss-Wright VZ-7	Curtiss-Wright		United States	Utility aircraft	1950s	
Curtiss-Wright X-19	Curtiss-Wright		United States	Experimental aircraft	1963	Tiltrotor
de Bothezat helicopter	George de Bothezat		United States	Experimental aircraft	1922	
Malloy Hoverbike	Chris Malloy		New Zealand	Hoverbike	2006	
Piasecki PA-97 Helistat	Piasecki Aircraft		United States	Heavy-lift aircraft	1986	
SkyHook JHL-40	SkyHook International / Boeing		Canada / United States	Heavy-lift aircraft	2008	Proposal
University of Maryland Gamera I	University of Maryland, College Park		United States	Human-powered helicopter	2011	
University of Maryland Gamera II	University of Maryland, College Park		United States	Human-powered helicopter	2012	
University of Maryland Solar Gamera	University of Maryland, College Park		United States	Solar-powered aircraft	2016	

== See also ==
- List of rotorcraft
- List of unmanned aerial vehicles
- Multirotor
- Unmanned aerial vehicle
