= Skydio R10 =

American camera drone

General information
- Type: Camera drone
- National origin: United States
- Manufacturer: Skydio

History
- Manufactured: 2025-present
- Introduction date: September 2025

The Skydio R10 is an American teleoperated quadcopter drone produced by Skydio.

== Design and development ==
The R10 was announced alongside the Skydio F10 in September 2025. Designed to be an indoor counterpart to the Skydio X10 for first responders, the R10 has a compact composite frame with built-in propeller guards, measuring 10 in × 10 in (25 cm × 25 cm) in length and width and weighing 1.7 lb (0.77 kg). The drone is equipped with a 12.5-megapixel camera with a 1" sensor. The R10 has a NightSense zero-light obstacle avoidance system and a forward visual navigation system utilizing two Samsung 1/2.8" 32MP CMOS sensors, and is designed to be operated with minimal training. The drone also has a two-way audio system with a built-in 82 dB speaker for crisis negotiation. The R10 is powered by a 6000 mAh battery, giving the drone a flight time of 20 minutes. It is also capable of perching for up to three hours. The R10 has a "turtle mode" feature, which flips the drone upright in the event it lands inverted.

== Specifications (Skydio R10) ==
Data from Skydio

General characteristics

- Length: 10.35 in (0.2630 m)
- Width: 10.26 in (0.2605 m)
- Height: 2.42 in (0.0615 m)
- Empty weight: 1.73 lb (0.785 kg)
- Battery: 14.4V 6000 mAh (86.4 Wh) lithium-ion battery
- Propellers: 0 ft 4 in (0.10 m) diameter

Performance

- Maximum speed: 27 mph (43.2 km/h, 23 kn)
- Endurance: 20 minutes
- Service ceiling: 10,000 ft (3,000 m) above sea level
- Rate of climb: 792 ft/min (4.0 m/s)
- Maximum wind resistance: 22 mph (36 km/h)
- Operating temperature: -4°F (-20°C) to 122°F (50°C)

Avionics

- Camera: 12.5MP 1" CMOS camera
- Processor: Qualcomm Snapdragon 865
- Encryption: AES-128 or AES-256

== See also ==
- History of unmanned aerial vehicles

Aircraft of comparable role, configuration, and era

- DJI Avata
- DJI Mavic
- Skydio R1

Related lists

- List of unmanned aerial vehicles
