= Skydio 2 =

American camera drone

General information
- Type: Camera drone
- National origin: United States
- Manufacturer: Skydio; AeroArc

History
- Manufactured: 2019–present
- Introduction date: October 2019
- Developed into: Skydio X2

The Skydio 2 is an American teleoperated compact quadcopter drone produced by Skydio. Released in October 2019, the Skydio 2 competed with Chinese drones such as the DJI Mavic until Skydio pulled out of the consumer market in 2023. However, it continues to be produced for enterprise customers.

== Design and development ==
The Skydio 2 was released in October 2019 with a much lower price than its predecessor, the Skydio R1. Compared to the R1, the Skydio 2 has a smaller form factor, though it does not fold like some competing models, and an improved obstacle avoidance system with six 4K navigation cameras instead of 12. The drone is fully autonomous, though it can be controlled manually with either the Skydio app or an optional beacon or remote controller, respectively having a range of 200 m (660 ft), 1.5 km (0.93 mi), and 3.5 km (2.2 mi). The drone also has a gimbal stabilized main camera capable of 4K video at 60 frames per second and is powered by a 4280 mAh battery, giving it a flight time of 23 minutes. The Skydio 2 is powered by the NVIDIA Jetson TX2 embedded computing board, allowing the drone to track up to 10 objects while flying at 36 mph (58 km/h).

Reviewers in PCMag praised the obstacle avoidance feature, but criticized the camera quality and wireless range. DIYPhotography noted that the Skydio 2's top speed and range fell short of the competing DJI Mavic 2.

In January 2022, Skydio announced an improved version of the drone as the Skydio 2+. The Skydio 2+ addressed the range issues of its predecessor by adding two 5GHz WiFi antennas on top of the front arms, increasing the range to 3 km (1.9 mi) with a beacon or 6 km (3.7 mi) with a controller. Likewise, battery capacity was increased by 20%, resulting in an increased flight time of 27 minutes.

In August 2023, Skydio pulled out of the consumer drone business to focus on providing drones for enterprise customers, including the Skydio 2+ and Skydio X2. Flying called the decision "unexpected", though also noting that the company was reportedly losing money with each consumer sale.

== Variants ==
Skydio 2
Original variant with gimbal stabilized 4K main camera, six 4K navigation cameras, an NVIDIA Jetson TX2 embedded computing board, a maximum wireless range of 3.5 km (2.2 mi), and powered by a 4280 mAh giving it a flight time of 23 minutes. Released in October 2019.
Skydio 2+
Improved Skydio 2 with two 5GHz WiFi antennas and battery capacity increased by 20%, increasing wireless range and flight time to 6 km (3.7 mi) and 27 minutes, respectively. Released in January 2022.
Trinetra S
Variant produced in India by AeroArc.

== Operators ==
United States

- Chula Vista Police Department became the first law enforcement operator of the Skydio 2 in December 2019.

== Specifications (Skydio 2+) ==
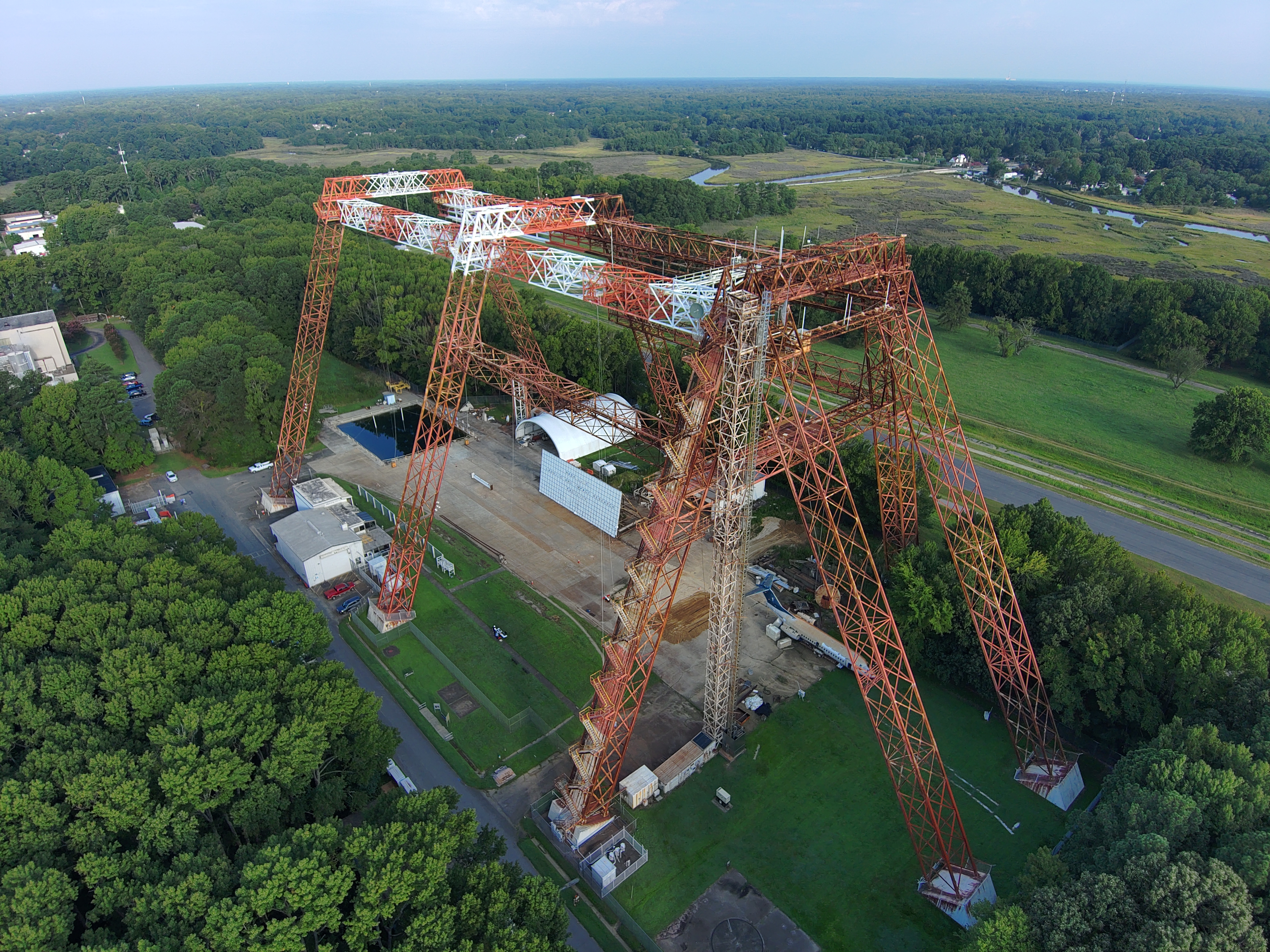
Aerial image of the Landing and Impact Research Facility at Langley Research Center, taken with a Skydio 2.

Data from Skydio 2/2+ Operator Manual

General characteristics

- Length: 8.8 in (0.223 m)
- Width: 10.7 in (0.273 m)
- Height: 2.9 in (0.074 m) with battery
- Empty weight: 2 lb (0.775 kg) with battery

Performance

- Maximum speed: 36 mph (58 km/h, 31 kn)
- Range: 3.7 mi (6.0 km, 3.2 nmi) with controller
- Endurance: 27 minutes
- Service ceiling: 15,000 ft (4,600 m) above sea level
- Maximum wind resistance: 25 mph (40 km/h)
- Operating temperature: 23–104 °F (−5–40 °C)

Avionics

- Cameras:

- 12.3MP Sony IMX577 1/2.3" CMOS main camera
- 6× 4K Sony 1/3" CMOS navigation cameras

- GNSS compatibility: GPS and GLONASS
- Processors:

- NVIDIA Tegra X2 main processor
- NVIDIA Denver 2 64-bit CPU
- NVIDIA Pascal 256-core GPU

== See also ==
- History of unmanned aerial vehicles

Related development

- Skydio X2

Aircraft of comparable role, configuration, and era

- Autel Evo
- DJI Mavic

Related lists

- List of unmanned aerial vehicles
