= Skydio X2 =

American camera drone

X2
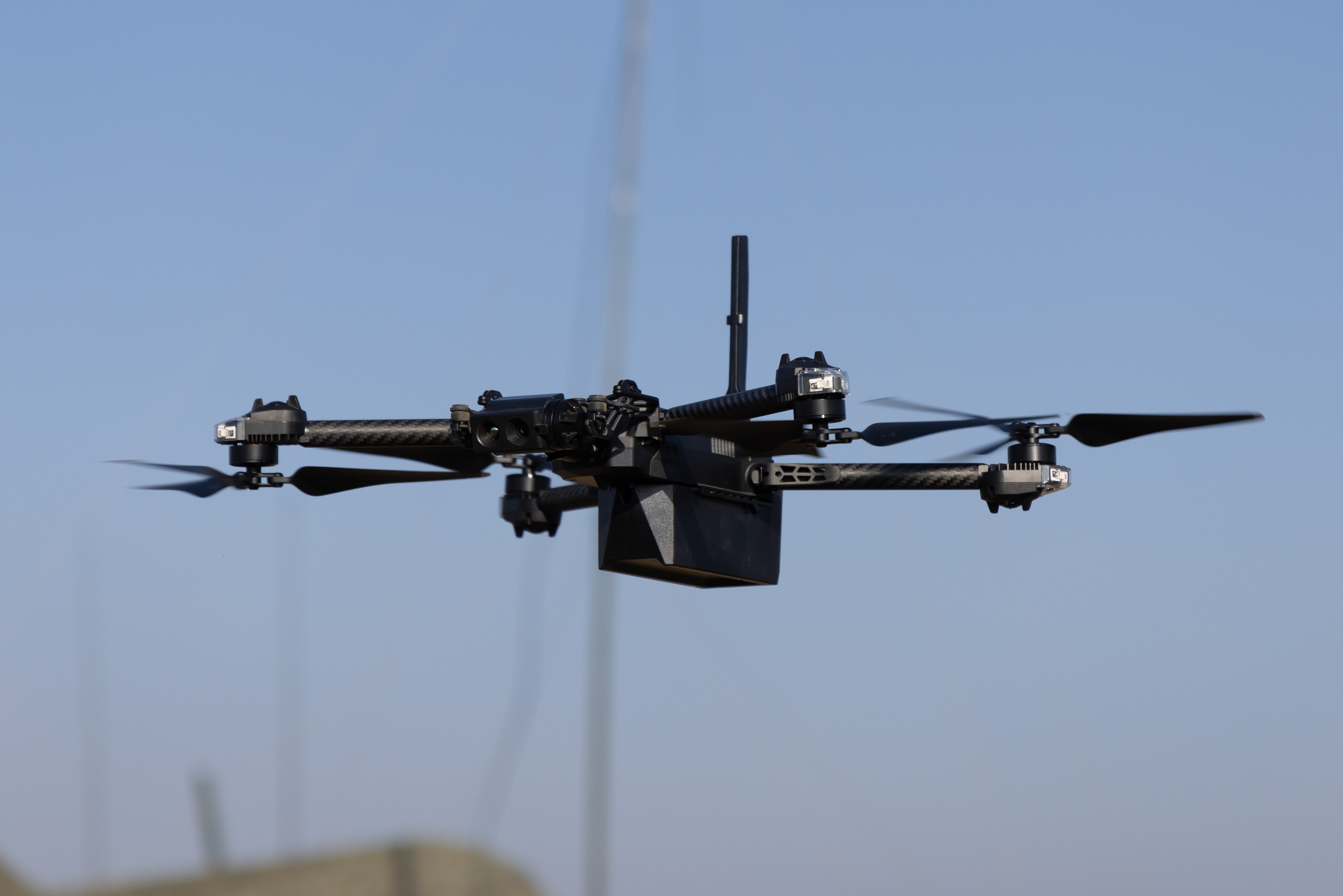
- Skydio X2D in flight

General information
- Type: Camera drone
- National origin: United States
- Manufacturer: Skydio; AeroArc
- Primary users: United States Armed Forces Indian Army; Aerorozvidka; New Zealand Army

History
- Manufactured: 2020–present
- Introduction date: July 2020
- Developed from: Skydio 2

The Skydio X2 is an American teleoperated compact quadcopter drone produced by Skydio. Introduced in July 2020, the X2 is intended for both military and civilian use and has also been produced in India by AeroArc.

== Design and development ==
In 2020, Skydio announced the X2 series as an enlarged derivative of the Skydio 2 consumer drone for military and corporate use. Compared to the Skydio 2, the X2 features a strengthened carbon fiber airframe with folding arms. Flight time was increased to 35 minutes; up from the 23 minutes of its consumer counterpart. The X2 was initially released in two models; the X2D for military and government use and the X2E for first responders and civilian users. Both models were offered with two different camera configurations, designated Color and Color/Thermal. The Color/Thermal model features a FLIR Boson thermal camera with 8x digital zoom and a 12-megapixel color high-dynamic-range (HDR) camera with a ≈46-degree field of view (FOV), 16x digital zoom, and capable of shooting 4K video at 60 frames per second. The Color model removed the thermal camera, while the color camera was upgraded with an 80-degree FOV. The cameras are mounted on a gimbal with 180 degrees of vertical motion. The X2 series also has built-invisible and infrared lights, allowing it to capture video in low-light conditions. The drone also features six navigation cameras which are used for collision avoidance during daytime flights, while a GPS is used for navigation at night. The X2 has an Nvidia Tegra X2 chip, allowing the drone to use its seven visual cameras to autonomously create 3D point maps.

An upgraded model of the thermal camera-equipped X2D was announced in May 2023 as the X2D Multiband. Compared to its predecessor, the Multiband is capable of operating on multiple frequencies, allowing it to overcome bandwidth limitations and interference.

In June 2023, Skydio released a software update for several of its civilian drones, including the X2E, which enabled them to broadcast Remote ID signals.

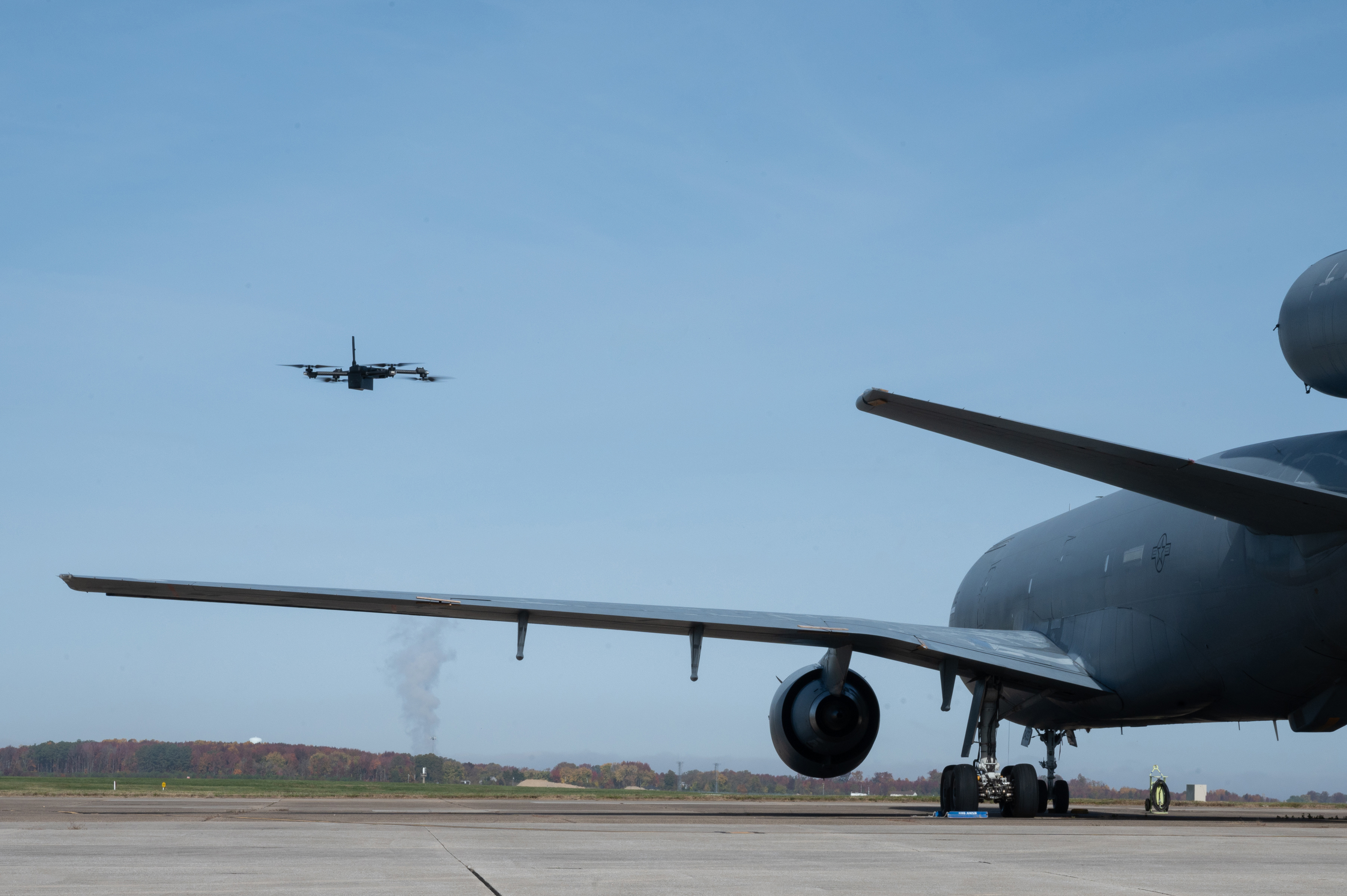
Skydio X2D belonging to the 436th Mission Generation Group inspecting a McDonnell Douglas KC-10 Extender at Dover AFB.

== Variants ==
X2D
Also known as the X2 Defense. Intended for military and government use. Includes the following models:
- X2D ATO and X2D INTL: Baseline X2D equipped with either a 12MP color HDR camera with an 80-degree FOV or a 12MP color HDR camera with a ≈46-degree FOV and a FLIR Boson thermal camera.
- X2D Multiband: As thermal camera-equipped X2D but with the capablity to operate on multiple frequencies.
- RQ-28A: Short-range reconnaissance (SRR) variant of the X2D for the United States Army. The first 30 were delivered in September 2022, and another 480 were slated for delivery in 2023.
- Trinetra: "Indianised" variant of the X2D built by AeroArc. The Trinetra features many improvements over the original X2D which allow it to operate at more extreme temperatures and higher altitudes. The drone also has two thermal cameras. Nearly 700 drones were ordered by the Indian Army in late 2024.
  - Trinetra D: Defense variant of the Trinetra.
  - Trinetra E: Enterprise variant of the Trinetra.
X2E
Also known as the X2 Enterprise. Intended for first responders and civilian users. Includes the following models:
- X2E Color: X2E equipped with a 12MP color HDR camera with an 80-degree FOV.
- X2E Color/Thermal: X2E equipped with a 12MP color HDR camera with a ≈46-degree FOV and a FLIR Boson thermal camera.

== Operators ==
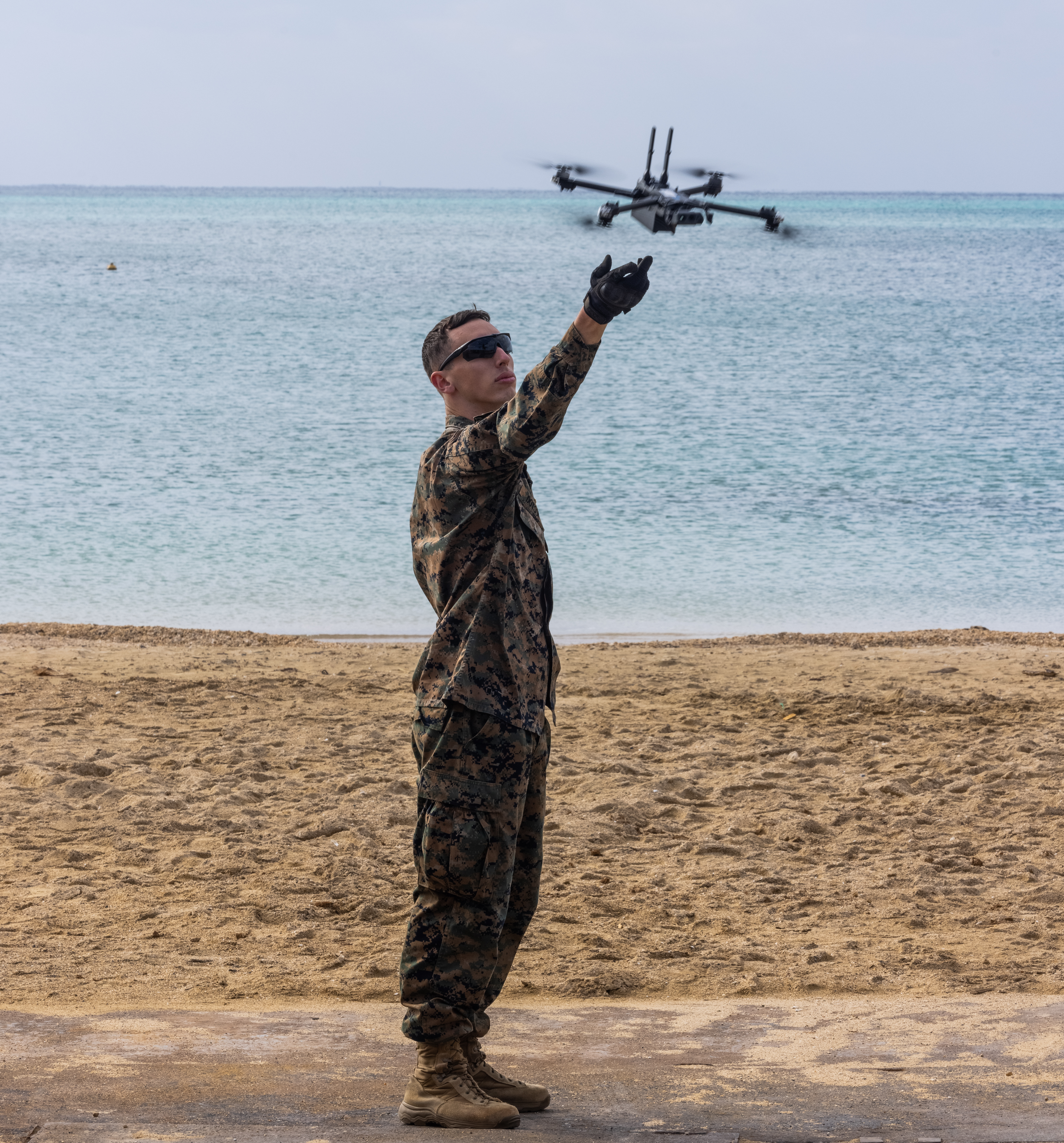
Soldier of the 5th Air Naval Gunfire Liaison Company hand launching a Skydio X2D during a training exercise in 2025.

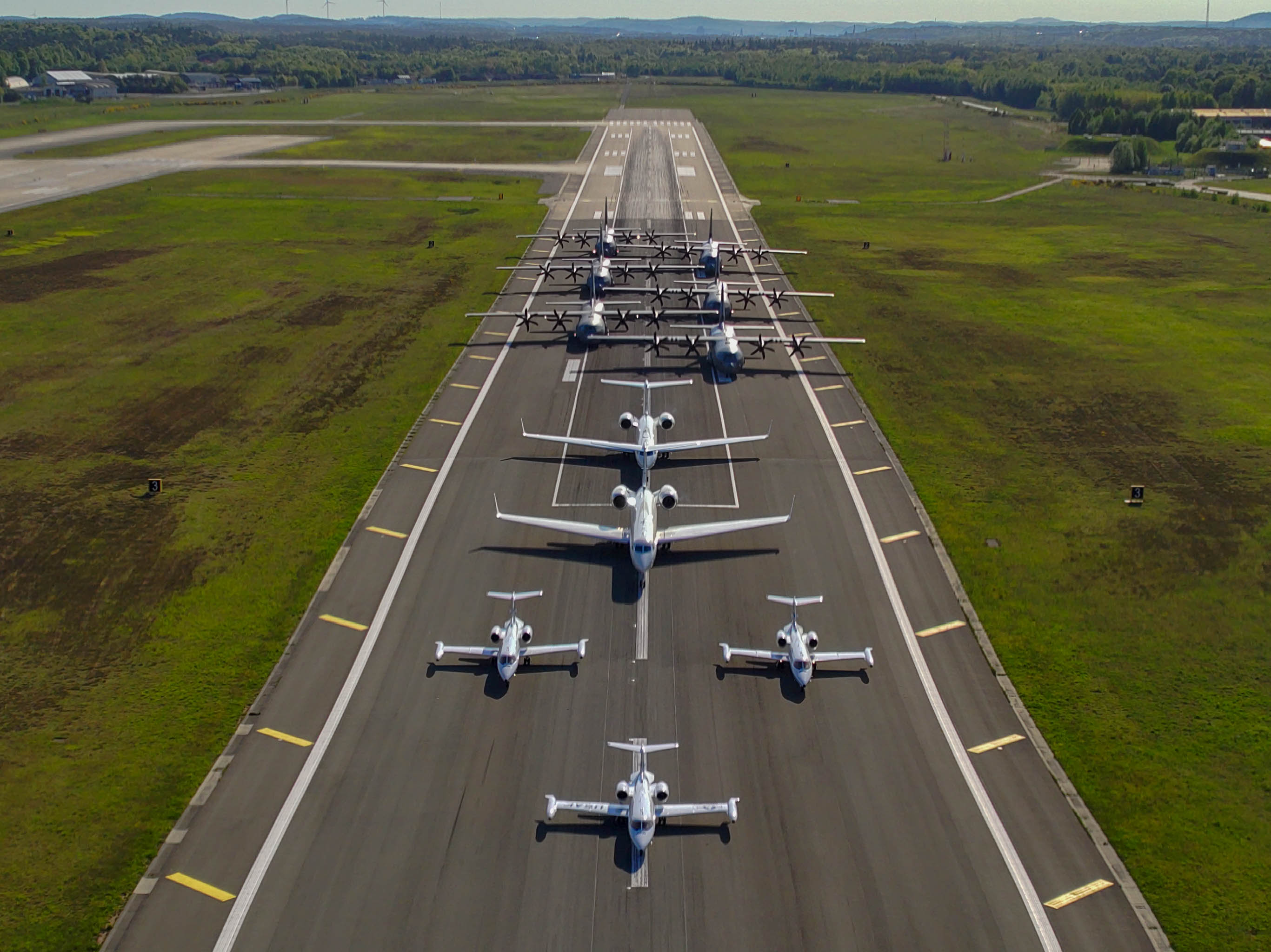
Aerial photo of an elephant walk of (foreground to background) three C-21As, two C-37As, and six C-130Js taken by a US Air Force Skydio X2D at Ramstein Air Base.

=== Law enforcement operators ===
United States

- The Las Vegas Metropolitan Police Department used several Skydio X2s prior to the introduction of the Skydio X10. The drone was noted to have "[fallen] short of what [the LVMPD] needed operationally."
- The New York City Police Department uses X2 alongside X10s to combat subway surfing.

=== Military operators ===
India

- The Indian Army ordered nearly 700 locally-built Trinetra derivatives of the X2D in late 2024.

New Zealand

- In December 2023, it was reported that the New Zealand Army would take delivery of the X2D in 2024.

Ukraine

- By June 2022, Skydio had donated dozens of X2 drones to the Ministry of Defence, and hundreds more were sold to supporters of Ukraine who reportedly funneled them to Aerorozvidka for use against the Russian invasion.

United Kingdom
The Ministry of Defence awarded Skydio a £3 million contract for X2D drones in June 2022.
United States

- The United States Air Force began using the X2D Multiband for aircraft inspection training in July 2024.
- The United States Army selected the X2D for use as a short-range reconnaissance (SRR) platform in February 2022. The drone was given the Tri-Service designation RQ-28A, and the first 30 drones were delivered to the Small UAS Master Trainer Schoolhouse at Fort Benning in September of that year. An additional 480 RQ-28As were expected to be delivered in 2023. As of May 2025, the US Army plans to replace the RQ-28A with the Skydio X10D by 2026.
- The United States Marine Corps replaced the fixed-wing AeroVironment RQ-11 Raven and RQ-12 Wasp III with the VTOL UAVs, including the Skydio X2D and FLIR R80D SkyRaider, by January 2023.
- The 133rd Security Forces Squadron of the Minnesota National Guard certified eight airmen to fly the X2D in November 2023, becoming the first US National Guard unit to do so.

== Specifications (Skydio X2D INTL, thermal camera) ==
Data from Skydio X2D INTL Operator Manual

General characteristics

- Length: 1 ft 10.4 in (0.569 m)
- Width: 2 ft 2.1 in (0.663 m)
- Height: 8.3 in (0.211 m)
- Empty weight: 3 lb (1.325 kg) with battery
- Max takeoff weight: 3 lb (1.525 kg)

Performance

- Maximum speed: 31 mph (50 km/h, 27 kn)
- Endurance: Max. 35 minutes
- Service ceiling: 11,200 ft (3,414 m) above mean sea level
- Maximum wind resistance: 23 mph (37 km/h)
- Operating temperature: 14°F (-10°C) to 109°F (43°C)

Avionics

- Cameras:

- 1/2.3" 12.3MP CMOS IMX577 visual spectrum camera
- FLIR Boson infrared spectrum camera
- 6x 1/3" 4K CMOS visual spectrum camera (navigation system)

- GNSS compatibility: GPS, GLONASS
- Processors:

- Nvidia Tegra X2 main processor
- Dual-core Nvidia Denver 2 64-bit CPU
- Quad-core ARM Cortex-A57 CPU
- 256-core Nvidia Pascal GPU

- Encryption: AES-256

== See also ==
- History of unmanned aerial vehicles

Related development

- Skydio 2

Aircraft of comparable role, configuration, and era

- Autel Evo
- DJI Matrice
- DJI Mavic
- GoPro Karma
- Intel Falcon 8
- Parrot Anafi

Related lists

- List of unmanned aerial vehicles
