= DRDO Bharat =

Unmanned aerial vehicle for high-altitude surveillance

Bharat

General information
- Type: Unmanned aerial vehicle (UAV)
- National origin: India
- Primary user: Indian Army

The DRDO Bharat is a light surveillance quadcopter, unmanned aerial vehicle developed by the Defence Research and Development Organization for the Indian Army.

The drone has been created by the Chandigarh-based laboratory of the DRDO for carrying out surveillance in high-altitude areas and mountainous terrain along India's lines of actual control with Pakistan and China.

The drone is built from a single frame (unibody) and is capable of night vision, avoiding radar detection and withstanding cold temperatures.
