= Nixie Labs Nixie =

Nixie
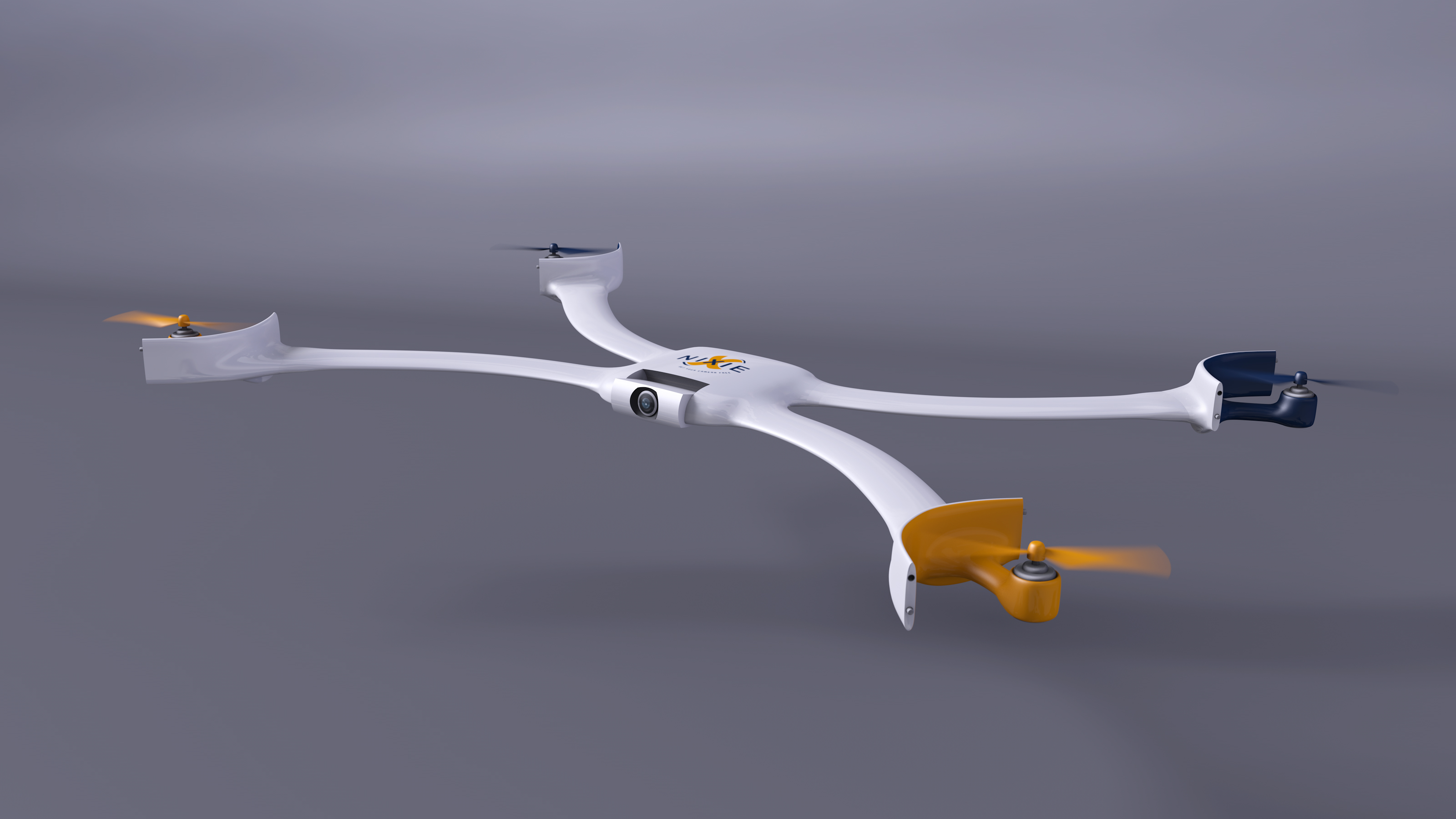
- Nixie concept rendering (2014)
- Developer: Christoph Kohstall, Jelena Jovanovic, Michael Niedermayr
- Type: Wearable camera drone
- Released: Unknown
- Introductory price: "Slightly higher than GoPro" (expected)
- CPU: Intel Edison chip
- Graphics: 1080p HD images and video
- Weight: < 45 g (0.1 lb)
- Website: www.flynixie.com

Nixie was a prototype small camera-equipped drone that can be worn as a wrist band. Nixie can be activated to unfold into a quadcopter, fly in one of its pre-programmed modes to take photos or a video, and then return to the user. Competing against more than 500 other participants, Nixie's developers became the winning team in the development track of the Intel's Make It Wearable competition on November 3, 2014, thus securing $500,000 in seed funding to develop Nixie into a product. The developers stated their goal to develop the drone into the next generation of point-and-shoot cameras.

As of March 2016, the device was in development and was not commercially available. On December 26, 2017, Nixie Labs, the drone's maker, stopped doing business and surrendered its corporate registration in the State of California.

== Features ==
Nixie is a drone that unfolds into a quadcopter and is worn as a slap bracelet. It weighs < 45 g (0.1 lb), captures full HD images or video, and syncs with a smartphone. The drone uses an Intel Edison chip. In October 2014, Nixie prototypes had good functionality, but lacked durability and design perfection. At that time, an important engineering challenge was to identify flexible, light, and durable materials to achieve the look of concept renderings. In November 2014, an updated prototype added image recognition capabilities to identify the user, and the primary goals were improving propellers, motors, and object navigation. The overall goal for the project was stated as building a light, portable, and user-friendly drone that could serve as a "personal photographer". Accordingly, the drone was named after a playful water spirit Nixie of Germanic mythology. In the media, Nixie has been described as a "wearable selfie drone" and as a "wearable camera drone", with such images being nicknamed "dronies". The developers emphasized that Nixie is intended for taking framing-worthy pictures and videos, not only selfies.

== Applications ==
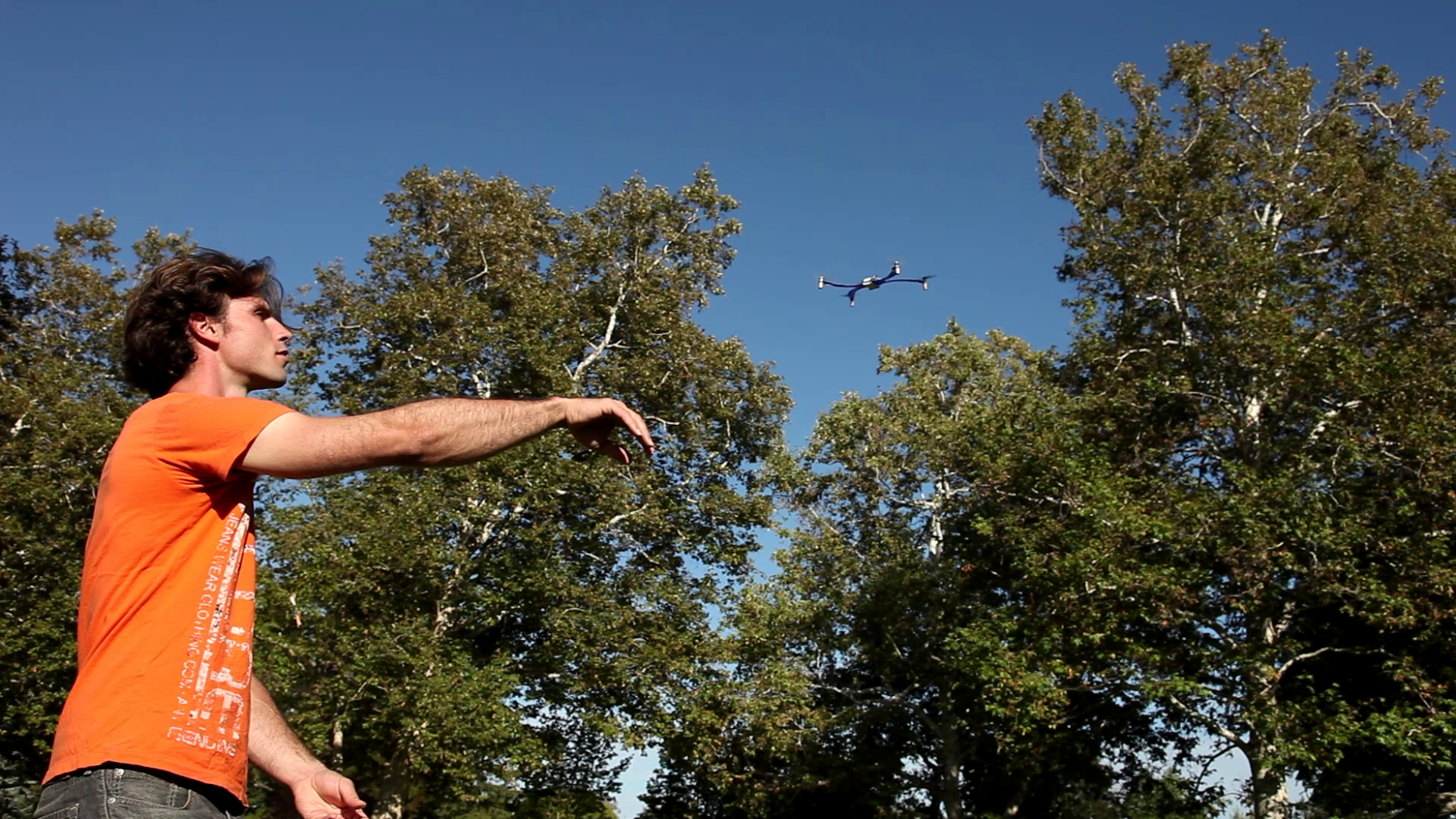
Prototype of the drone flown by Christoph Kohstall (2014)

Even though a wearable camera drone was suggested to have applications in rock climbing, mountain biking, and other adventure sports, in November 2014 the developers announced plans to market Nixie to a niche audience of rock climbers first, before expanding to a general audience.

== Operation modes ==
Sensors and motion-prediction algorithms are used to guide Nixie along one of four pre-programmed paths for taking photos or video.

- In a boomerang mode, the drone flies a set distance from its user, takes a photo, and then returns.
- In a panorama mode, it takes photos to fill a 360° arc.
- In a follow me mode, it serves as a third-person view camera by trailing the user.
- In a hover mode, it hovers for use in jib shots and can be controlled from a smartphone.

== History ==
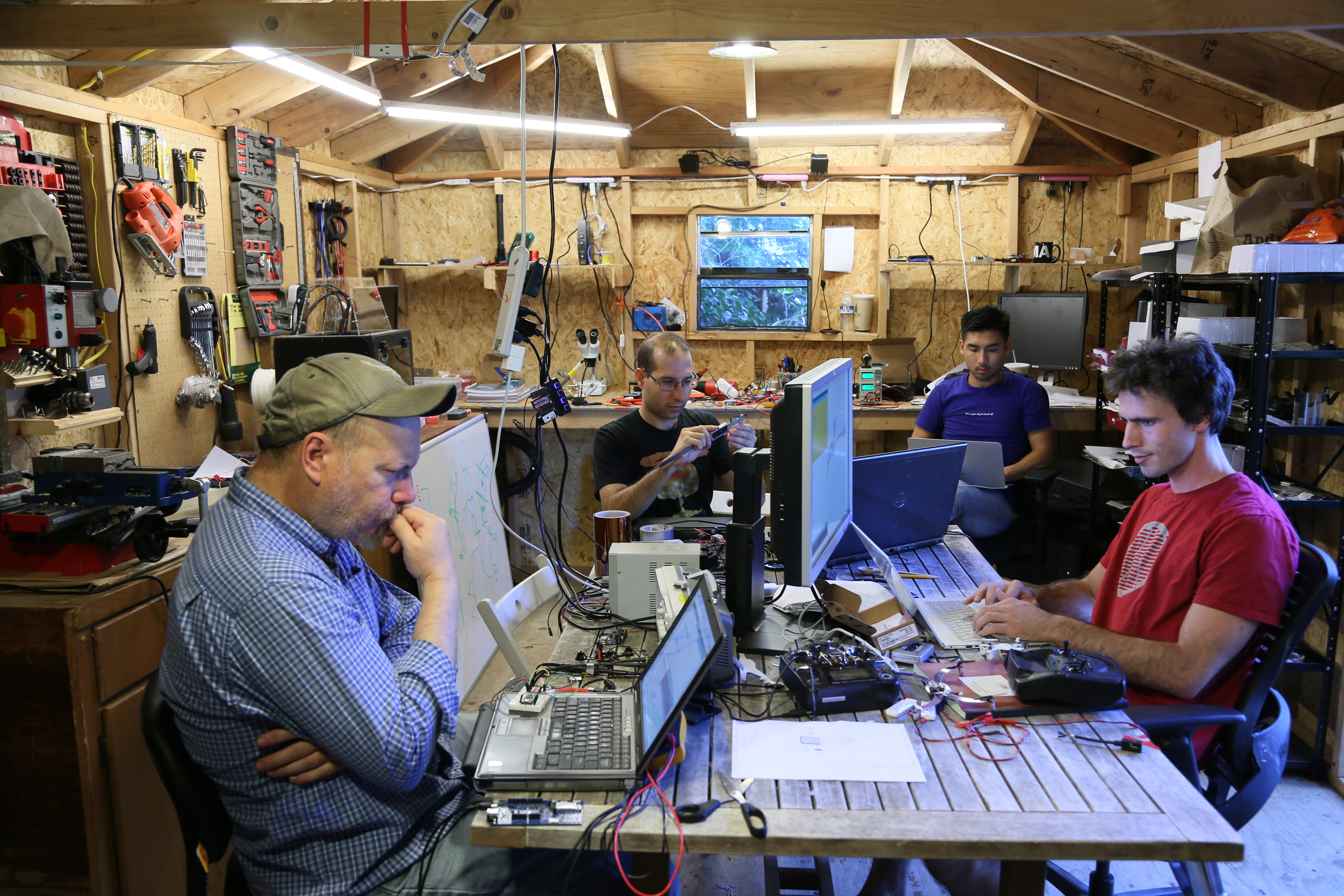
Nixie prototyping workshop (2014)

According to Wired, the first Nixie prototype was built by Christoph Kohstall. After tinkering with a quadcopter that he received as a gift, Kohstall built a drone model of eyeglasses with propellers, as well as a prototype that could dive underwater and then reemerge from under the surface. To better address the poor usability of quadcopters, he then had an idea to create a "flying wristband" with a camera. Kohstall's partner Jelena Jovanovic was involved in creating the first prototype and later became the project manager. Together with Michael Niedermayr, Kohstall and Jovanovic entered the 2014 Intel's Make It Wearable competition as team Nixie led by Kohstall. Once the team became a finalist on September 3, 2014, Nixie received significant amount of attention, and > 5.9 million views on YouTube. As one of ten competition finalists, the team was provided with mentorship, design assistance, technical support, and $50,000 for further development. The team presented the final prototype at the Intel Make It Wearable Challenge Finale on November 3, 2014, winning the $500,000 seed funding grand prize to develop the prototype into a product. In their second interview with Wired, the developers indicated that their primary goals for improving the drone were optimizing propellers, motors, and object navigation, as well as miniaturisation of Nixie.

== Developers ==
- Christoph Kohstall holds a PhD in particle physics from IQOQI, and is currently a postdoctoral fellow at Stanford University. Kohstall serves as a co-founder and Chief executive officer of Nixie.
- Jelena Jovanovic is a technical program manager at Google. Jovanovic is Chief operating officer of Nixie.
- Michael Niedermayr, Floris Ernst, Stefan Niedermayr, Steven Le, Kris Winer, Jeremy Swerdlow, and Steven Shiozaki have backgrounds in motion prediction algorithms, design, and engineering.

== See also ==
- Unmanned aerial vehicle
- Multirotor
- Quadcopter
- GoPro
- Point-and-shoot camera
