= Hubsan X4 =

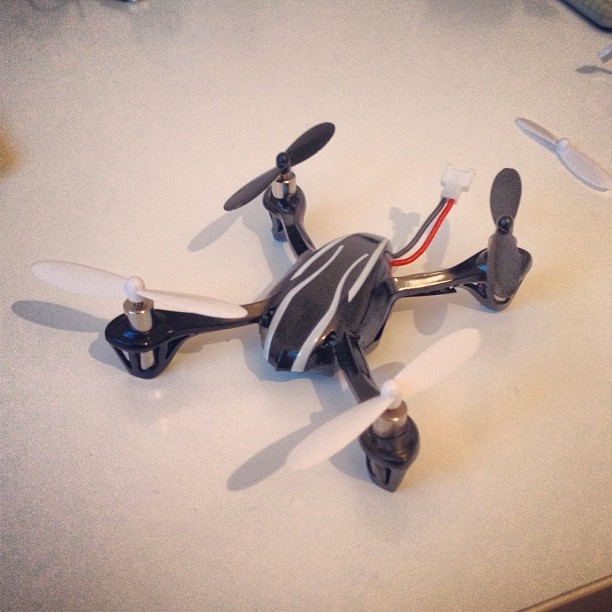
Hubsan X4

The Hubsan X4 is a series of very small, lightweight, remotely controlled quadcopters (sometimes considered unmanned aerial vehicles or "drones") which utilize four propellers (hence the "X4" designation) powered by a single lithium-polymer battery. Since the marketing of the first model, several upgrades and improvements have taken place, each with a subsequent model number and designation attached.

== H107 ==
The H107 was the first model. All subsequent models are based on this basic design. Like all Hubsan X4s, the H107 operates with four propellers and a lithium-polymer battery. It was very inexpensive compared to the available set of other quadcopters, making it appealing to first-time hobbyists and therefore a very popular product. However, it had no built-in LED lights, no camera, was easily damaged when crashing, and could easily blow away in light winds.

== H107L and H107P ==
The H107L was the next Hubsan X4 model. It included a set of four LEDs on the ends of its four arms (hence the "L" designation), allowing the operator to determine its facing direction even in daylight settings. It also was given shorter blade axles on its propellers to help stabilize flight. It was eventually re-designated H107P (for "plus", though not with the same meaning as the plus symbol, "+", about which see below).

== H107C ==
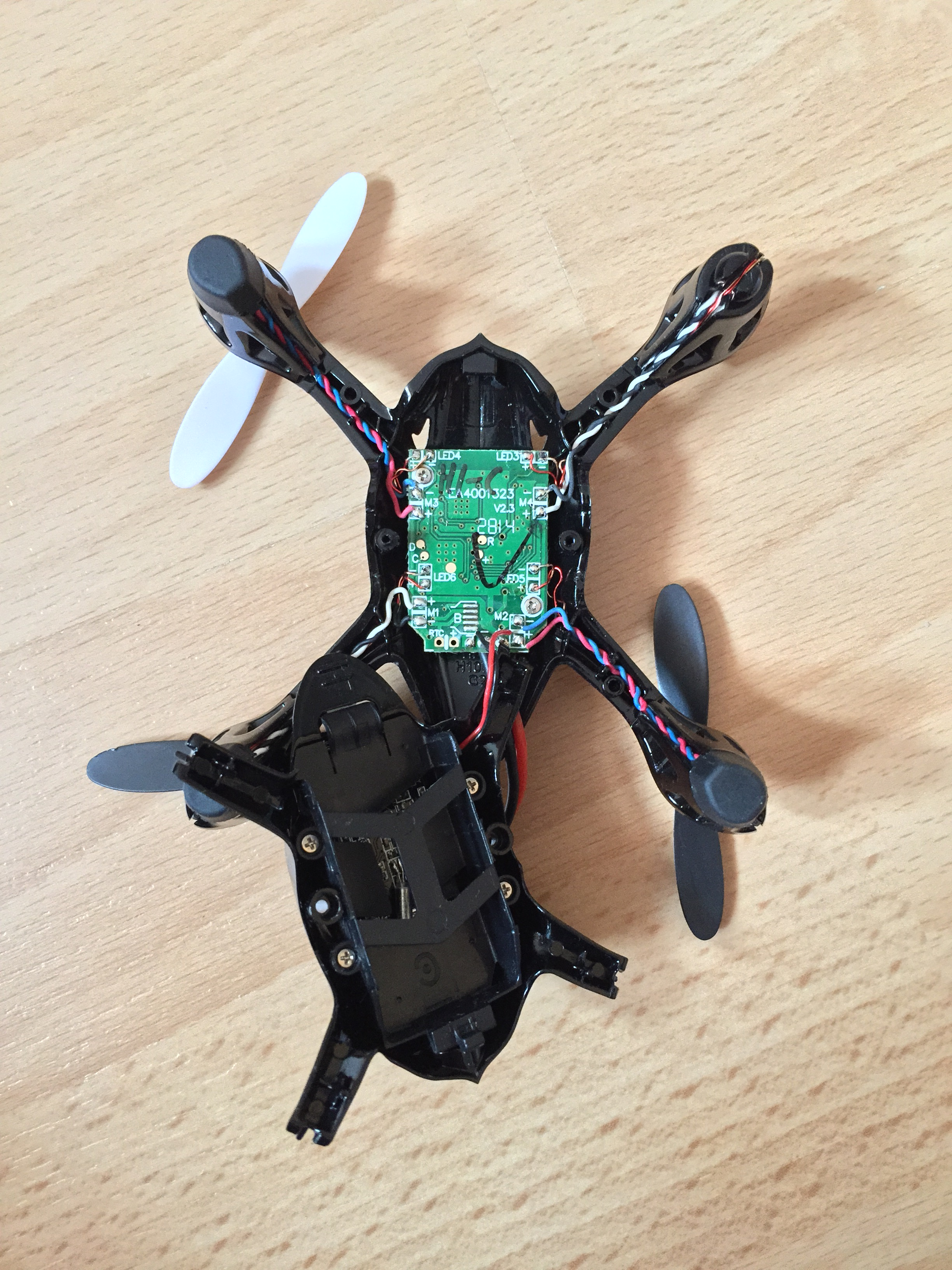
Disassembled H107C

The H107C included a 720p digital on-board camera, allowing the user to record flights onto a micro SD card and then download the recordings to a computer for viewing. The plus model, H107C+, while still being equipped with the same 720P camera as its predecessor, was given an altitude hold mode, allowing it to maintain a given altitude without further input from the controller. The plus version also included screws along the undersides of the arms to prevent the arms from popping open which was a frequent problem in previous models. Upon its release, it was recognized as the smallest publicly available "drone" to contain a camera.

== H107D ==
The H107D was the first Hubsan to have a first person view. It retained the same 720P quality as the H107C, but broadcast it to a video screen on the controller so that the pilot of the craft could see what the craft was "seeing" in real-time. During the 2015 CES Show, the Hubsan X4 H107D Plus (+) was unveiled to the public as the next generation of Hubsan's flagship line. The H107D+ also had the altitude mode upgrade.

== H109 ==
The H109 included a set of brushless DC electric motors with a larger transmitter to harness the resulting power. It also has a 20-minute flight time, which is nearly three times longer than most of the previous models. It did not come in a "plus" variety (there is no H109+) which meant that it lacked the altitude hold function.

== H109S ==
The Hubsan X4 Pro H109S, is the Pro version of drone from Hubsan. It featured a 1080P HD camera, GPS with return-to-home function, altitude stabilization, and internal compass. The GPS and compass work to keep the drone stable and able to fly in less than perfect conditions.

The H109S Pro comes in 3 versions.

- Standard edition or Low Edition, which comes with all of the above features as well as a parachute. This version has only a 1 axis Gimbal allowing it to tilt the camera down only.
- The second version is the same except for an upgraded transmitter.
- The third version is the top end or High Edition. It comes with the Hubsan H7000 Smart Transmitter which has a 7-inch 1200x800 screen and is powered by android. The camera gimbal is also upgraded to 3 axis from 1 meaning that it can control pitch, roll and yaw instead of just pitch.

== H111 ==
The H111, also marketed as the "Q4 Nano" quadcopter, is the smallest quadcopter Hubsan manufactures: it is about 45 mm on a side (excluding propellers), and weighs 11.5 grams. Marketed as more of a toy than other models, it includes few of the features of other Hubsan quadcopters: although it does have the LED lights for orientation, there is no camera, no altitude hold, and it has only a five-minute flight time per charge (battery is built-in and must be charged with a USB cable for 40 minutes to obtain a full charge). Also, unlike most other Hubsan models, the H111 has no pre-designed propeller guard, which means the propellers are more exposed and likely to be damaged in a crash.

== H111 Q4 FPV ==
The Hubsan H111 Q4 FPV follows the pattern that Hubsan use with their other ranges and adds a First Person View capable model to this nano quad. The H111 FPV is the same as the standard H111 in terms of features but it has a FPV camera on the front and a 5.8 GHz video transmitter to send the real time images back to the screen on the controller (transmitter). The battery is a 180 mAh LiPo which, while tiny, is almost twice the size of the standard H111's 100 mAh battery. That results in a slightly increased flight time, even considering the bigger power drain.

== H501S ==
The H501S, also marketed as the "Hubsan X4 FPV brushless" quadcopter, has 20 minutes' flight time, first-person view (FPV), altitude hold, Headless mode, GPS mode, follow-me mode, circle mode, orbit mode, and auto return home.

== H502E ==
The H502E, also marketed as the "H502E X4 DESIRE CAM" is a smaller version of the H501S quadcopter. Uses brushed motors, has 12 minutes' flight time, 7.4V (2S) 610 mAh Li-Po battery, GPS Positioning, altitude hold, 720P High Definition Camera and return to home. Includes the standard TX H907A remote, extra props, USB charger and a tiny screwdriver. Same unit as the Revell PULSE #23887

== H502S ==
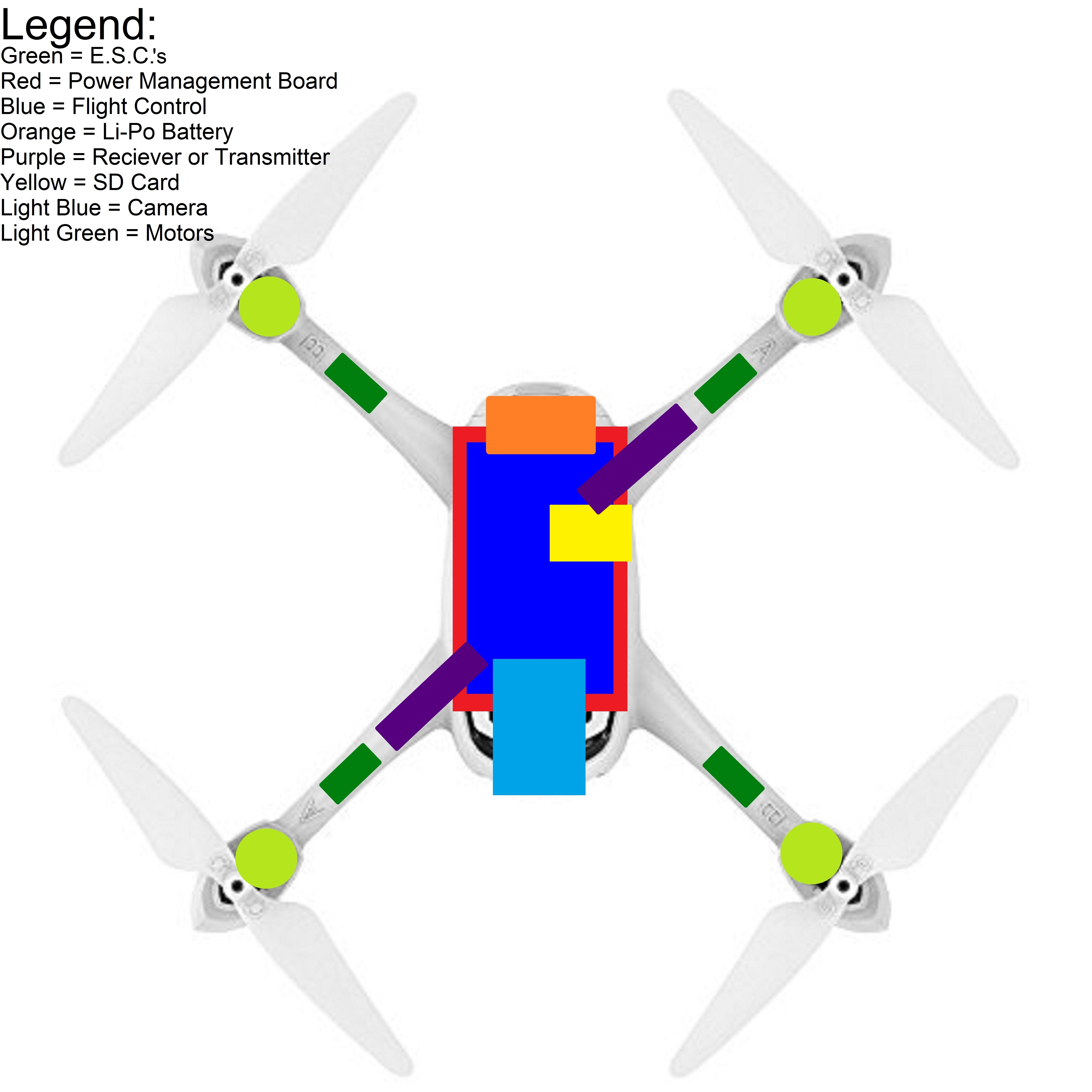
Internal component diagram of an H502S Desire

The H502S, also marketed as the "H502S X4 DESIRE FPV" is a smaller version of the H501S quadcopter and same size as the H502E. Uses brushed motors, has 12 minutes' flight time, 7.4 V (2S) 610 mAh Li-Po battery, GPS Positioning, first-person view (FPV), altitude hold, follow-me mode, 720P High Definition Camera and return to home. Includes the standard H901A remote, USB charger, extra props and a tiny screwdriver. Same unit as the Revell PULSE FPV #23875

== H501A ==
The H501A, also known as the 'X4 Air Pro' has a flight time of 20 minutes, it uses a battery 7.4 V 2700 mAh Li-Po and has a charging time of 210 minutes. Total fly distance 300 meters. APP compatible/orbiting/functional waypoints. FPV: Real Time Photo/Video Transmission. 4 Brushless Motors. HD camera resolution 1920 x 1080P. Flight Control Failsafe and Low Power Failsafe. GPS/Follow Me/Headless/RTH/Automatic Take-Off.

== H507A ==
The H507A, also known as the X4 Star Pro, is APP compatible and let you set the waypoints on the map to photography easier. It has a 720P High Definition Camera. GPS Accurate Position. Automatic Return To Home. Flight Time 10 Minutes. Battery- 7.6V 550mAh Li-Po. Charging Time- 200 minutes. Distance- 300 meters(with Relay). APP Compatible/Orbiting/Functional Waypoints. Real time FPV/Photo/Video. 4 Coreless Motors. Flight Control Failsafe/Low Power Failsafe. GPS/Follow Me/Headless/RTH/Automatic Take-Off.
