= Bitcraze Crazyflie 2.0 =

Crazyflie 2.0
- Developer: Bitcraze
- Manufacturer: Bitcraze
- Type: Quadcopter
- Generation: 2nd
- Released: December 2014; 11 years ago
- Website: Bitcraze

The Crazyflie 2.0 is a lightweight, open source flying development platform based on a nano quadcopter.

== History ==
Crazyflie 2.0 is the second iteration of the open source Crazyflie nano quadcopter released in 2013 by Marcus Eliasson, Arnaud Taffanel, and Tobias Antonsson. The Crazyflie platform specifications are open source and available to anyone through the Bitcraze wiki and the Bitcraze GitHub repo

== Features ==
The Crazyflie 2.0 is a palm sized quadcopter weighing 27 grams supporting wireless control over radio and Bluetooth Low Energy (LE). It has a flight time of 7 minutes and a charge time of 40. As an open source project, its code and design specifications are available to anyone and the design was created with modification in mind. It's extensible with additional boards called "decks" - similar to Arduino shields - that are connected through two rows of pin headers.

== Decks ==
The following decks are currently available:

- LED-ring deck
- Qi wireless charging deck
- SD-card deck
- Prototyping deck
- BigQuad deck
- Breakout deck
- Buzzer deck
- Loco positioning deck
- Z-ranger deck
- Flow deck

== Development ==
The Crazyflie firmware is written in C and based on FreeRTOS. On the client side several languages can be used including Python, C++, C#, Ruby, NodeJS, Scala, Java and Ada/SPARK. There are also mobile clients for iOS and Android available.

== See also ==
- UAV
- Quadcopter
