= Skydio R1 =

American camera drone

General information
- Type: Camera drone
- National origin: United States
- Manufacturer: Skydio

History
- Manufactured: 2018–c. 2019
- Introduction date: February 2018

The Skydio R1 is an American teleoperated quadcopter drone produced by Skydio. Introduced in 2018, the R1 was produced in limited numbers as a proof of concept for the company's later drones.

== Design and development ==
Announced in February 2018, the R1 was the first drone released by Skydio. The drone is capable of flying autonomously using only its 12 navigation cameras. The R1 also has a gimbal-stabilized 4K main camera and can be controlled with a mobile app rather than a controller. The drone's structure is made of carbon-fiber and aluminum, allowing it be stowed in a backpack without being damage. The drone has a maximum flight time of 16 minutes, which The Verge noted was lower than contemporary DJI drones. The R1 is powered by a 256-core NVIDIA Jetson TX1, which is mounted in the middle of the drone and allows it to recognize humans and other objects. The drone was initially released in a limited "Frontier Edition", which were built at Skydio's corporate headquarters before mass production began.

While the R1 was praised for its autonomous capabilities, the drone was significantly more expensive than the competing DJI Mavic Pro. Engadget noted that the R1 was almost as expensive as the high-end DJI Inspire 2. The R1 was still listed on Skydio's website as late as July 2019. After the launch of the R1's successor, the Skydio 2, Skydio co-founder Adam Bry referred to the R1 as "the Tesla Roadster of autonomous drones", comparing the drone to the car produced in limited numbers by Tesla Motors as a proof of concept for its future vehicles.

== Specifications (Skydio R1) ==
Data from

General characteristics

- Length: 1 ft 1 in (0.33 m)
- Width: 1 ft 4 in (0.41 m)
- Height: 1.6 in (0.04 m)
- Empty weight: 2.2 lb (1 kg)

Performance

- Maximum speed: 25 mph (40 km/h, 22 kn)
- Endurance: 16 minutes
- Service ceiling: 60 ft (18.29 m)
- WiFi range: 300 ft (91.44 m)

== See also ==
- History of unmanned aerial vehicles

Aircraft of comparable role, configuration, and era

- DJI Air
- DJI Mavic

Related lists

- List of unmanned aerial vehicles
