= DJI Mavic =

Series of teleoperated compact quadcopter drone models

Mavic 御
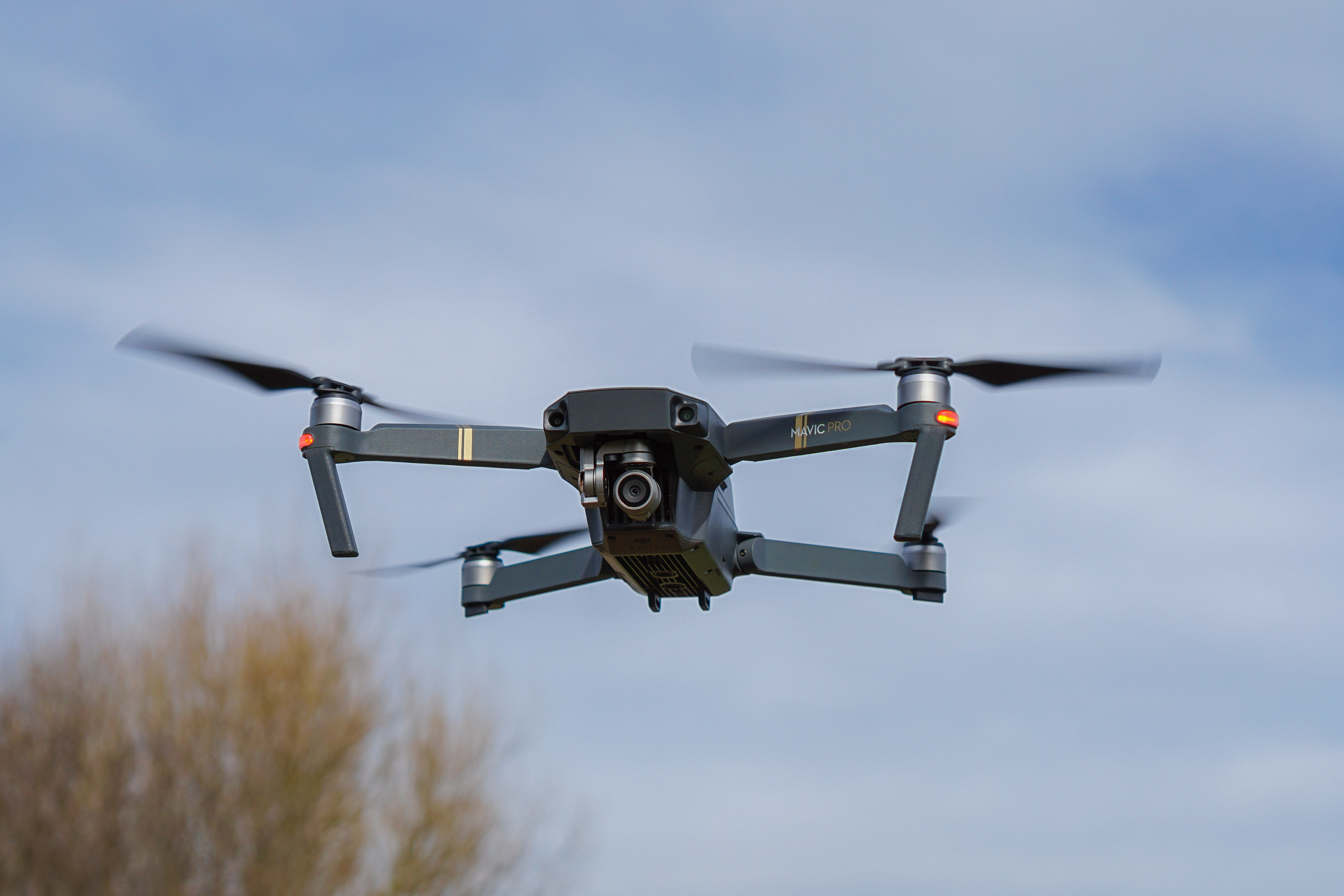
- DJI Mavic Pro, the series' first entry

General information
- Type: Unmanned aerial vehicle
- National origin: China
- Manufacturer: DJI; Anzu Robotics
- Designer: Yumian Deng
- Status: In production

History
- Manufactured: 2016–present
- Introduction date: September 2016
- Developed into: DJI Air; DJI Mini

The DJI Mavic (Chinese: 御; pinyin: Yù) is a series of teleoperated compact quadcopter drones for personal and commercial aerial photography and videography use, released by the Chinese technology company DJI. Released in 2016, the Mavic introduced a foldable chassis to replace the rigid, bulky quadcopter design of the DJI Phantom.

== Design and development ==
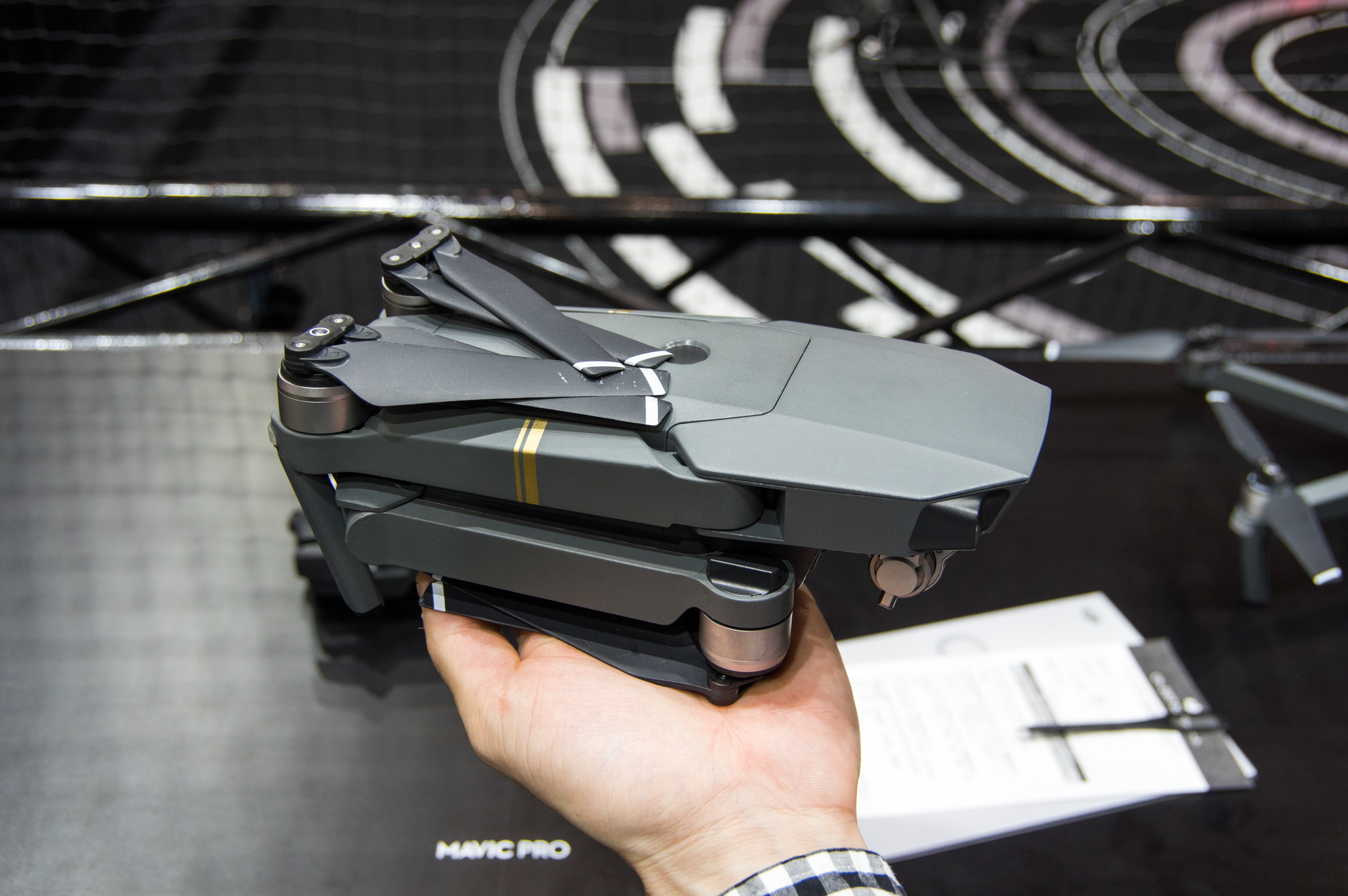
The Mavic Pro in its folded state

The first of the Mavic series, the Mavic Pro, was announced in September 2016. The Mavic Pro design team was led by Yumian Deng, and the drone had undergone numerous design changes prior to its release. Unlike its predecessor, the DJI Phantom, the Mavic Pro was designed for portability with a lightweight and foldable design. The original Mavic Pro is equipped with the same 12-megapixel camera as the Phantom 4, which is capable of capturing 4K video at 24 frames per second (FPS) or 1080p video at 96 FPS, and has the same bitrate as the Phantom at 60 Mbit/s. Unlike the Phantom 4, which has a 94-degree field of view (FOV), the Mavic Pro has an FOV of only 78 degrees. The Mavic Pro introduced the OcuSync 1.0 transmission system capable of livestreaming video in 1080p up to a distance of 7 kilometers (4.3 miles) and 720p beyond. The drone has a top speed is 65 km/h (40 mph) in sport mode, a range of 4.3 miles (6.9 km), and is powered by a 3830 mAh battery giving it a flight time of 27 minutes.

An improved model known as the Mavic Pro Platinum was announced at the August 2017 IFA trade show. The Platinum had an improved battery which increased flight time to 30 minutes. The drone was also fitted with new Model 8331 propellers and improved electronic speed controllers which reduced noise by 4 dB.

=== Mavic 2 series ===
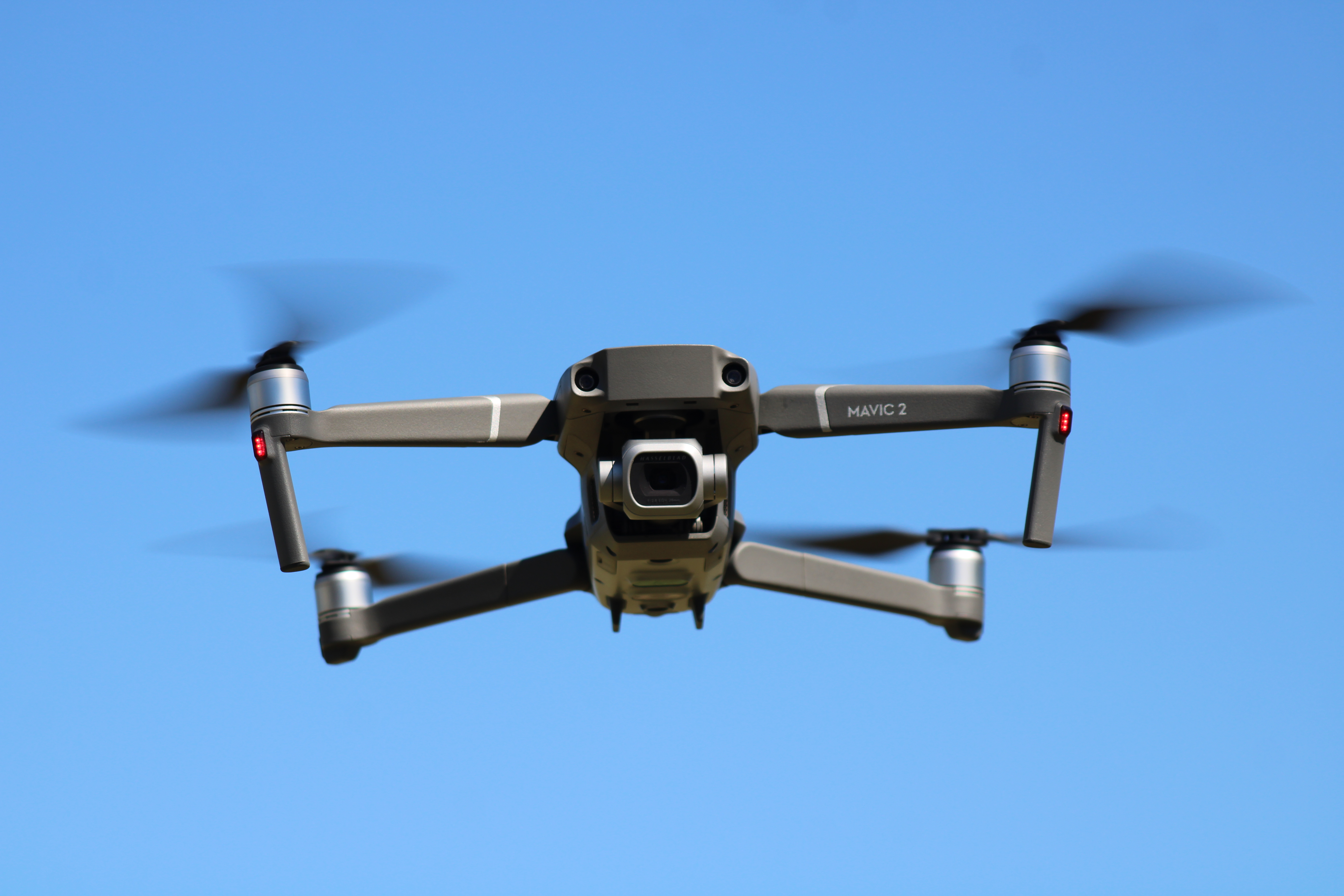
Mavic 2 Pro in flight

DJI announced the Mavic 2 Pro and the Mavic 2 Zoom in August 2018. Compared to its predecessor, the Mavic 2 series features a refined design with strengthened arms and a more streamlined body. The Mavic 2 features 10 obstacle avoidance sensors on all sides. Battery capacity was increased to 3850 mAh, giving the drone a maximum flight time of 31 minutes. The Mavic 2 also introduced the OcuSync 2.0 transmission system capable of livestreaming video in 1080p at all distances. The Mavic 2 Pro and Zoom models differ primarily in the camera installed. The Mavic 2 Zoom has a 12MP camera 4× zoom feature (2× optical and 2× digital), while the Pro is fitted with a 20MP Hasselblad camera with a "hyperlapse" feature. Both cameras are capable of recording 4K video at 30 FPS and have 8GB of internal storage.

On 29 October 2018, DJI announced the Mavic 2 Enterprise. The Enterprise differs from the baseline Mavic 2 series in that it can be fitted with modular accessories for both first responder and industrial applications. Three such modules were made available at launch; the Spotlight, Speaker, and Beacon for making drones visible at night. The Enterprise also features a camera with 6× zoom, increased internal storage of 24GB, and self-heating batteries for flying in cold environments.

The Mavic 2 Enterprise Dual was announced in December 2018, differing from the Enterprise in that it incorporates a thermal camera from FLIR Systems in addition to the visual camera.

The Mavic 2 Enterprise Advanced was introduced in April 2021 with an improved thermal camera sensor, upgraded 48MP 1/2 in (13 mm) camera sensor, and support for optional real-time kinematic (RTK) module.

=== Mavic 3 series ===
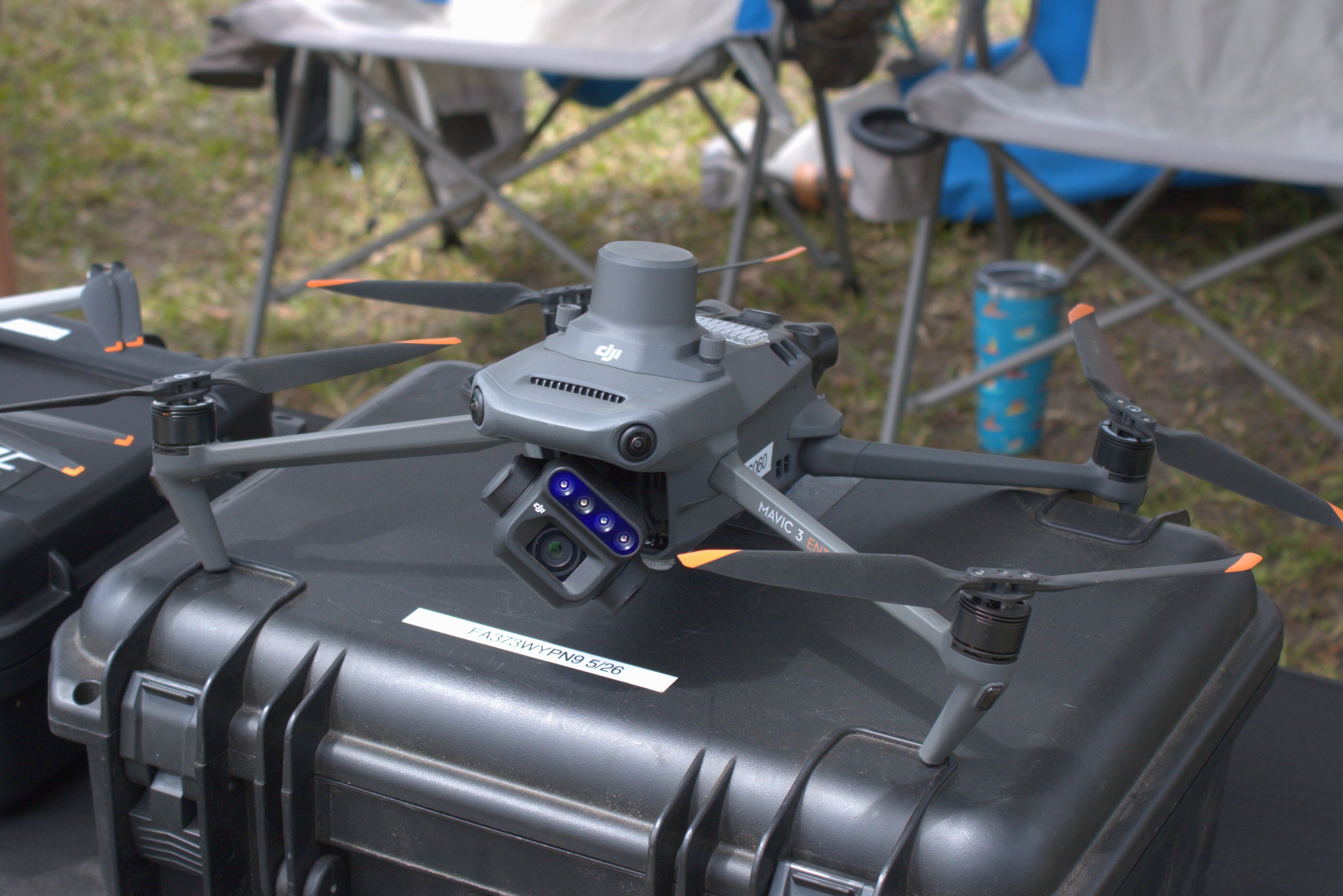
Mavic 3M Multispectral with RTK module and multispectral camera system

In November 2021 DJI announced the Mavic 3 and Mavic 3 Cine. The Mavic 3 series introduced a 5000 mAh battery, increasing flight time to 46 minutes. Unlike previous models, the Mavic 3 has both a wide-angle and telephoto camera in the gimbal. The wide-angle camera is a 20MP 4/3" CMOS Hasselblad L2D-20c camera with a 24 mm focal length. The 12MP 1/2" CMOS telephoto camera has a 162 mm lens with 28× zoom. The camera has 12.8 stops of dynamic range and shoots up to 5.1k video. Mavic 3 has a 4G accessory which is attached to the drone using a USB-C connection and which is then used to control the drone over a 4G mobile network. The OcuSync 2.0 transmission system of the Mavic 2 was upgraded to the O3+ on the Mavic 3, which increased the maximum control range to 15 km (9.3 mi). The Mavic 3 also introduced the improved ActiveTrack 5.0 obstacle avoidance system, an internal Remote ID system, and a positioning algorithm which takes signals from GPS, GLONASS, and BeiDou satellites. The Cine differs from the baseline Mavic 3 in that it is able to capture ProRes 422 HQ at a maximum rate of 3772 Mbit/s and has an internal 1TB SSD.

On 27 September 2022, DJI released the Enterprise series of DJI Mavic 3, which has either a thermal camera (Mavic 3T Thermal) or a camera with a mechanical shutter (Mavic 3E Enterprise). The Enterprise series has an accessory USB-C port for adding an RTK module or speaker. The both models' telephoto camera also have a higher digital zoom for a total of 56× hybrid zoom. The Mavic 3E retains the 20MP 4/3" CMOS Hasselblad wide-angle camera of the Mavic 3, while the Mavic 3T replaces it with a smaller 48MP 1/2" CMOS model not from Hasselblad. The Mavic 3T also has a thermal camera capable of shooting 640 × 512 at 30 FPS. The Enterprise edition uses DJI RC Pro Enterprise controller, which is similar to DJI RC Pro used for the baseline Mavic 3 but includes a microphone. An improved version of the Mavic 3T was quietly released in September 2025 as the Mavic 3T Advanced, differing primarily in its upgraded thermal camera.

On 2 November 2022, DJI released the Mavic 3 Classic as a cheaper alternative to the original Mavic 3. It differs from the baseline Mavic 3 in that it removed the telephoto camera, leaving only the wide-angle camera in the gimbal.

On 23 November 2022, DJI added a new model to the Enterprise line; the Mavic 3M Multispectral. The Mavic 3M includes the RTK module as standard and has a four-lens 5MP multispectral camera system in place of the Mavic 3E's telephoto camera.

On 22 April 2023, DJI released the Mavic 3 Pro and Mavic 3 Pro Cine, replacing the original Mavic 3. The Mavic 3 Pro was the first DJI drone to have three optical cameras, with a medium 48MP 1/1.3" CMOS telephoto camera being added in addition to the original two cameras. Flight time was slightly decreased to 43 minutes. The Pro Cine differs from the Pro in that it supports ProRes 422, ProRes 422 HQ, and ProRes 422 LT encoding and has an internal 1TB SSD.

=== Mavic 4 Pro ===
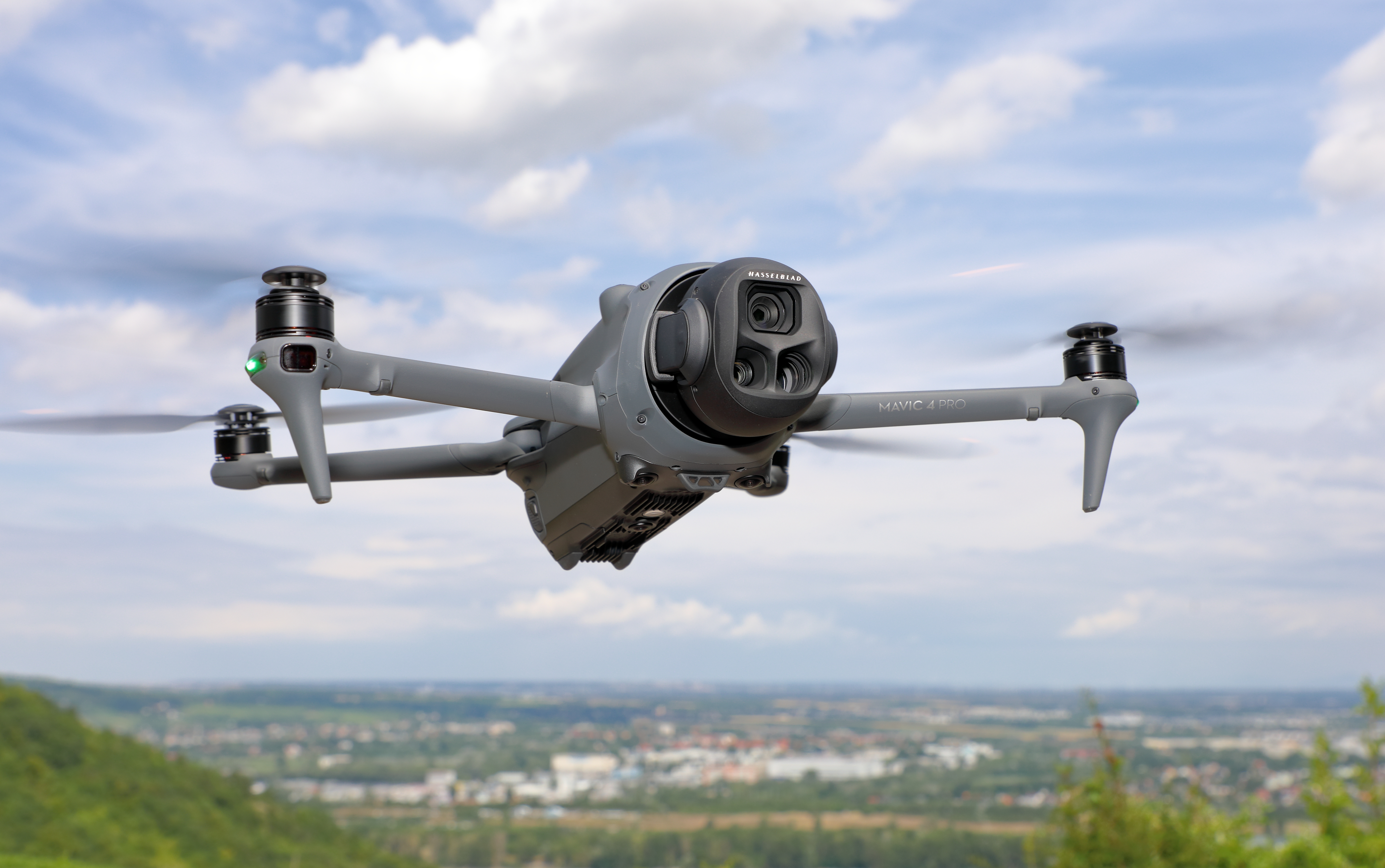
Mavic 4 Pro in flight

In December 2024, leaks surfaced of a Federal Communications Commission filing for the Mavic 4 Pro. Two models were revealed in the filing; the L3A and L3B, which the FCC states are "electrically identical" and "named differently for marketing [purposes]". According to the FCC listing, the Mavic 4 Pro will be powered by a 6654 mAh battery. The Mavic 4 Pro was finally released globally on 13 May 2025, though not in the United States due to its tariffs on China. In addition to the upgraded battery, which gives it a maximum flight time of 51 minutes, the drone also features an updated shell design with the camera gimbal sticking out the front rather than below as on previous models. The new "infinity gimbal" is capable of rotating 360 degrees and mounts three cameras; a 100MP 4/3" CMOS Hasselblad wide-angle camera with a variable aperture capable of shooting 6K video, a 1/1.3" CMOS telephoto camera similar to the one found on the Mini 4 Pro, and a 1/1.5" CMOS medium telephoto camera. Other improvements include an O4+ video transmission system, a more advanced obstacle avoidance system, and a satellite-free Return-to-Home feature.

=== Licensed versions ===
In April 2024, Texas-based company Anzu Robotics introduced licensed versions of the Mavic 3 Enterprise series as the Raptor (based on the Mavic 3E) and Raptor T (based on the Mavic 3T) in an attempt to capitalize off of the potential ban of DJI products in the United States. The two drones are nearly identical to their Chinese counterparts, though they are built in Malaysia, have a distinctive forest green color, and lack geofencing capabilities. The Raptor series is backwards compatible with many DJI Mavic 3 components, including the optional RTK module and batteries.

Despite building its drones in Malaysia and using servers based in Virginia, concerns were raised about Anzu's close relationship with DJI. The New York Times noted that Raptor parts were produced in both China and Malaysia and that the drone's flight app is a modified version of DJI's own app. In August 2024, US representatives John Moolenaar and Raja Krishnamoorthi began an investigation into Anzu Robotics and its relation to DJI. The representatives wrote to Anzu Robotics founder Randall Warnas, requesting answers about Anzu's relationship with DJI and stating that researchers had confirmed that the Raptor T was "essentially a DJI Mavic 3 painted green" and ran on DJI technology. Moolenaar and Krishnamoorthi also noted that Warnas had previously stated that the companies' relationship was intended to circumvent restrictions on DJI products. The representatives also compared Anzu to Cogito Tech, which builds versions of the DJI Air and Mini under a similar licensing agreement with DJI.

The Raptor series was discontinued in February 2026 due to supply chain issues.

== Variants ==
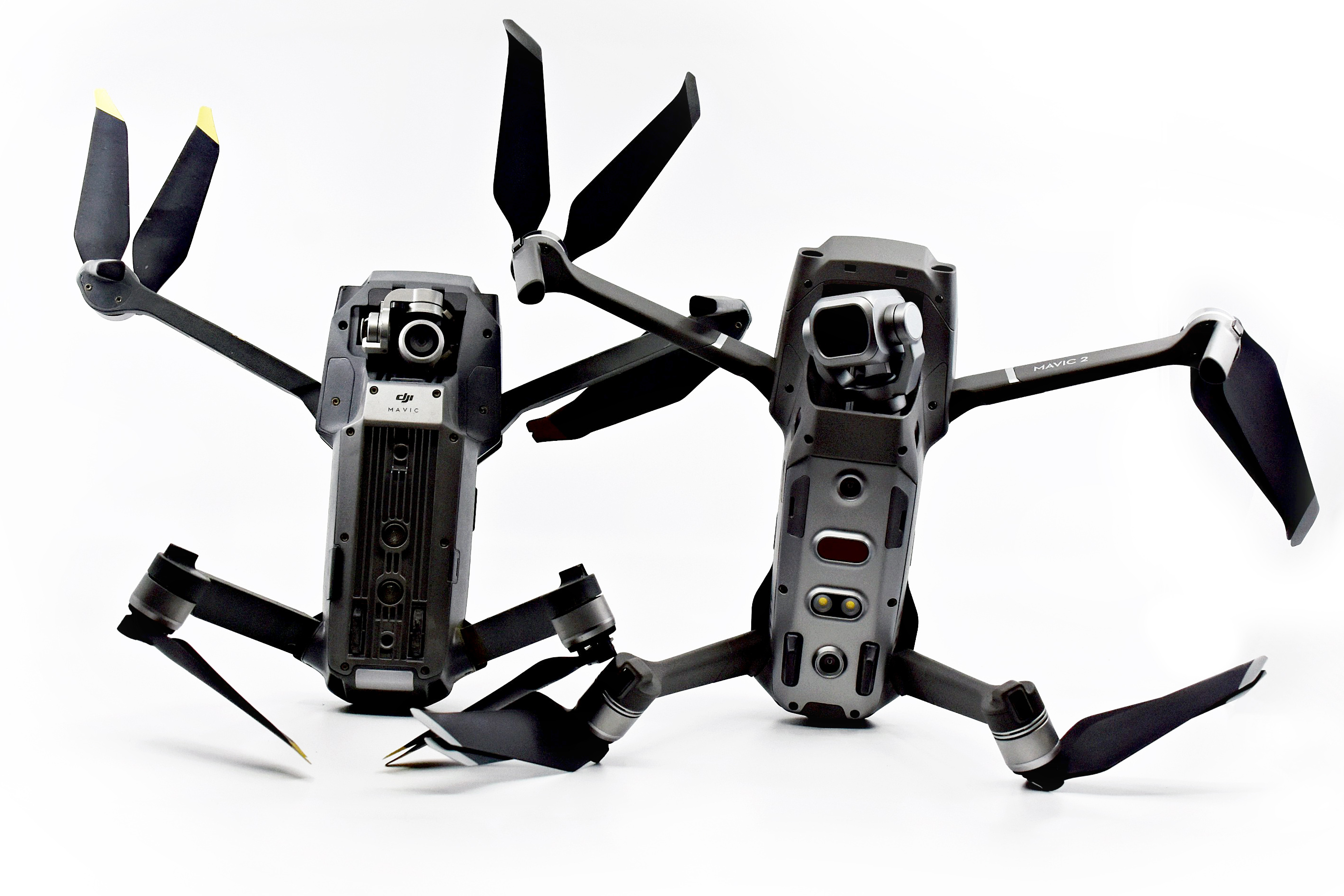
DJI Mavic Pro (left) and Mavic 2 Pro (right)

=== Mavic (1st generation) ===
Mavic Pro
Company designation Model M1P. Original model with a 12MP camera and OcuSync 1.0 transmission system. Powered by a 3830 mAh battery giving it 27 minutes of flight time. Introduced in September 2016. A limited edition Mavic Pro with an all-white color scheme was released in November 2017 as the Mavic Pro Alpine.
Mavic Pro Platinum
Company designation Model M1X. As Mavic Pro but with Model 8331 propellers, improved electronic speed controllers, and flight time increased to 30 minutes. Introduced in August 2017.
Mavic Standard
Company designation Model M1S, also known as simply Mavic. Prototype model revealed in an FCC certification application. The Standard was speculated to be a low-end model of the Pro with reduced camera resolution and without obstacle avoidance or OcuSync. However, according to the user manual submitted to the FCC, the Mavic Standard did have an obstacle avoidance system.

=== Mavic 2 ===
Mavic 2 Pro
Company designation Model L1P. Improved model with a refined shell, 10 obstacle avoidance sensors, a 20MP Hasselblad camera, and OcuSync 2.0 transmission system. Battery capacity was increased to 3850 mAh, giving it 31 minutes of flight time. Introduced in August 2018.
Mavic 2 Zoom
Company designation Model L1Z. As Mavic 2 Pro but with a 12MP camera with 4× zoom. Introduced in August 2018 alongside the Mavic 2 Pro.
Mavic 2 Enterprise
Company designation Model L1ZE. Variant intended for first responder and industrial applications with modular attachments and a camera with 6× zoom. Introduced in October 2018.
Mavic 2 Enterprise Dual
Company designation Model L1DE. As Mavic 2 Enterprise but with a FLIR Systems Lepton 3.5 thermal camera in addition to the visual camera. Introduced in December 2018.
Mavic 2 Enterprise Advanced
Company designation Model L1TE. As Mavic 2 Enterprise Dual but with improved thermal and 48MP visual cameras, and support for a real-time kinematic (RTK) module. Introduced in April 2021.

=== Mavic 3 ===
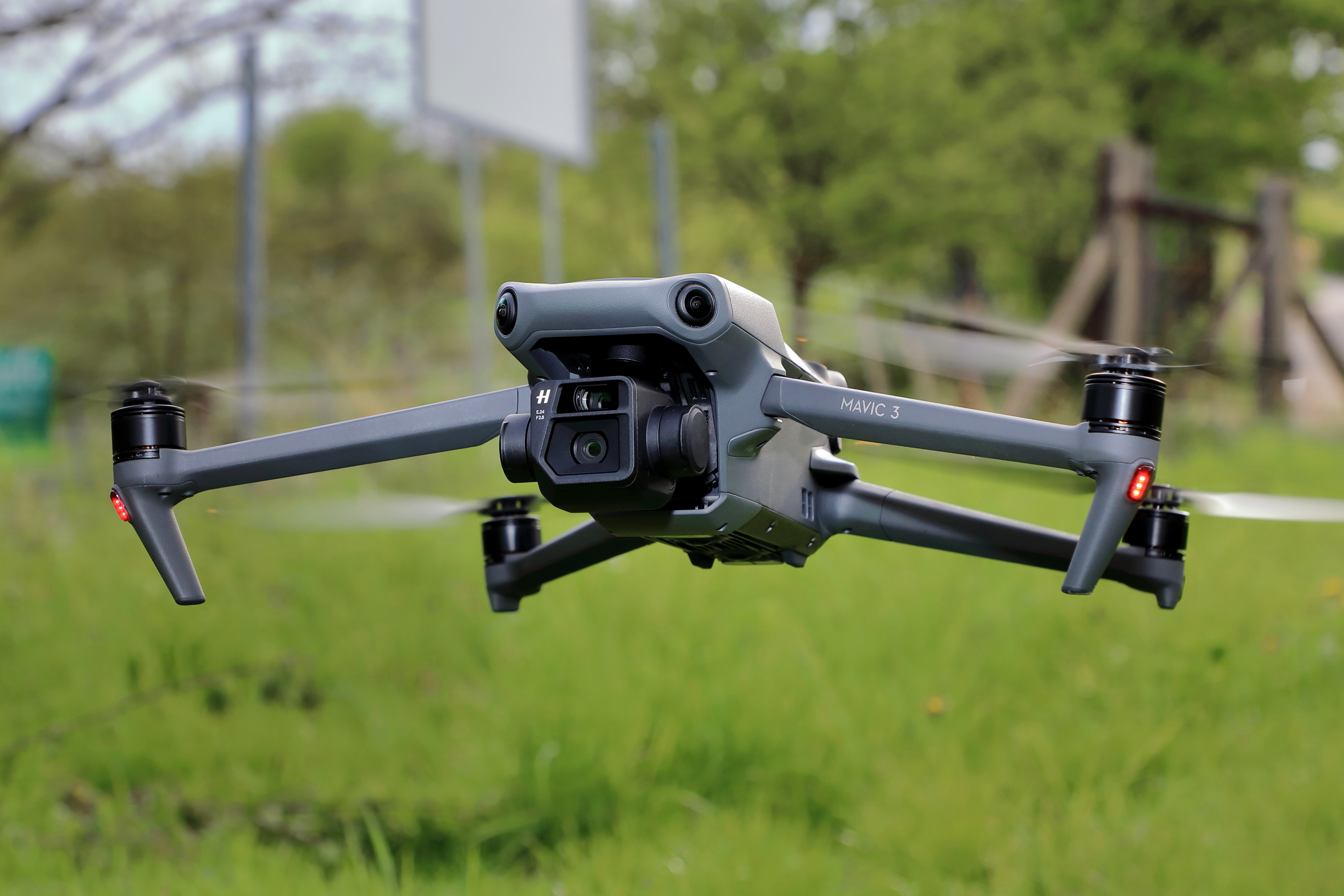
DJI Mavic 3 drone in flight

Mavic 3
Company designation Model L2A. Improved model with a 20MP Hasselblad L2D-20c camera, a 12MP telephoto camera with 28× zoom, and an O3+ transmission system. The Mavic 3 was the first model to have an internal Remote ID system, and also has a positioning algorithm compatible with GPS, GLONASS, and BeiDou satellites. Battery capacity was increased to 5000 mAh, giving it a flight time of 46 minutes. Introduced in November 2021.
Mavic 3 V2.0
Company designation Model L2AA. As Mavic 3 but with a C1 class identification label under the European Union's Unmanned Aircraft Regulation.
Mavic 3 Cine
Company designation Model L2P. As Mavic 3 but with ProRes 422 HQ capability and 1TB SSD. Introduced in November 2021 alongside the Mavic 3.
Mavic 3 Cine V2.0
As Mavic 3 Cine but with a C1 class identification label under the European Union's Unmanned Aircraft Regulation.
Mavic 3 Classic
Company designation Model L2C. As Mavic 3 but with the 12MP telephoto camera removed. Introduced in November 2022.

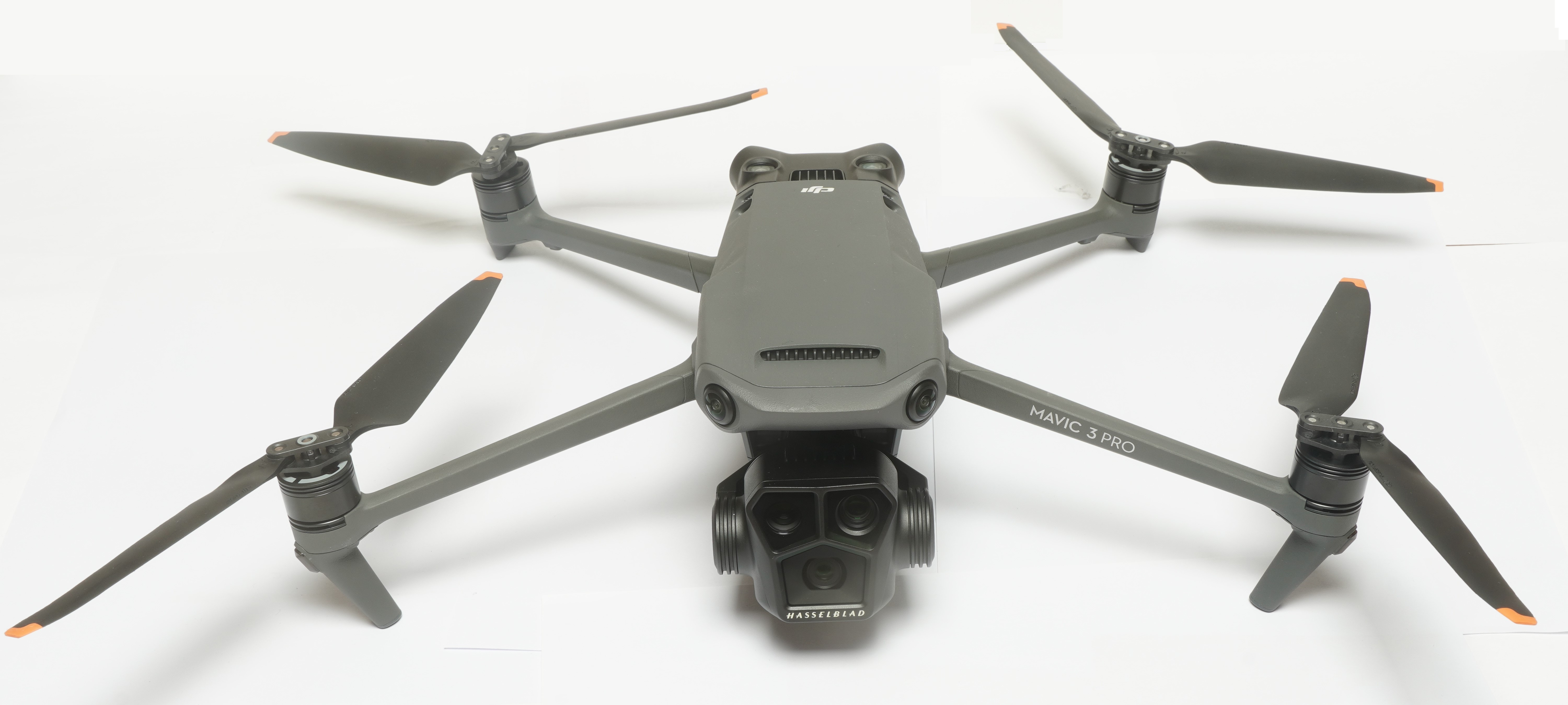
The Mavic 3 Pro was the first DJI drone to mount three optical cameras in a single gimbal.

Mavic 3 Pro
Company designation Model L2S. Improved model with a 48MP telephoto camera in addition to the 20MP and 12MP cameras. Flight time was decreased to 43 minutes. Introduced in April 2023.
Mavic 3 Pro Cine
Company designation Model L2E. As Mavic 3 Pro but with ProRes 422, ProRes 422 HQ, and ProRes 422 LT capability and 1TB SSD. Introduced in April 2023 alongside the Mavic 3 Pro.
Mavic 3E Enterprise
Company designation Model M3E. Variant intended for first responder and industrial applications with support for an optional RTK module and telephoto camera zoom increased to 56×. Introduced in September 2022.
Mavic 3E EU
Company designation Model M3E-EU. Mavic 3E for the European market with two variants, respectively with EASA C1 and C2 certification. The C1 variant is powered by a BWX265-4230-15.4 battery and has a maximum takeoff weight (MTOW) of 899 g (1.982 lb), while the C2 variant is powered by a BWX260-5000-15.4 battery and has an MTOW of 1,050 g (2.31 lb). Both variants use Model 8658F low-noise propellers, which are required for operations under the C2 certification.

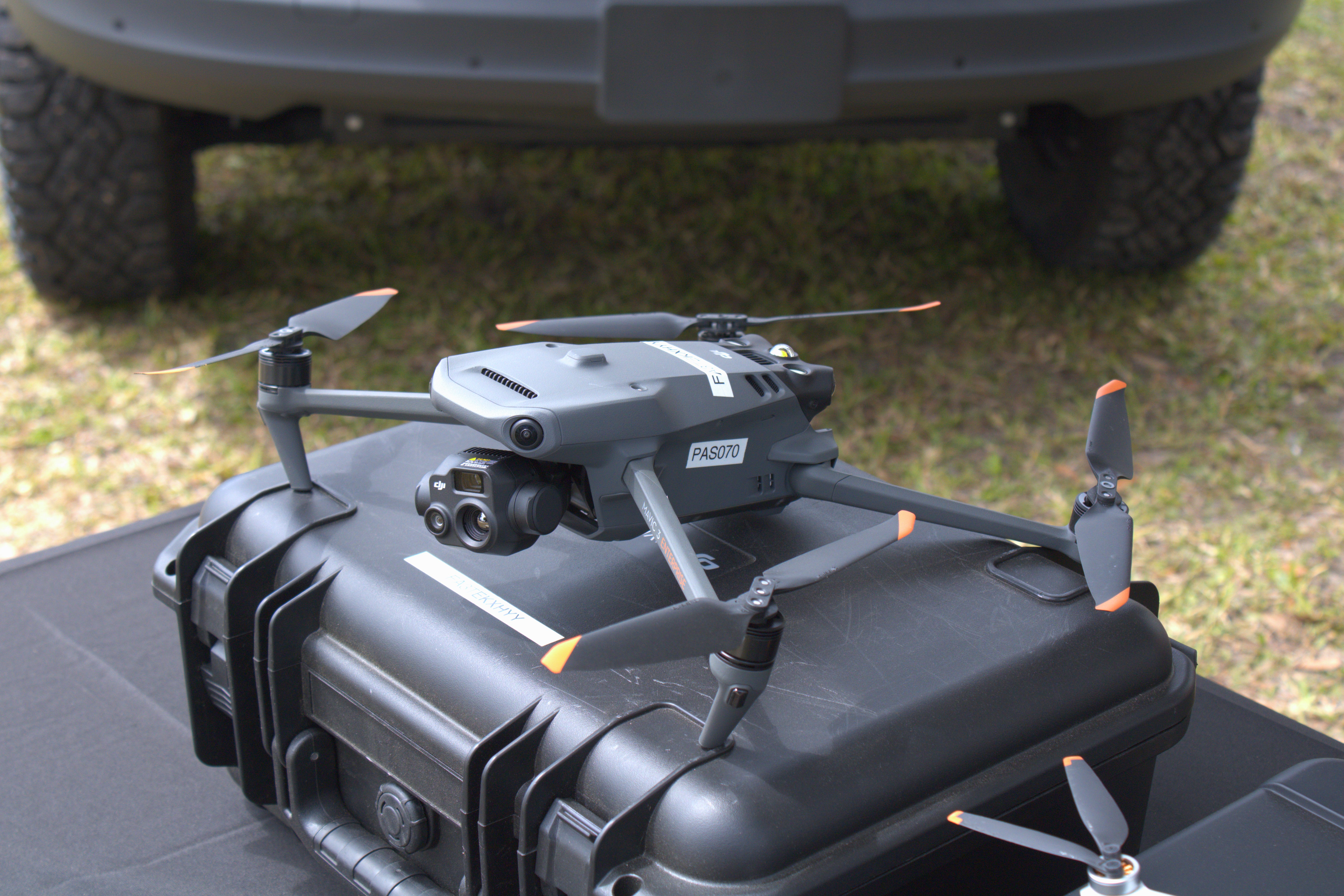
Mavic 3T Thermal

Mavic 3T Thermal
Company designation Model M3T. As Mavic 3E but with a 48MP camera in place of the 20MP Hasselblad unit and a thermal camera. Introduced in September 2022 alongside the Mavic 3E.
Mavic 3T EU
Company designation Model M3T-EU. Mavic 3T for the European market with two variants, respectively with EASA C1 and C2 certification. The C1 variant is powered by a BWX265-4230-15.4 battery and has an MTOW of 899 g (1.982 lb), while the C2 variant is powered by a BWX260-5000-15.4 battery and has an MTOW of 1,050 g (2.31 lb). Both variants use Model 8658F low-noise propellers, which are required for operations under the C2 certification.
Mavic 3T GA
Company designation Model M3T-GA.
Mavic 3T Advanced
Also known as the Mavic 3TA, company designation Model M3TA. As Mavic 3T but with an improved thermal camera with a narrower field of view and smaller pixel pitch, allowing it to detect smaller heat sources at longer ranges. Introduced in September 2025.
Mavic 3T Advanced EU
Company designation Model M3TA-EU. Mavic 3T Advanced for the European market with EASA C1 certification, a BWX265-4230-15.4 battery, an MTOW of 899 g (1.982 lb), and Model 8658F low-noise propellers.
Mavic 3M Multispectral
Company designation Model M3M. Development of the Mavic 3E intended for agriculture applications with a four-lens 5MP multispectral camera in place of the telephoto camera and the RTK module as standard equipment. Introduced in November 2022.
Mavic 3M EU
Company designation Model M3M-EU. Mavic 3M for the European market with EASA C2 certification, a BWX260-5000-15.4 battery, an MTOW of 1,050 g (2.31 lb), and Model 8658F low-noise propellers.
Raptor
Company designation RAPTOR01. License-built Mavic 3E built in Malaysia by Anzu Robotics. The Raptor differs from its Chinese counterpart in its forest green coloring and lack of geofencing.
Raptor T
Company designation RAPTORT01. License-built Mavic 3T built in Malaysia by Anzu Robotics. The Raptor T differs from its Chinese counterpart in its forest green coloring and lack of geofencing.

=== Mavic 4 ===
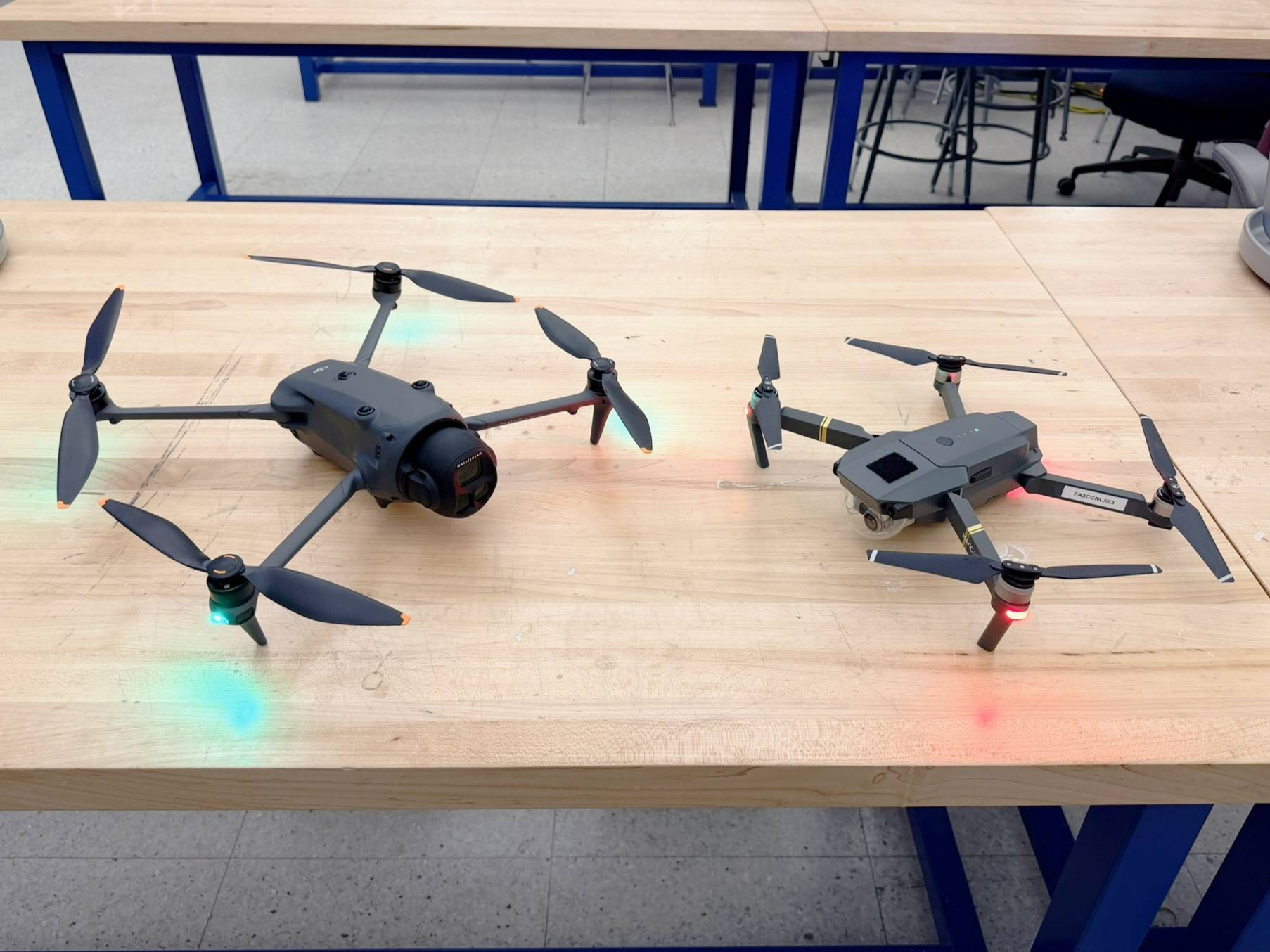
Mavic 4 Pro (left) alongside the original Mavic Pro (right).

Mavic 4 Pro
Company designation Model L3A and L3B. Improved model with a 100MP 4/3" CMOS Hasselblad wide-angle camera, 1/1.5" CMOS medium telephoto camera, 1/1.3" CMOS telephoto camera, O4+ transmission system, satellite-free Return-to-Home, and powered by a 6654 mAh battery giving it a flight time of 51 minutes. The two models are electrically identical. Introduced in May 2025.

== Operators ==
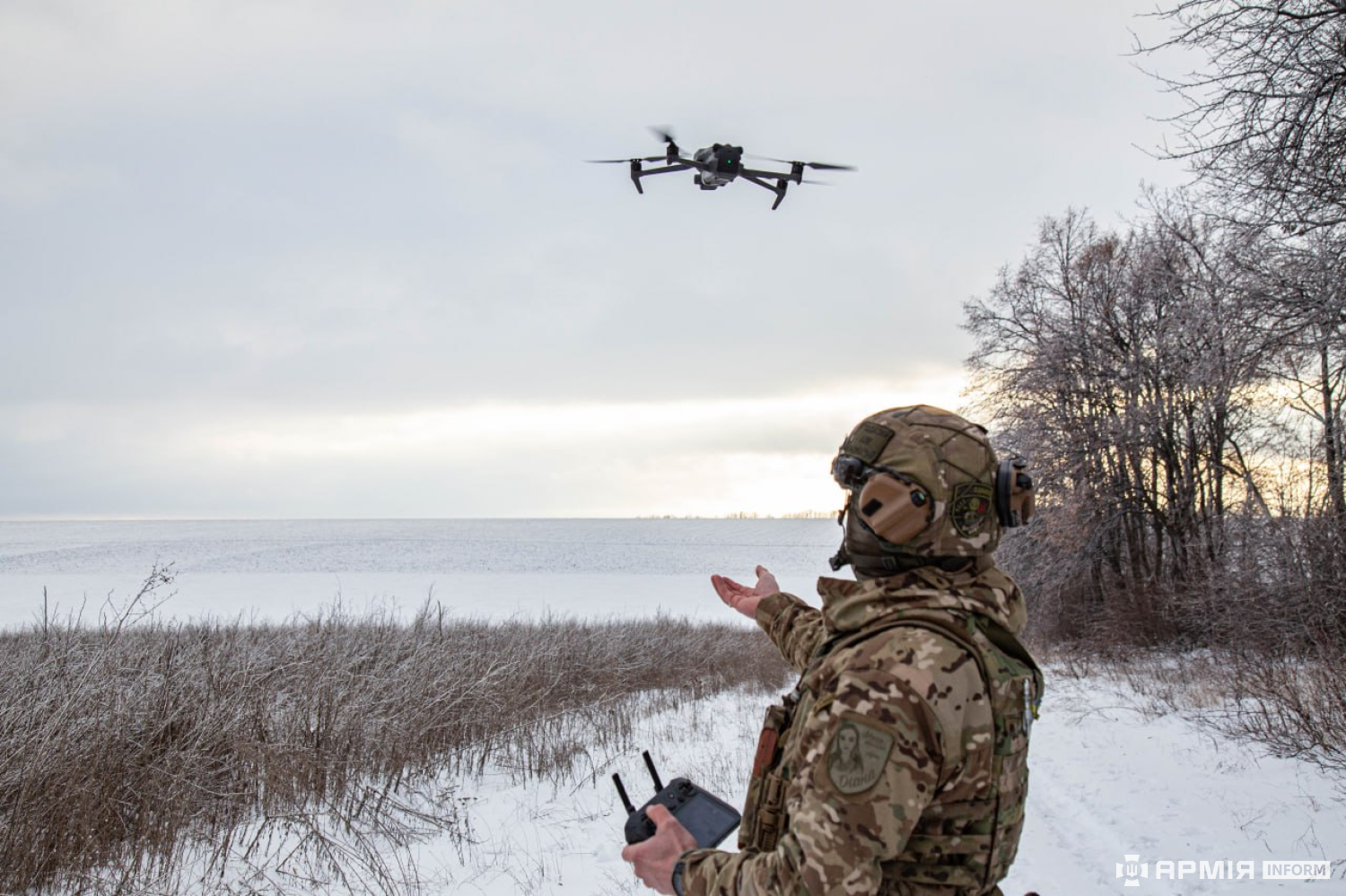
Ukrainian Border Guard serviceman operating a Mavic

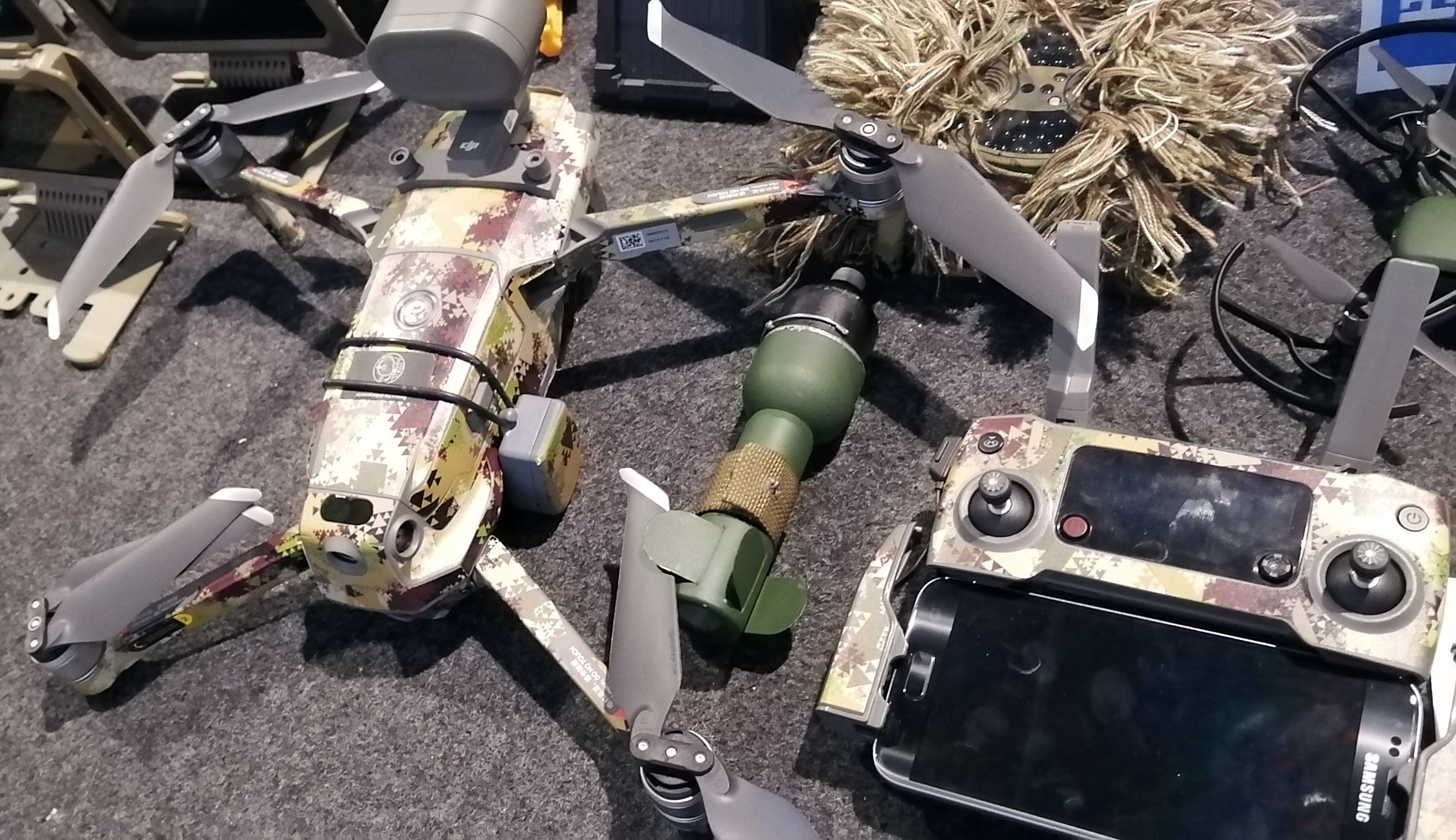
Mavic 2 Enterprise Dual modified to carry a 40 mm grenade

=== Military operators ===
Armenia

- One Armenian Mavic was reportedly shot down by Azerbaijan in April 2018.

Chile

- Chilean Navy and Marine Corps introduced the Mavic Pro in 2018.

Dominican Republic

- Dominican Armed Forces introduced the Mavic in 2019, with 3 in service as of that year.

Finland

- Finnish Army introduced the Mavic in 2019, with 150 in service as of that year.

France

- French Army introduced the Mavic in 2018.

- 35th Parachute Artillery Regiment equipped with the Mavic Pro.

Israel

- Israeli Ground Forces introduced the Mavic in 2017.

Malaysia

- Malaysian Armed Forces introduced the Mavic in 2020.

New Zealand

- New Zealand Army introduced the Mavic Pro in 2017. 26 were in service as of 2019.

Portugal

- Portuguese Special Forces operated the Mavic as of 2019.

Russia

- Russia uses Mavic drones during its invasion of Ukraine. In response, DJI has suspended all drone sales to Russia.

Ukraine

- Ukraine uses Mavic drones, including the Mavic 3 Pro, for reconnaissance, directing artillery fire, and for attacking Russian forces during the Russian invasion. In 2024, the Ministry of Defence ordered 7,200 Mavic 3E and 1,000 Mavic 3T drones. This order was conducted through Prozorro, as DJI stopped all exports to Ukraine and Russia during the war. In November 2024, it was reported that Ukraine was looking to replace its Mavics with a locally-built drone specifically designed for warfare.

United States
The use of DJI drones such as the Mavic by the United States Armed Forces has been controversial due to security concerns. In 2018, the Department of Defense banned the purchase of all commercial consumer drones for official purposes, including the Mavic, after concerns were raised by Senator Chris Murphy. The DoD specifically blacklisted DJI in 2022.

- United States Air Force controversially procured 35 Mavic Pro Platinum drones in 2018 and 57 Mavic 2 drones in 2020; the latter to be used for anti-UAV training.
- United States Marine Corps used the Mavic Pro for explosive ordinance disposal in the Middle East in 2017.

=== Government operators ===
United States

- United States Secret Service bought a total of eight Mavic 2 Pro and Phantom 4 Pro drones in July 2021.

== Accidents and incidents ==
January 2017
A 23-year-old UAV pilot from Xiaoshan was detained because of footage taken from a Mavic flying near airliners descending to land at Hangzhou Xiaoshan International Airport. The incident came to light when footage was uploaded to QQ. The footage in question was an eight-second clip from a ten-minute recording taken from an altitude of 450 metres (1,480 ft). The pilot had flown the UAV to photograph a sunset, but had also recorded several airliners flying past. DJI strongly condemned the incident.

4 June 2018
An Aérospatiale AS350BA helicopter, (N611TC) collided with a DJI Mavic 2 Zoom during an off-road truck race near Johnson Valley, California. The helicopter landed without incident and suffered significant damage which required the aircraft to be grounded and hauled off on a trailer. The drone operator was hired to fly the event and was flying the sUAS Beyond Visual Line of Sight at the time of the crash. He had not attended the air safety briefing. The drone struck the helicopter's tail rotor, causing it to fail. The pilot was able to land safely with no injuries. Both the helicopter and UAS were part of the aerial assests of the race teams chasing the off-road vehicles. A lack of coordination / communication lead to the collision. Video of the crash and the resulting damage provides documentation of the event.

10 August 2018
In the first-ever recorded mid-air collision between a UAV and a hot air balloon, the balloon, carrying a certified pilot and two passengers, was struck by a Mavic Pro while flying near the Teton County Fairgrounds in Driggs, Idaho, United States. The drone was destroyed after its rotors were sheared off on contact with the balloon's envelope and load lines, and fell to earth; the balloon suffered no significant damage and landed safely with no injuries to the pilot or passengers. The inexperienced hobbyist drone operator reportedly lost sight of the balloon in the aircraft's monitor and was operating within 5 miles (8 km) of Driggs–Reed Memorial Airport without notifying air traffic control, a violation of Federal Aviation Regulations; the balloon pilot had relied on radio communication with nearby manned aircraft and air traffic control to avoid other air traffic. The balloon pilot chose to report the incident to the National Transportation Safety Board in lieu of notifying the local sheriff's department, stating that she hoped "this incident helps create a conversation of respect for nature, the airspace, and rules and regulations."

== Specifications (Mavic 3E Enterprise) ==
Data from DJI Mavic 3E/3T user manual

General characteristics

- Length: 0.3475 m (1 ft 2 in) (0.221 m (8.7 in) folded)
- Width: 0.283 m (11 in) (0.0963 m (3.79 in) folded)
- Height: 0.1077 m (4 in) (0.0903 m (3.56 in) folded)
- Empty weight: 0.915 kg (2 lb) with propellers
- Max takeoff weight: 1.050 kg (2 lb)
- Battery capacity: 15.4V 5000 mAh (77Wh)
- Powerplant: 4 × Model 2008 brushless motor
- Propellers: 4 × 2-bladed Model 9453F

Performance

- Maximum speed: 75.6 km/h (47.0 mph, 40.8 kn) at sea level (limited to 54 km/h (34 mph) in Normal Mode)
- Range: 32 km (20 mi, 17 nmi)
- Endurance: 45 minutes
- Rate of climb: 8 m/s (1,600 ft/min) (limited to 6 m/s (1,200 ft/min) in Normal Mode)

Avionics

- Camera:

- 20MP 4/3" CMOS wide-angle
- 12MP 1/2" CMOS telephoto

- GNSS compatibility:

- GPS
- Galileo
- BeiDou
- GLONASS (with RTK module enabled)

- Transmission system: O3 Enterprise

== See also ==
Related development

- DJI Air
- DJI Mini

Aircraft of comparable role, configuration, and era

- Autel Evo
- DJI Phantom
- GoPro Karma
- Parrot Anafi
- Skydio R1
- Skydio 2
- Skydio X2
