= Skydio =

American UAV manufacturer based in San Mateo

Skydio, Inc.
- Type: Private
- Industry: Defense; Law enforcement; Security; Technology
- Founded: 2014; 12 years ago
- Founders: Adam Bry; Abe Bachrach; Matt Donahoe
- Headquarters: San Mateo, California, United States
- Key people: Adam Bry (CEO)
- Products: Unmanned aerial vehicles
- Revenue: US$100 million (2023)
- Website: skydio.com

Skydio, Inc. is an American manufacturer of drones headquartered in San Mateo, California. The company manufactures drones for use in battlefield situation awareness, policing, and inspection. Their drones can complete fully autonomous missions with the use of a dock to automatically recharge.

As of November 2024, over 50% of Skydio’s business was with military customers, particularly the United States Department of Defense with up to 22,000 reported. The drones are also used by allies of the United States, including the UK Ministry of Defence, the Israel Defense Forces, the Indian Armed Forces, the Royal Canadian Navy and in Ukraine. Skydio drones were sold in the commercial market, where they held a 4% market share as of September 2021, but in August 2023 Skydio announced they were exiting the consumer market.

Skydio drones can carry payloads, such as grenades, but they have been criticized for failing to fly at the distances advertised, or to carry substantial payloads, compared to drones designed for the consumer market such as those manufactured by DJI in China.

A 3D reconstruction application can also be purchased, which has been used to document war crimes in Ukraine during the Russian invasion, as well as inspect ships for the Royal Canadian Navy.

== History ==
Skydio was founded in 2014 by Adam Bry, Abe Bachrach, and Matt Donahoe, all of whom had studied at the Massachusetts Institute of Technology.

Bry and Bachrach were in the Robust Robotics Group, researching ways to build aircraft that could fly themselves without GPS, culminating in a fixed wing drone with a laser range finder that autonomously navigated its way around a parking lot. In 2012, Bry and Bachrach helped develop autonomous-control algorithms that could calculate a plane's trajectory and determine its location, physical orientation, velocity, and acceleration. After graduation, in 2012, Bry and Bachrach took jobs at Google working on Project Wing, an autonomous drone project. Seeing a need for autonomy in drones, in 2014, Bry, Bachrach, and Donahoe founded Skydio to fulfill their belief that drones have enormous potential across industries and applications. Early investors included venture capitalist Andreessen Horowitz.

In March 2021, the company became a 'unicorn', becoming the first US company that both manufactures and sells its own drones, to exceed US$1 billion in value.

In February 2023, Skydio announced a $230 million Series E fund-raising round and the construction of a new manufacturing facility in the USA. The Series E round was led by Linse Capital, with participation from existing investors Andreessen Horowitz, Next47, IVP, DoCoMo, Nvidia, Lockheed Martin, Walton Family Foundation, and UP.Partners. Hercules Capital, and Axon, the company behind the Taser and police body cameras, also invested in Skydio. The company claims that its drones are used in every branch of the US Department of Defense, by over half of all U.S. State Departments of Transportation and by more than 200 public safety agencies in 47 states.

In August 2023, Skydio exited the consumer drone market to focus on military, police, and industrial users.

In October 2024 Skydio was sanctioned by China after its products were approved for use by fire departments in Taiwan. The Chinese government forbade components suppliers and other businesses in China from doing business with Skydio.

On March 4, 2025, the Chinese Ministry of Commerce placed 15 U.S. entities (including Skydio) on its export control list, barring the export of dual-use commodities to that business.

== Products ==
=== Skydio R1 ===
In 2018, the company's first consumer product was the Skydio R1. The Skydio R1 had 12 cameras around the body of the drone and a gimbal stabilized 4K main camera. It had subject follow mode and obstacle avoidance. The R1 was powered by a Nvidia Jetson on-board computer. Controlling the R1 was done from the Skydio app, using on-screen height and directional toggles.

=== Skydio 2 ===
The Skydio 2 came out in October, 2019 and was priced much lower. Skydio 2 combined better obstacle avoidance, a smaller form factor and had 6 navigation cameras instead of 12 compared against the R1. The Skydio 2 also had a gimbal stabilized main camera that was capable of 4K at 60 frames per second, 3.5 km (2.2 mi) of wireless range, and 23 minute flight time. The Skydio 2 was powered by the NVIDIA Jetson TX2 embedded computing board. It could be flown by the Skydio controller, Skydio Beacon, or with the Skydio app.

Reviewers in PCMag praised the obstacle avoidance feature, but criticized the camera quality and wireless range.

==== Skydio 2+ ====
The Skydio 2+, announced in January 2022, added two omnidirectional external antennas to extend the drone's range from 3.5 km to 6 km, while the Skydio 2+ battery added 20% more flight time, and the upgraded Skydio 2+ beacon has an extended 3 km range.

=== Skydio X2 ===
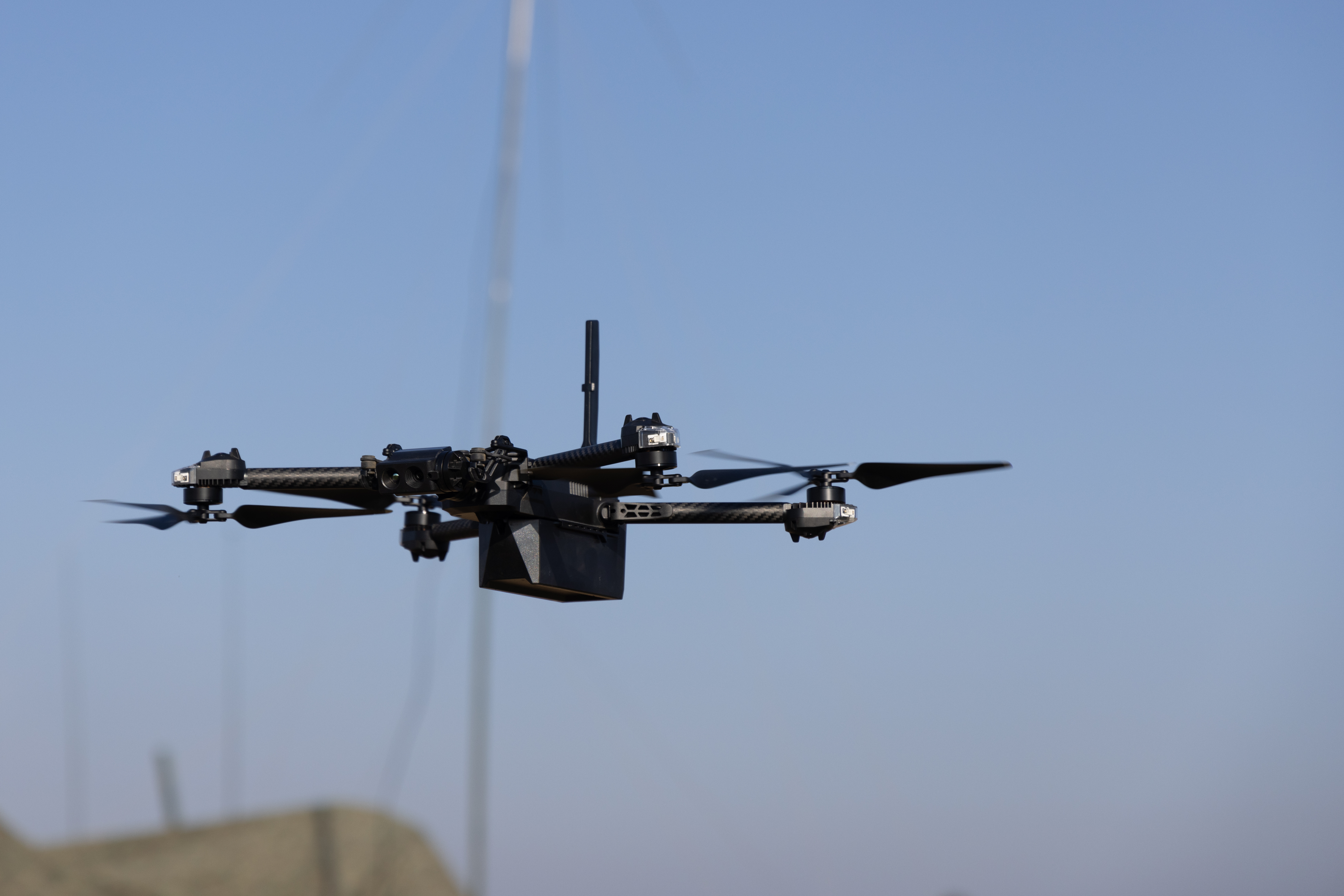
Skydio X2D in flight

In 2020, Skydio announced the X2, a drone for military and corporate use. The third-generation drone has folding arms, a thermal camera, and a new touchscreen controller. Flight time was improved to 35 minutes. It has a 12-megapixel 4k color camera with a 320 x 256 resolution Teledyne FLIR Boson thermal camera for seeing heat. The X2 uses the same Skydio Autonomy engine with 6 navigation cameras located on the outside of the drone but now with a thermal camera, 35 min flight time, range, and foldable. The X2 platform has a 14 to 109 °F (−10 to 43 °C) temperature operating range. Additionally this drone has increased supply chain security with US National Defense Authorization Act compliant certification allowing it to be used at the US federal level.

The Skydio X2 also comes in a military variant, the X2D with improved wireless capabilities and customer specific variants. The US Army version is the RQ-28A, modified to fit the requirements of the Short Range Reconnaissance (SRR) program. The Indian Army model is the Trinetra which incorporates locally manufactured components and is more resistant to high-altitude flight. In late 2024 India ordered "nearly 700" drones, the 'Indianisation' of which is carried out by AeroArc in Coimbatore, India.

=== Skydio X10 ===
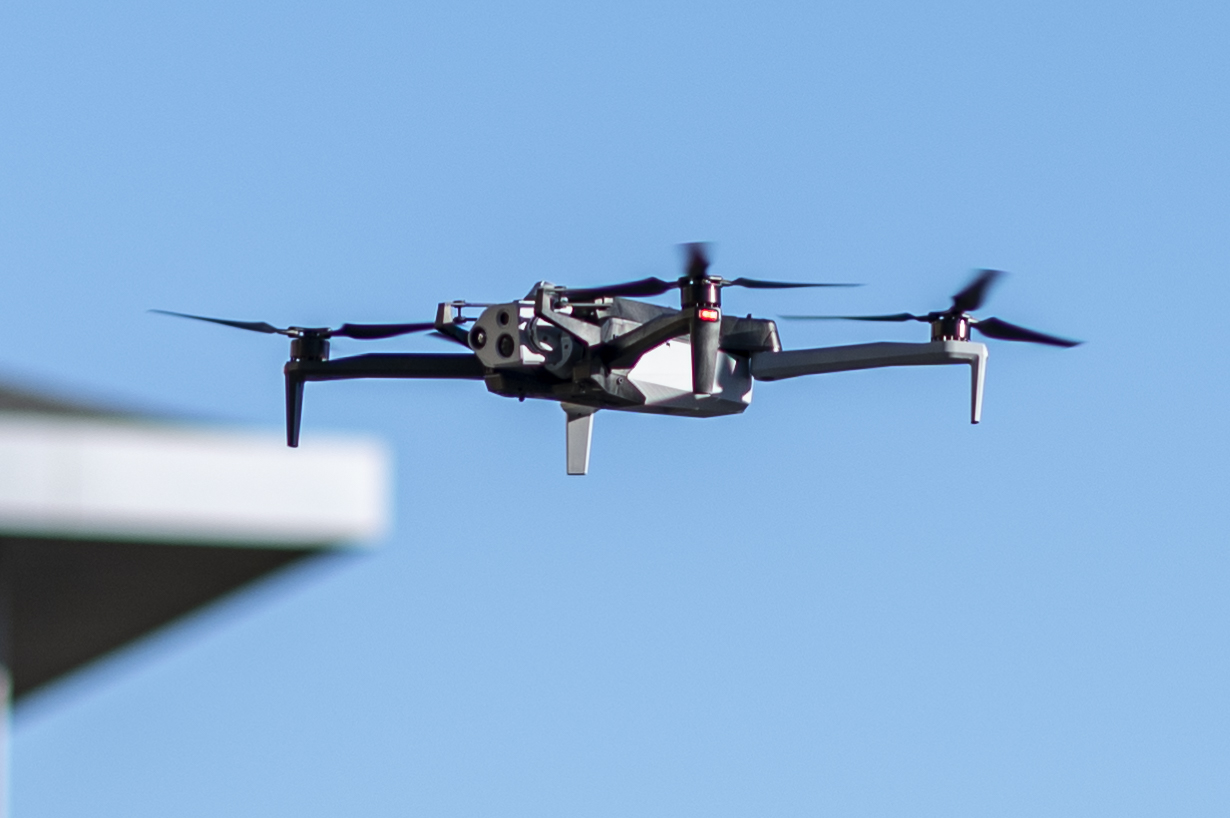
Skydio X10 in flight

The Skydio X10 was announced in September 2023 at the Skydio Ascend conference. It is a professional autonomous drone designed for a wide range of applications, including battlefield situational awareness, policing, and inspection.

The drone is equipped with multiple cameras: a 64MP narrow camera, a 48MP zoom camera capable of reading license plates at 800 feet, a 50MP wide field of view camera for detecting details as small as 0.1 mm in size, and a 640x512 Teledyne FLIR Boson+ radiometric thermal camera for measuring temperature differences during inspection missions or locating people in total darkness.

The X10 is powered by the NVIDIA Jetson Orin processor, giving it more computing power than the Skydio X2. The navigation cameras have been improved relative to earlier models as well. This allows the X10 to navigate with more confidence, avoiding thinner obstacles, in more challenging conditions. The NightSense feature enables autonomous flight in zero-light environments, so the drone can operate 24 hours. A new Onboard Modeling feature enables 3D reconstruction without need for an internet connection.

The drone's airframe is modular, featuring four payload bays, replaceable gimbal sensor packages, and an IP55 weather resistance rating. It also includes Skydio Connect, which offers connectivity options for a redesigned point-to-point link, a multi-band radio designed for contested and jammed environments, and a 5G radio for infinite range wherever there is cellular coverage. The X10 is capable of going from folded up in a backpack to in the air in less than 40 seconds.

The X10 has been criticized for not achieving the advertised wireless range in both search and rescue and battlefield situations. The X10D, a modified version, was newly released

== Military programs ==
=== Short Range Reconnaissance ===
In February 2022, Skydio won the U.S. Army Short-Range Reconnaissance (SRR) Program Tranche 1 production agreement. This contract has a first year value of $20.2 million and a total value of $99.8 million over 5 years. The Skydio X2D (RQ-28A) was integrated into the Army at the platoon level. The SRR program, which is described by the service as an effort to develop an inexpensive, rucksack-portable, vertical take-off and landing (VTOL) small unmanned aircraft to provide rapidly deployable intelligence, surveillance, and reconnaissance (ISR) capabilities. As of September 2024 as many as 22,000 Skydio drones are reported to be in US military use.

In March 2022, the Army combined SRR Tranche 2 and Tranche 3, making Tranche 2 the final Tranche of the program. Skydio competed for the SRR Tranche 2 contract with the Skydio X10D drone. However in November 2024, the final SRR contract was awarded to Red Cat Holdings, whose Black Widow drone was found to be more suitable for the Army’s needs.

As of November 2024 over 50% of Skydio’s business was with military customers, especially the US Department of Defense. Allies of the United States also using Skydio drones include the UK Ministry of Defence, the Israel Defense Forces, the Indian Armed Forces, the Royal Canadian Navy, and Ukraine.

=== Replicator ===
In November 2023, Skydio announced its intent to participate in the Replicator initiative. Replicator aims to deliver all-domain attritable autonomous systems to warfighters at a scale of multiple thousands, across multiple warfighting domains by August 2025.

== Controversies ==
=== Lobbying issues ===
Government employees have been accused of an improper relationship with the company.

=== 2026 Drone Feed Exposure ===
In July 2026, WIRED reported that a Skydio configuration error unintentionally exposed live San Francisco Police Department (SFPD) drone feeds online for several months. The breach allowed public access to real-time daylight and thermal video, drone locations, and pilot data until security researchers reported the issue and access was disabled.
