= Ryze Tello =

Chinese camera drone

Tello
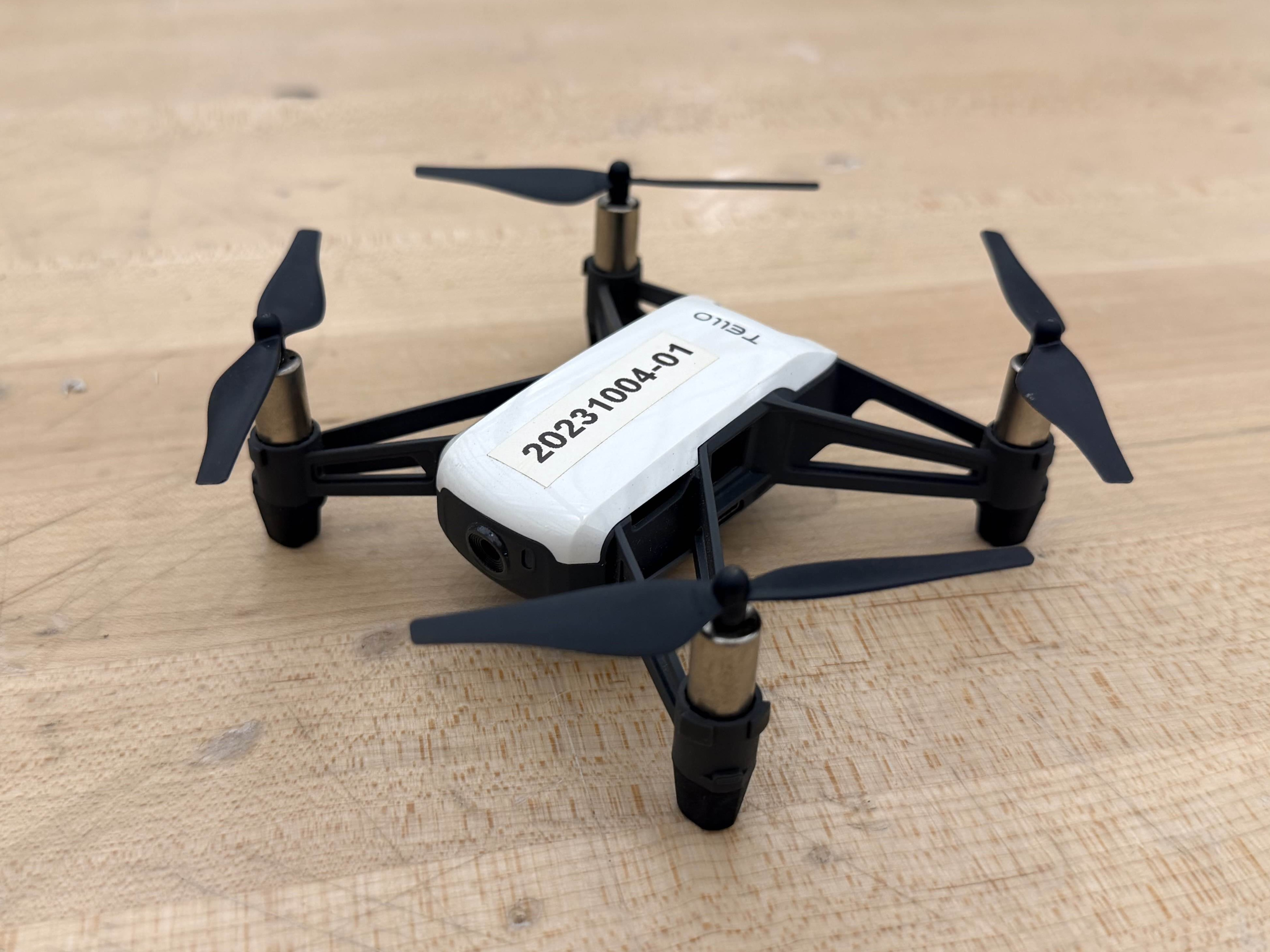
- Ryze Tello

General information
- Type: Unmanned aerial vehicle
- National origin: China
- Manufacturer: Ryze Tech / DJI
- Status: Discontinued

History
- Manufactured: 2018–2024
- Introduction date: January 2018

The Ryze Tello is a teleoperated compact quadcopter drone developed by the Chinese technology companies Ryze Tech and DJI.

== Design and development ==
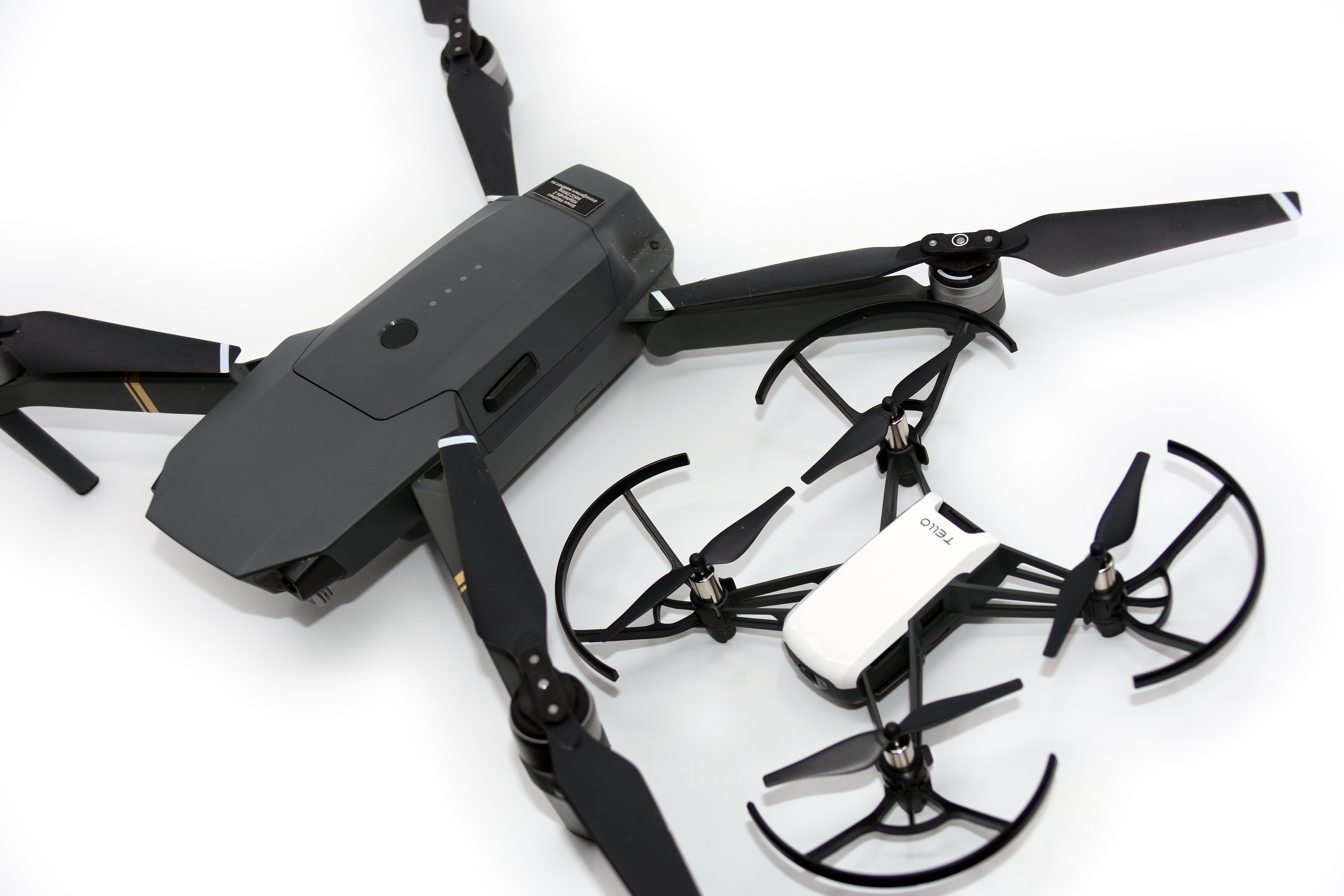
Tello compared to the larger DJI Mavic Pro

The Tello was announced at CES in January 2018 and released in Asia the following month. A collaboration between Ryze Tech and DJI, the Tello is a 80 g (2.8 oz) quadcopter with a strong resemblance to the larger DJI Spark. The drone has a 5-megapixel camera capable of shooting 720p video. The Tello also has a collision avoidance system and an integrated Intel Movidius Myriad 2 vision processing unit. The Tello is designed for indoor use and struggles in windy conditions, but its light weight exempts it from drone registration regulations in the United States.

A programmable version of the Tello, the Tello EDU, was released in November 2018 for STEM programs. The Tello EDU is compatible with the Python, Scratch, and Swift programming languages. Another educational Tello variant was released in May 2021 under DJI's RoboMaster brand as the RoboMaster TT (Tello Talent). Like the EDU, the RoboMaster TT can be programmed with Python, Scratch, and Swift, which can be used to manipulate the latter's new 8×8 LED display. The RoboMaster TT also has a built-in ESP32 microcontroller and an infrared time-of-flight sensor.

In January 2024, DJI announced the discontinuation of its educational products, including the Tello and RoboMaster series, in the United States. The company had already ceased sales of these products in Asia in December 2023.

== Variants ==
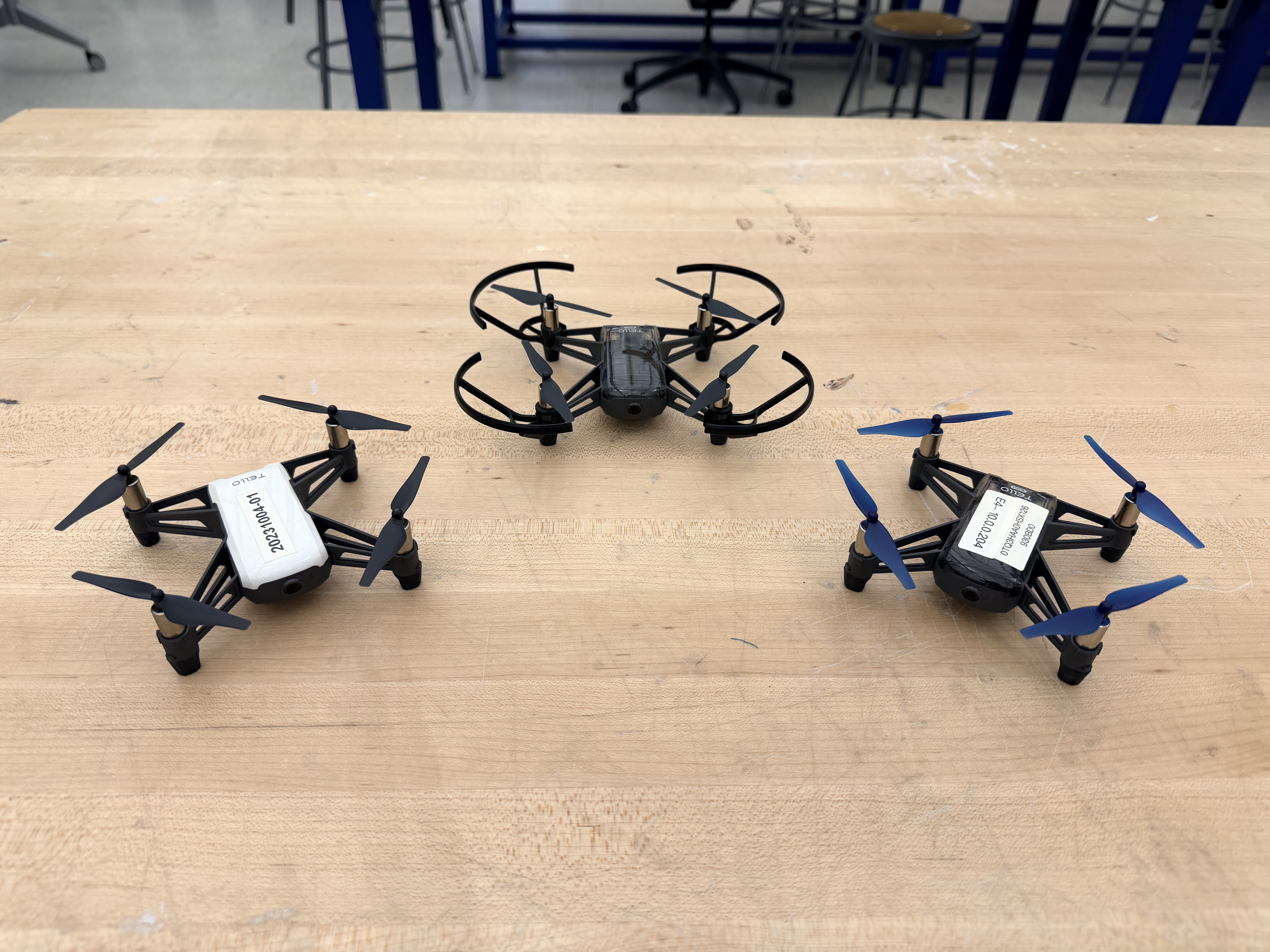
Tello (left) and two Tello EDUs. The center Tello EDU is fitted with optional propeller guards.

Tello
Company designation Model TLW004. Original variant with a 5MP camera, an Intel Movidius Myriad 2 vision processing unit, and a collision avoidance system. Announced in January 2018.
Tello EDU
Educational variant compatible with the Python, Scratch, and Swift programming languages. Released in November 2018.
RoboMaster TT
Also known as the RoboMaster Tello Talent, company designation Model TLW004. Improved Tello EDU with an ESP32 microcontroller, an 8×8 LED display, and an infrared time-of-flight sensor. Released in May 2021.

== Specifications (Tello) ==
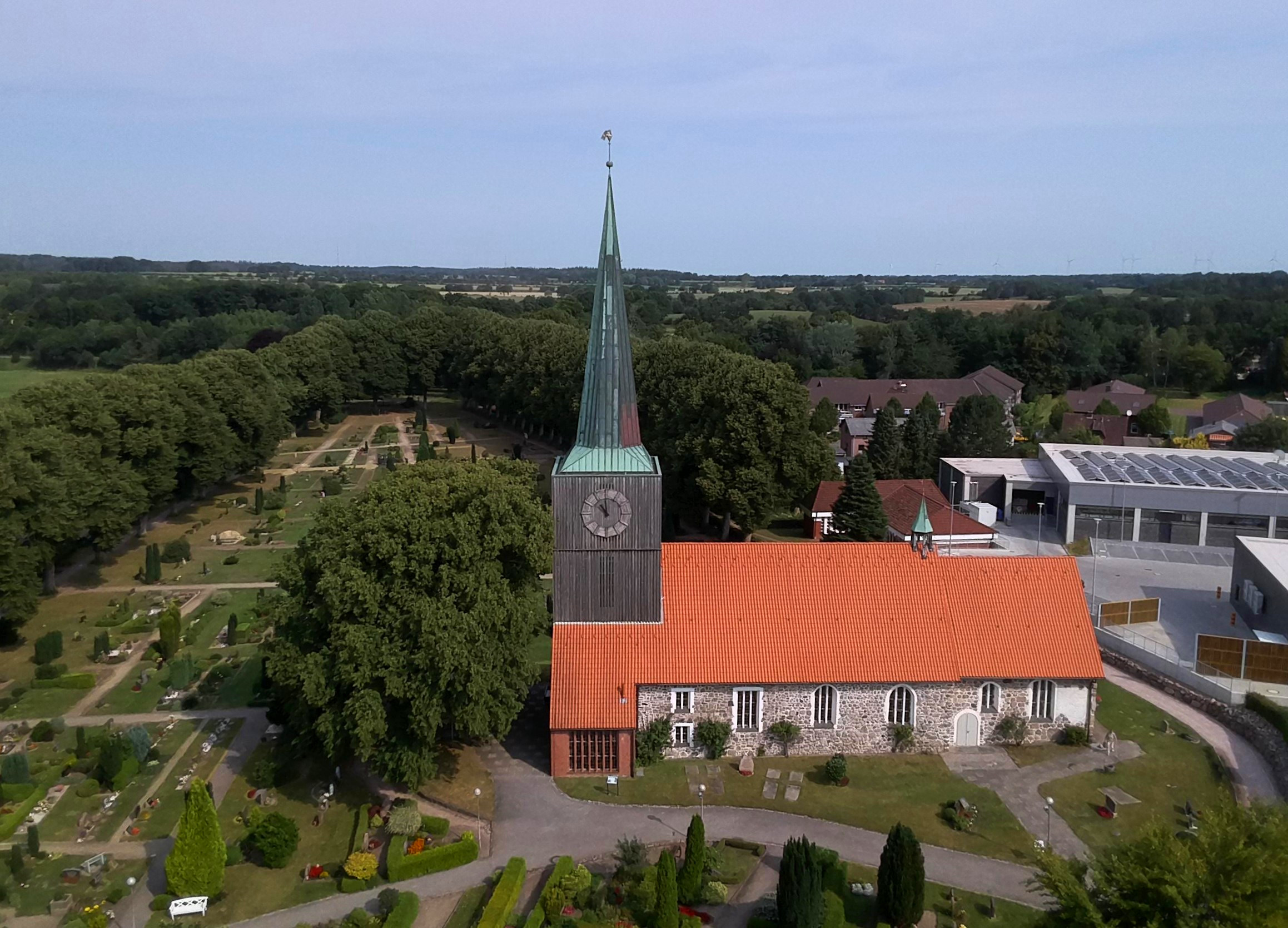
Aerial photo of St.-Remigius-Kirche, taken with a Tello

Data from

General characteristics

- Length: 0.098 m (4 in)
- Width: 0.0925 m (4 in)
- Height: 0.041 m (2 in)
- Empty weight: 0.080 kg (0.18 lb) (0.087 kg (0.19 lb) with propeller guards)
- Battery: 3.8V 1100 mAh (4.18 Wh) lithium polymer battery
- Propellers: 2-bladed DJI Model 3044P, 0.076 m (0 ft 3 in) diameter

Performance

- Maximum speed: 28.8 km/h (17.8 mph, 15.5 kn)
- Range: 0.100 km (0.062 mi, 0.054 nmi)
- Endurance: 13 minutes
- Service ceiling: 30 m (98 ft)

Avionics

- Camera: 5MP camera

== See also ==
Aircraft of comparable role, configuration, and era

- DJI Mini
- DJI Neo
- DJI Spark
- Hubsan X4
