= DJI Air =

Series of teleoperated compact quadcopter drone models

Air
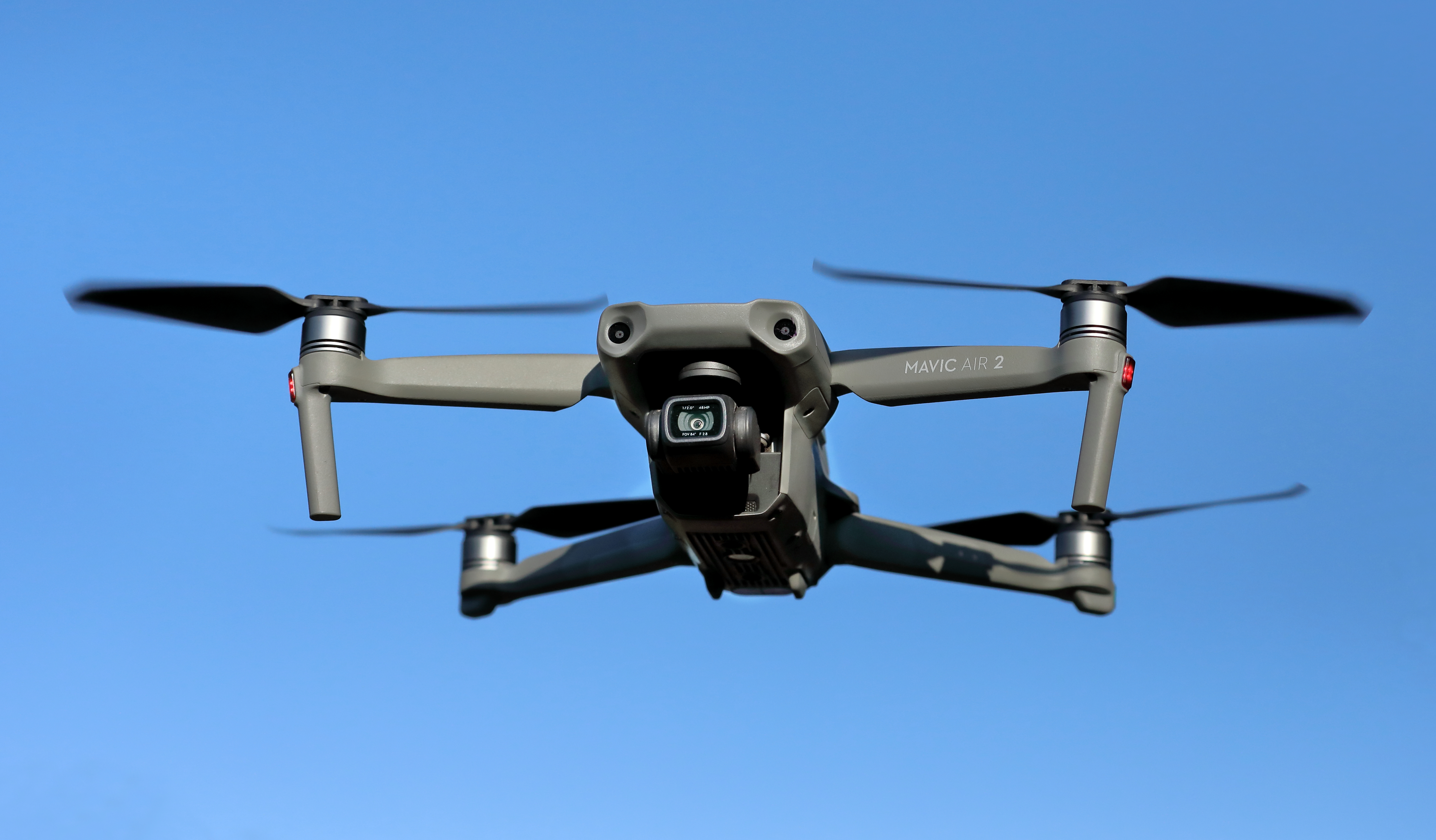
- DJI Mavic Air 2

General information
- Type: Unmanned aerial vehicle
- National origin: China
- Manufacturer: DJI; Cogito Tech
- Status: In production

History
- Manufactured: 2018–present
- Introduction date: January 2018
- Developed from: DJI Mavic

The DJI Air, originally marketed as the DJI Mavic Air, is a series of teleoperated compact quadcopter drones for personal and commercial aerial photography and videography use, released by the Chinese technology company DJI. It was developed as a more portable version of the DJI Mavic. A licensed version is produced in Malaysia by Cogito Tech as the Specta Air.

== Design and development ==
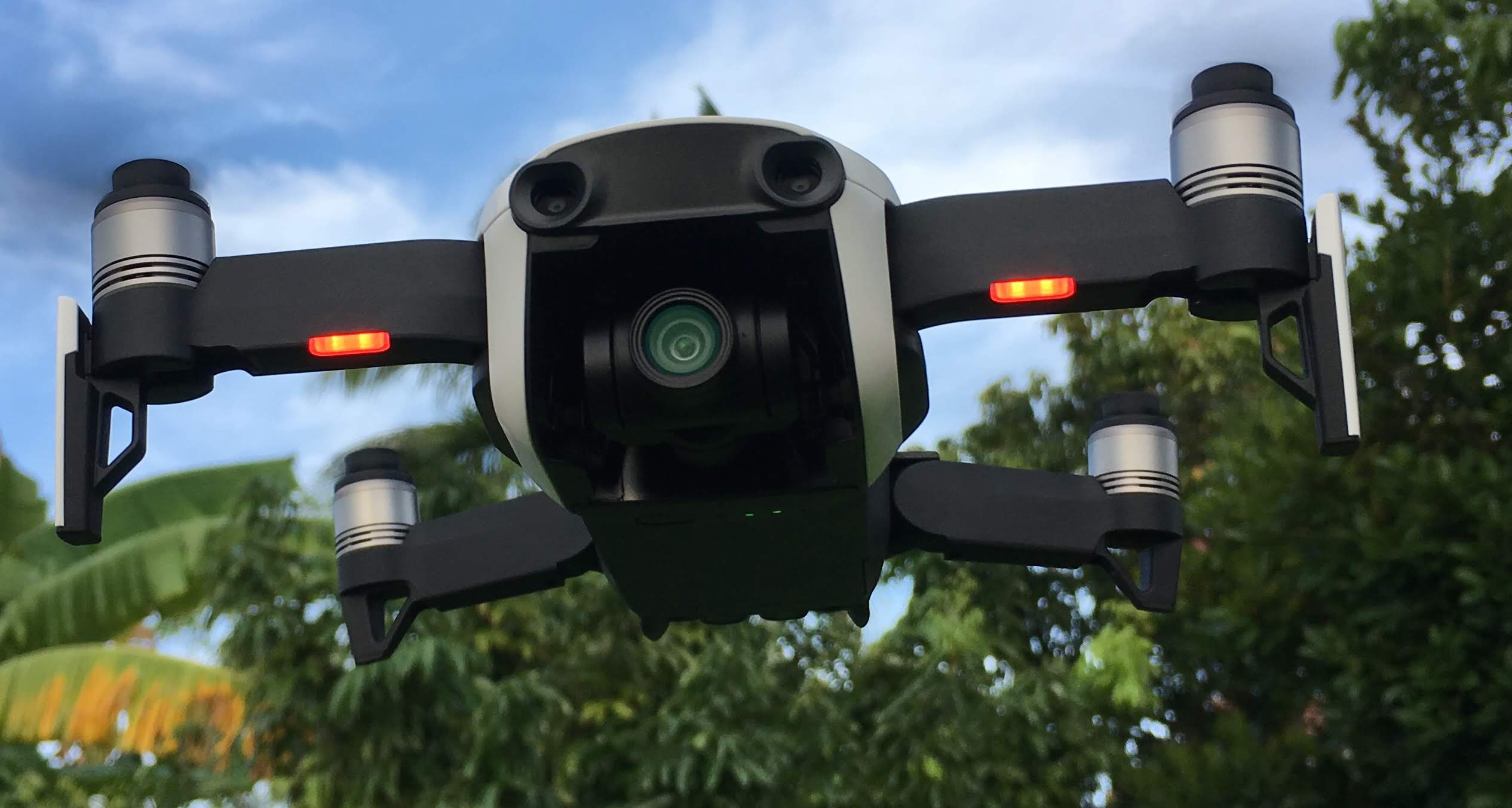
DJI Mavic Air in the air.

The Mavic Air was announced in January 2018 as a more portable development of the DJI Mavic. Like the Mavic, the Mavic Air is a foldable quadcopter, though the arms and propellers fold to be flush with the side of the drone as opposed to the Mavic's over/under configuration. This allows the Mavic Air to be half the size of the Mavic Pro and at 430 grams (0.95 lb) is 41% lighter. The Mavic Air is which was equipped with a 1/2.3" CMOS camera with a 24 mm lens on a 3-axis gimbal capable of capturing 4K video at 30 Frames per second (FPS) and 1080p video at 120FPS. The camera has a new panorama mode, which stitches together 25 photos in eight seconds to create a "Sphere Panorama". The Air also has a SmartCapture feature, a three-directional obstacle avoidance system with seven sensors, and a 2375 mAh battery giving it a maximum flight time of 21 minutes. Due to antennas mounted on its landing gear, the drone has a 2.5 mile range. Like the DJI Spark, the Mavic Air also features the "Smart Capture" mode, in which the drone can be controlled by hand gestures.

=== Mavic Air 2 series ===
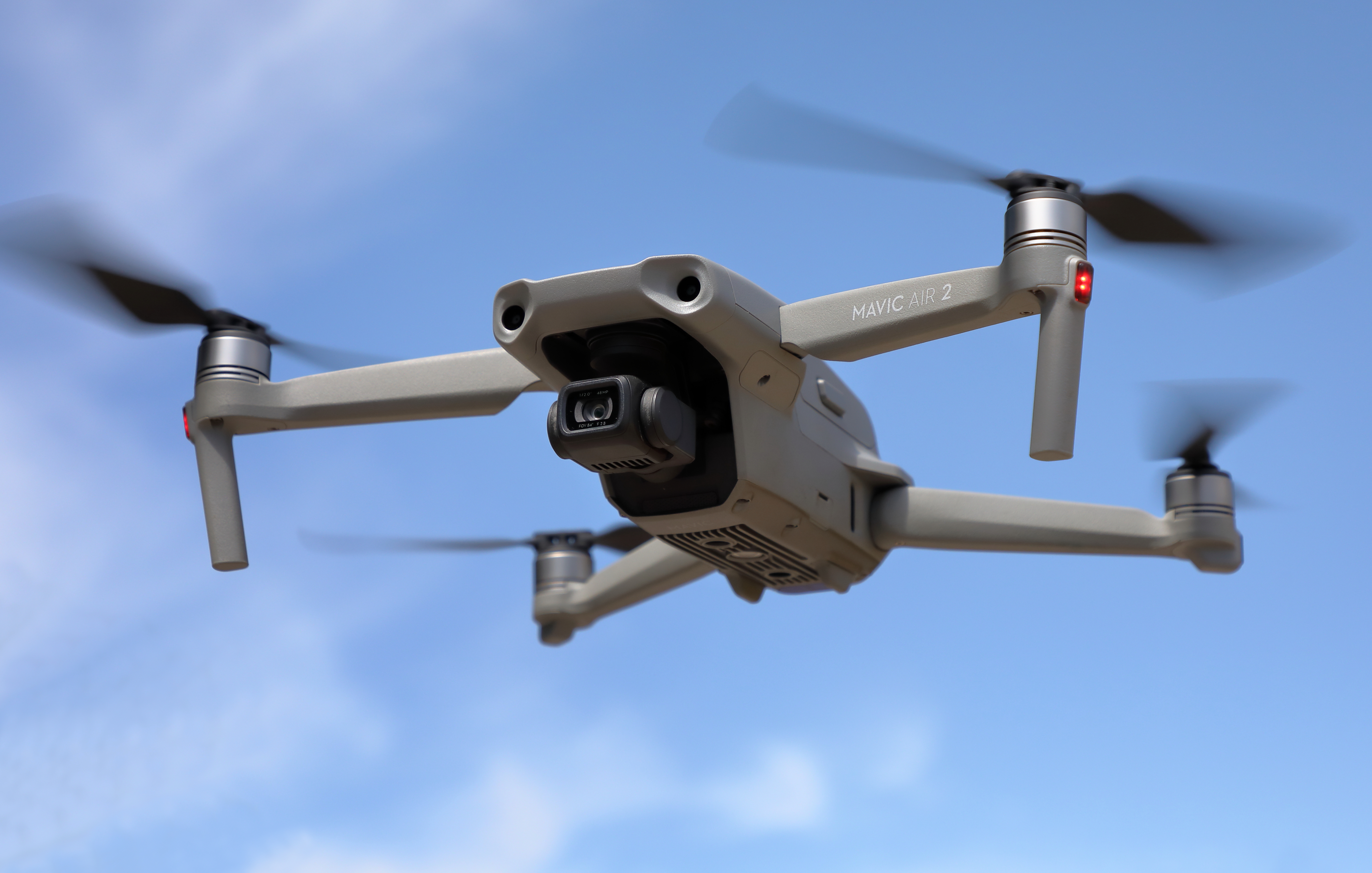
DJI Mavic Air 2 drone in flight

DJI Air 2S in flight

Announced on 27 April 2020, the Mavic Air 2 introduced a redesigned form that more closely resembles the Mavic 2 Pro than its predecessor. The Mavic Air 2 is equipped with a 1/2" CMOS camera which supports raw image format, 48-megapixel mode, HDR video, and Hyperlapse 240FPS slow-motion mode. Battery capacity was increased to 3500 mAh, giving it a maximum flight time of 34 minutes. The Wi-Fi transmission system of the original Mavic Air was replaced with the dedicated OcuSync 2.0 running in the 2.4 GHz and 5.8 GHz ranges. This promises less interference from ambient Wi-Fi networks and offers a better range of up to 10 kilometers. The Mavic Air 2 uses an Advanced Pilot Assistance Systems (APAS) 3.0 obstacle avoidance system with sensors on the front, back, and underside, but no sensors on the top and sides. Some Mavic Air 2 drones were equipped with an ADS-B safety feature that warns users about nearby aircraft, but supply chain issues caused by the COVID-19 pandemic meant that this was not available in all regions.

On 15 April 2021, DJI announced an updated version of the Mavic Air 2 as the Air 2S, dropping the Mavic name. The Air 2S features a 1" CMOS camera capable of shooting 20MP JPEG and RAW photos and up to 10-bit 5.4K video at a maximum frame of 30 FPS as well as 4K video at a maximum frame rate of 60 FPS. Maximum flight time was reduced to 31 minutes, and the transmission system was upgraded to the new O3 allowing up to 1080p resolution at 12 km (7.5 mi). The Air 2S also includes new photo and video modes such as SmartPhoto, Hyperlapse, and MasterShots allowing more flexibility of the camera capabilities. It also features an upgraded APAS 4.0 obstacle avoidance and detection system making use of sensors on the front, back, top, and bottom of the drone, as well as an ADS-B system to warn the operator of nearby aircraft.

=== Air 3 series ===
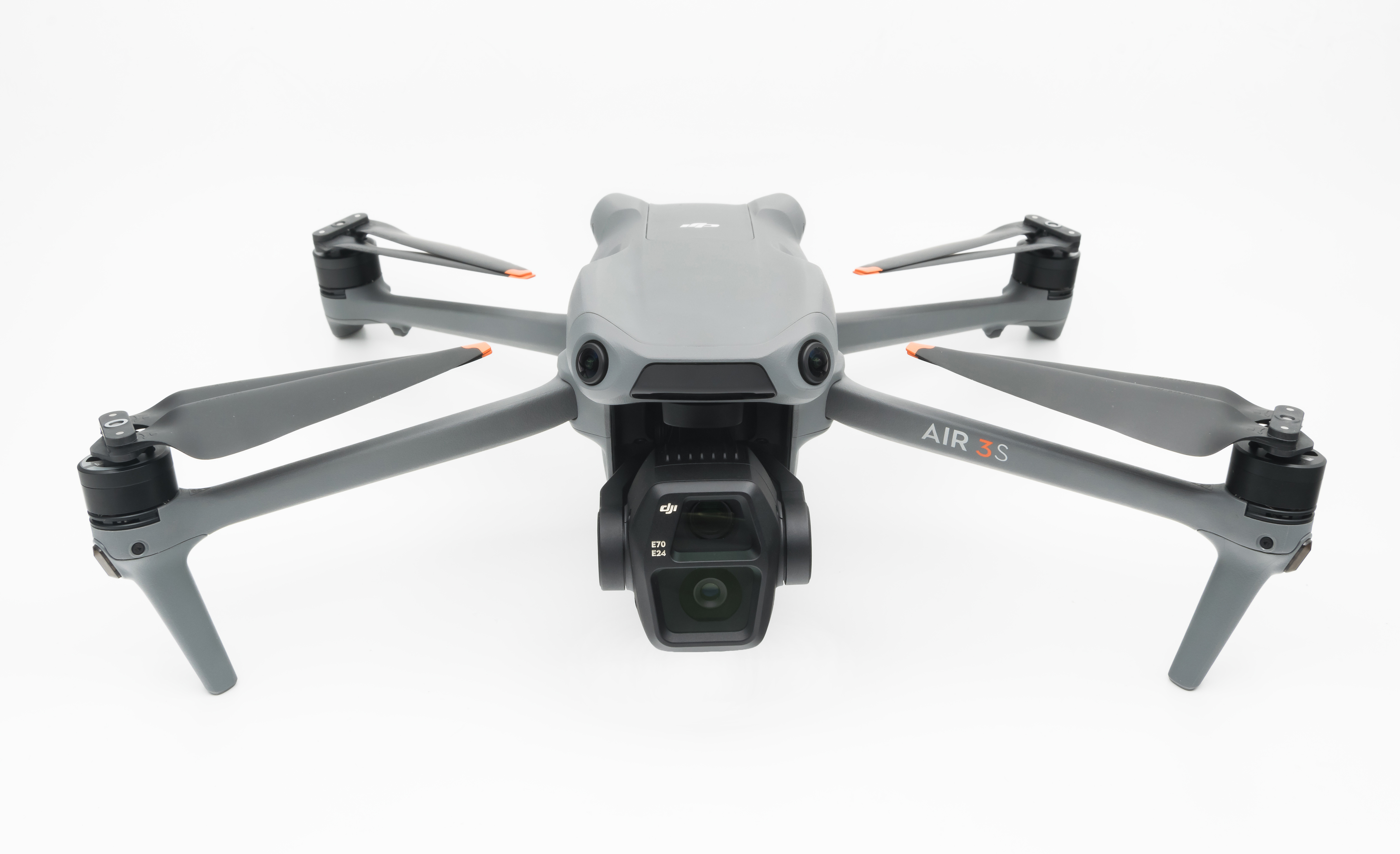
DJI Air 3S

The Air 3 was released in July 2023 and introduced several updates compared to its predecessor. The overall design was updated once again to resemble the Mavic 3 Pro, and the gimbal now mounts a dual camera system with both a wide-angle and telephoto camera. Both cameras feature a 48 MP 1/1.3" CMOS stacked sensor, and the telephoto camera is capable of 3x zoom. The drone has a weight of 720 g, which is an increase from the 595 g of the Air 2S. Most of this weight came from the battery, which was increased to 4241 mAh capacity and gives the Air 3 a maximum flight time of 46 minutes. The video transmission system was upgraded to O4, which is transmitting 1080p video up to 20 km (12 mi) away. The Verge noted that while the drone remains loud during operation, its larger propellers results in a sound that has a lower frequency and is less piercing than its predecessor.

In October 2024, DJI released the Air 3S with an upgraded 50MP 1" CMOS wide-angle camera. The drone's weight and battery capacity were slightly increased to 724 g and 4276 mAh, respectively, while flight time was slightly reduced to 45 minutes.

=== Licensed version ===
Hong Kong-based Cogito Tech produces a licensed version of the Air 3 as the Specta Air. Though Cogito denied any connection to DJI, The Hill reported the Specta Air and Specta Mini (the company's version of the DJI Mini 2 SE) are virtually identical to their Chinese counterparts, including performance and software, and likely use DJI's proprietary OcuSync video transmission system.

== Variants ==
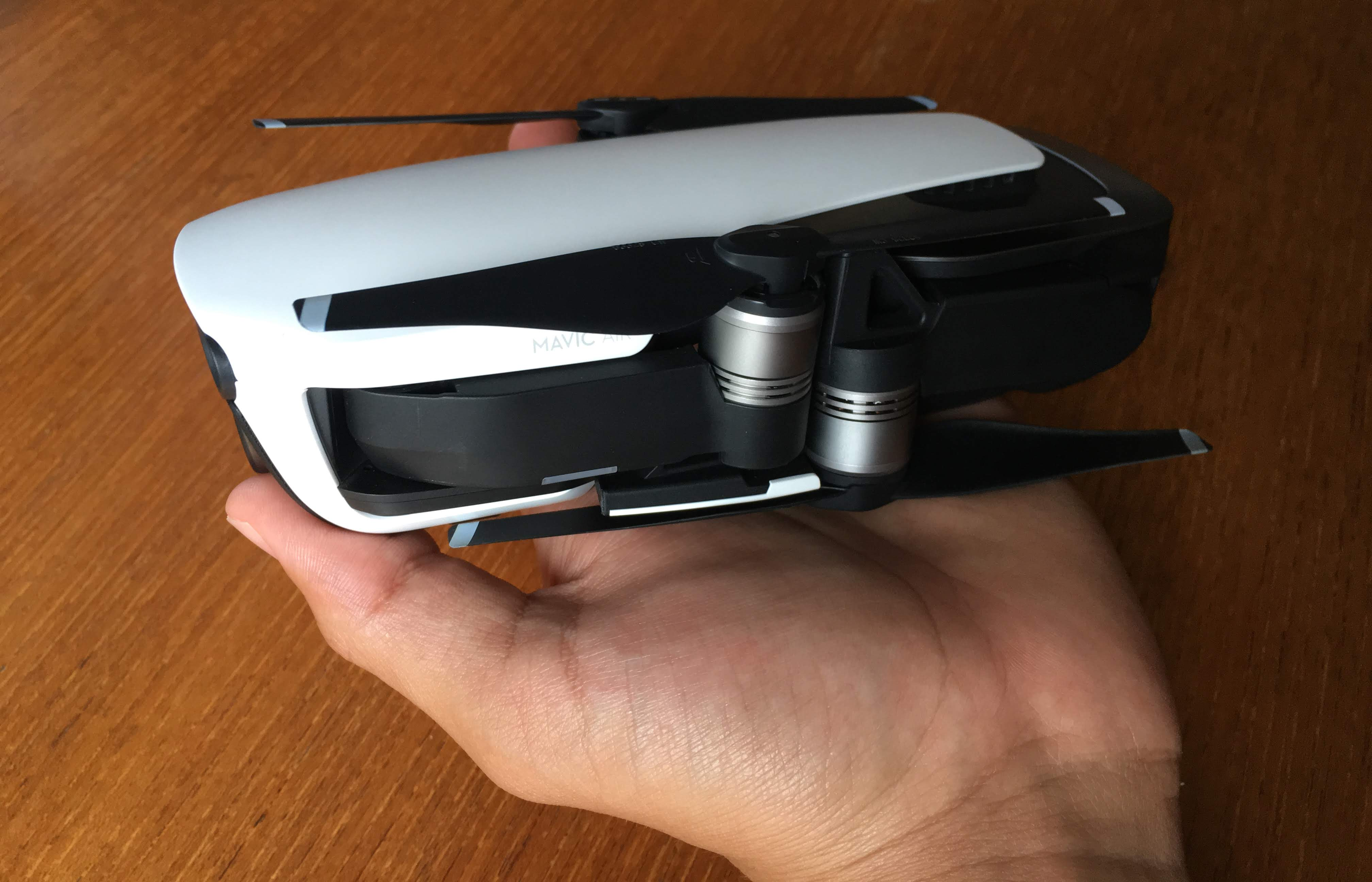
Unlike other Air models, the Mavic Air's arms and propellers fold to be flush with the sides of the drone.

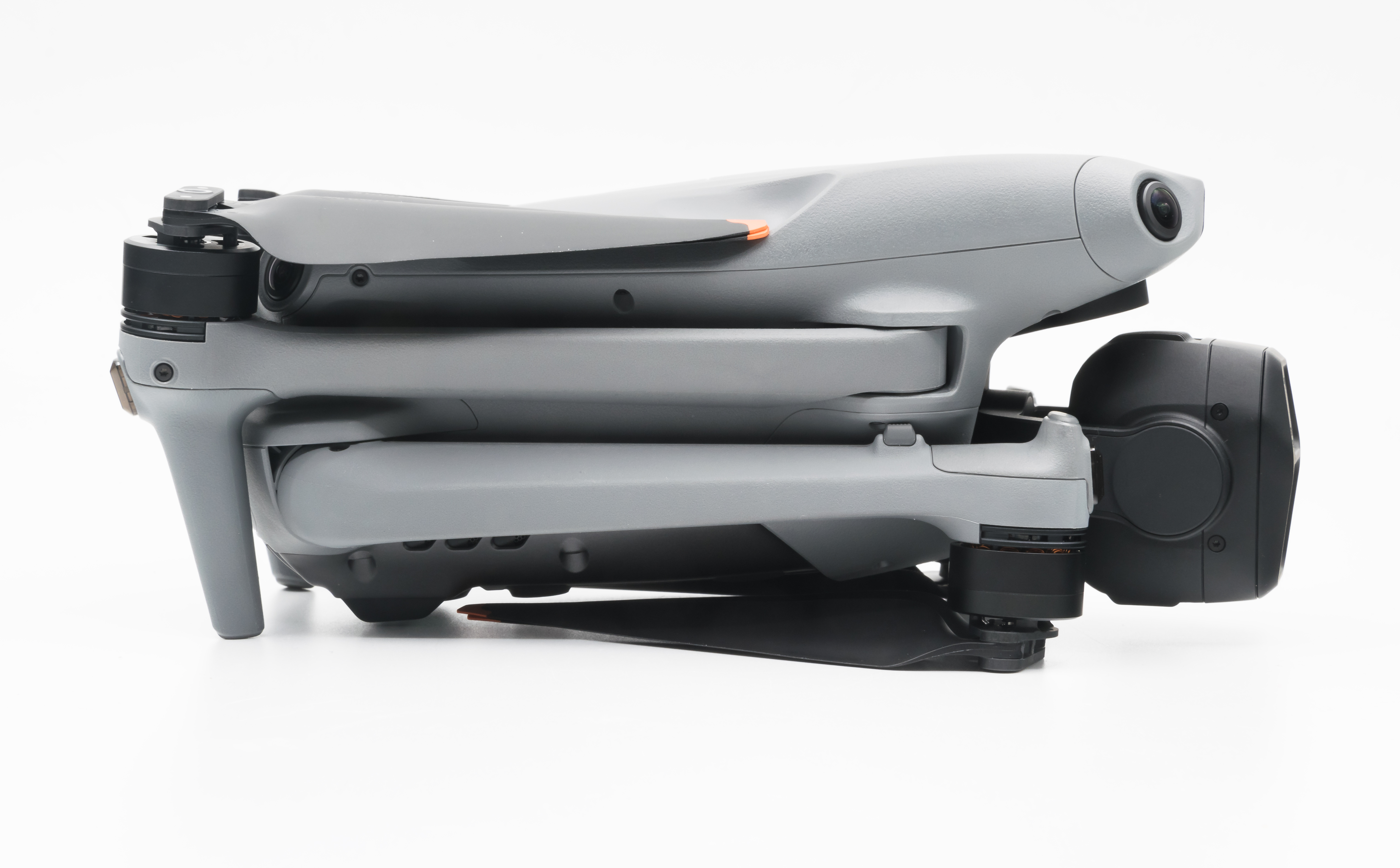
Later Air models such as the Air 3S use the over/under fold configuration typical of the Mavic family.

Mavic Air
Company designation Model U11X. Original model with flush-folding arms and propellers, a 12MP 1/2.3" CMOS camera, a Wi-Fi transmission system, and a 2375 mAh battery giving it 21 minutes of flight time. Introduced in January 2018.
Mavic Air 2
Company designation Model MA2UE1N. Redesigned to resemble the Mavic 2 Pro with over/under folding arms, a 48MP 1/2" CMOS camera, OcuSync 2.0 transmission system, APAS 3.0 obstacle avoidance system, and a 3500 mAh battery giving it 34 minutes of flight time. Introduced in April 2020. ADS-B was supposed to be standard on this model, but the COVID-19 pandemic led to this feature to only being available in some regions.
Air 2S
Company designation Model DA2SUE1. Improved Mavic Air 2 with a 20MP 1" CMOS camera, O3 transmission system, APAS 4.0 obstacle avoidance system, ADS-B as standard, and 31 minutes of flight time. Introduced in April 2021.
Air 3
Company designation Model EB3WBC. Redesigned to resemble the Mavic 3 Pro with 48 MP 1/1.3" CMOS wide-angle and telephoto cameras, O4 transmission system, and a 4241 mAh battery giving it 46 minutes of flight time. Introduced in July 2023.
Air 3S
Company designation Model CZ3SCL. Improved Air 3 with a 50MP 1" CMOS wide-angle camera and a 4276 mAh battery giving it 45 minutes of flight time. Introduced in October 2024.
Specta Air
Also known as the Specta, company designation Model TQFDUB2. Licensed derivative of the Air 3 built in Malaysia by Cogito Tech.

== Specifications (Air 3S) ==
Data from DJI

General characteristics

- Length: 0.26611 m (10 in) (0.21419 m (8.433 in) folded)
- Width: 0.32547 m (1 ft 1 in) (0.10063 m (3.962 in) folded)
- Height: 0.106 m (4 in) (0.08917 m (3.511 in) folded)
- Empty weight: 0.724 kg (2 lb)
- Battery capacity: 4276 mAh

Performance

- Maximum speed: 75.6 km/h (47.0 mph, 40.8 kn) at sea level
- Range: 32 km (20 mi, 17 nmi)
- Endurance: 45 minutes
- Rate of climb: 10 m/s (2,000 ft/min)

Avionics

- Camera:

- 50MP 1" CMOS wide-angle
- 48MP 1/1.3" CMOS telephoto

- GNSS compatibility:

- GPS
- Galileo
- BeiDou

- Transmission system: O4

== See also ==
Related development

- DJI Mavic
- DJI Mini

Aircraft of comparable role, configuration, and era

- Autel Evo
- DJI Phantom
- GoPro Karma
- Parrot Anafi
- Skydio R1
