= DJI Spark =

Chinese camera drone

Spark 晓
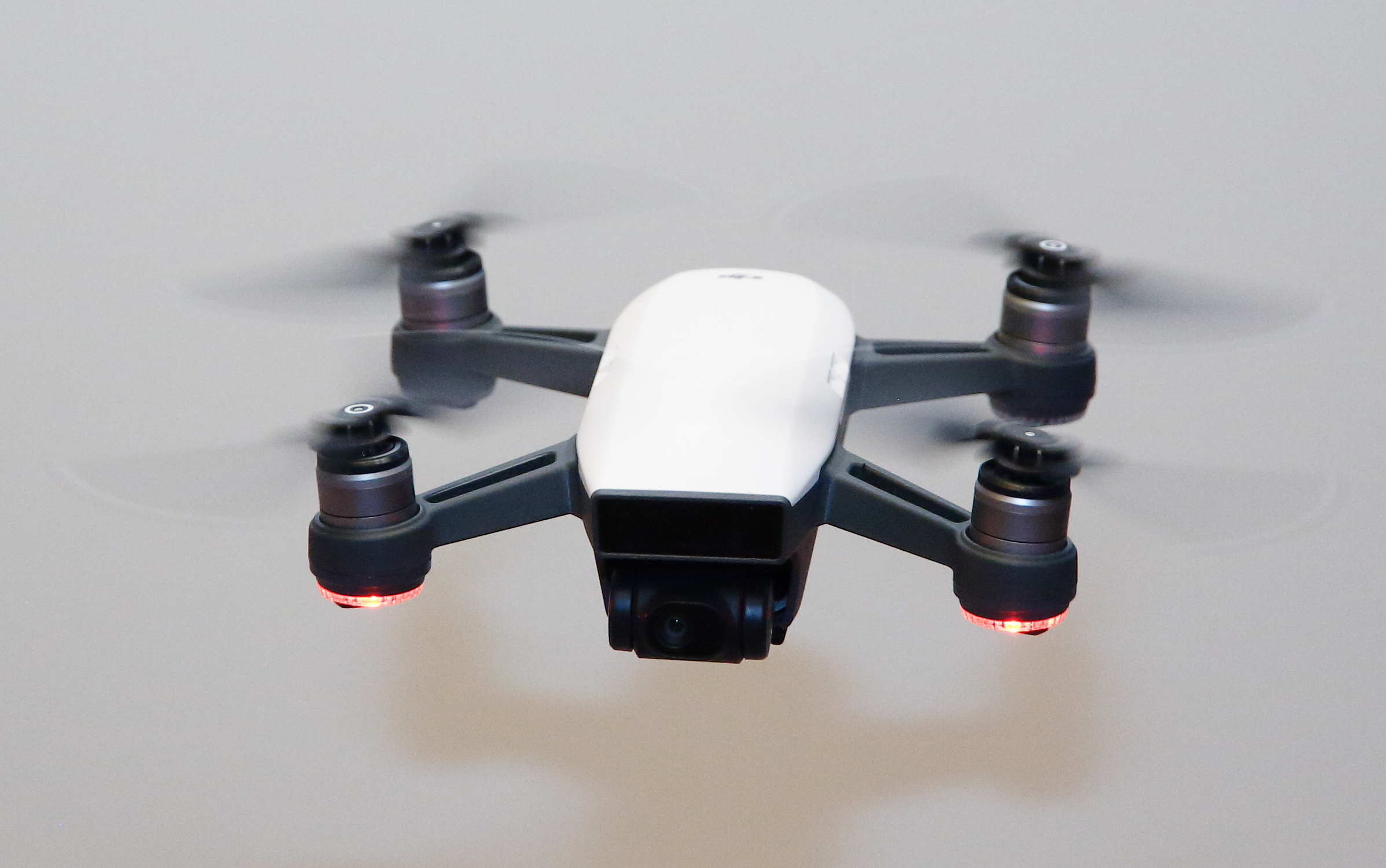
- DJI Spark

General information
- Type: Unmanned aerial vehicle
- National origin: China
- Manufacturer: DJI
- Status: Discontinued

History
- Manufactured: 2017–2019
- Introduction date: May 2017

The DJI Spark (company designation Model MM1A) is a teleoperated compact quadcopter drone for personal and commercial aerial photography and videography use, released by the Chinese technology company DJI. The Spark had a short production run of only two years before it was replaced by the Mavic Mini.

== Design and development ==
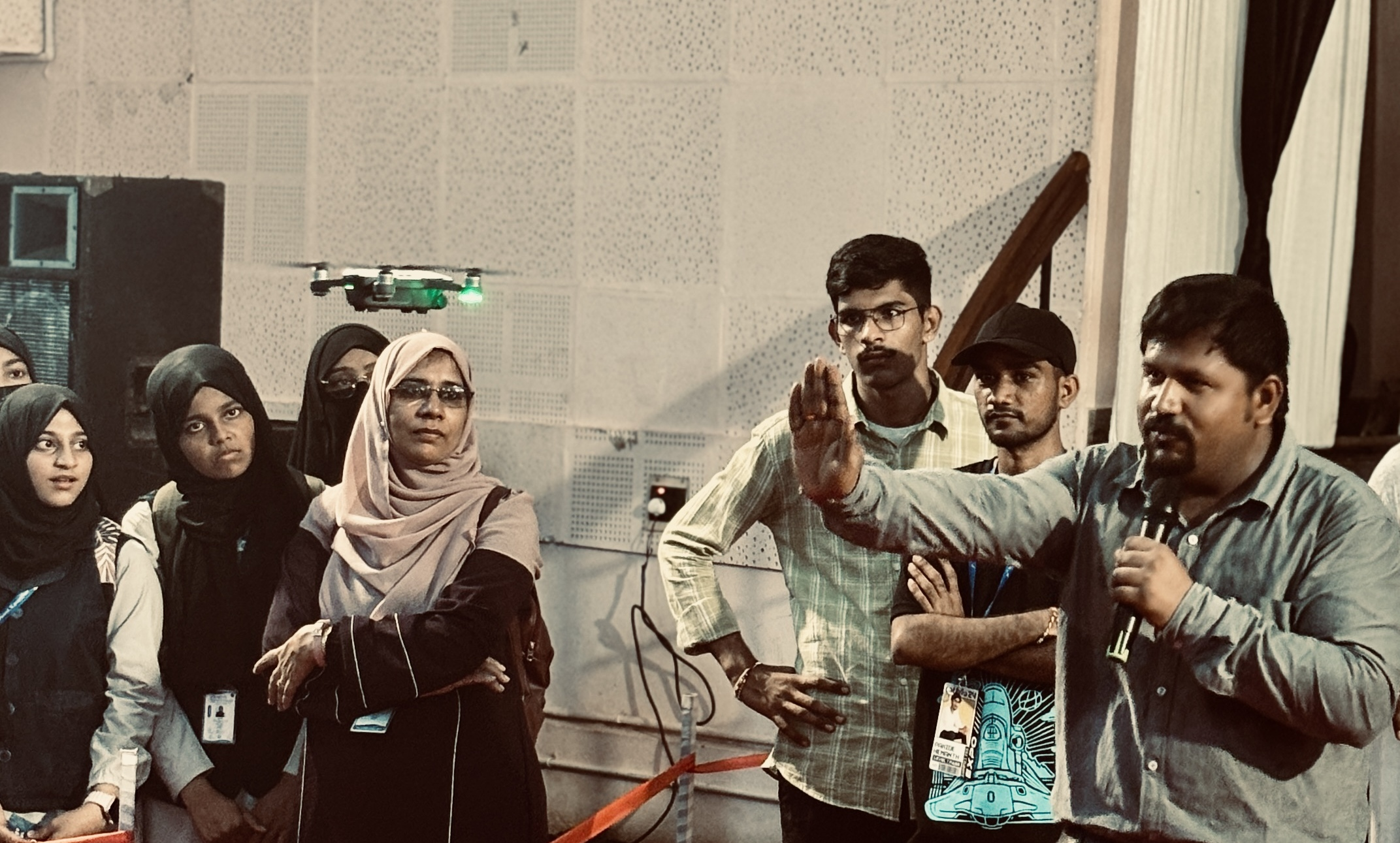
DJI Spark being controlled with hand gestures.

DJI announced the Spark in May 2017. The Spark is a small quadcopter with forward and downward obstacle avoidance sensors and satellite navigation. The drone is lighter and smaller than the company's Mavic Pro, but lacks folding arms, making it roughly the same size as a folded Mavic. The Spark has a 12-megapixel camera with a 1/2.3" CMOS sensor mounted on a two-axis gimbal capable of capturing 1080p video at 30 frames per second. The Spark was the first DJI drone to be controlled by hand gestures. Originally, users controlling the drone with hand gestures still had to use their phone to control the camera, but a software update in August 2017 added the ability to record video with a new set of gestures.

Upon release, the Spark competed with drones such as the GoPro Karma and Yuneec International Breeze. After reports of Spark drones falling from the sky in August 2017, DJI identified the issue as a software bug and released a firmware update to fix it. DJI also remotely grounded any drones that did not receive the update.

In August 2018, DJI collaborated with Line Friends to release a version of the Spark marked to represent the character Brown.

The Spark was replaced by the Mavic Mini in 2019. Unlike the Spark, which is required to be registered in most countries due to its 300 g (0.66 lb) weight, the Mavic Mini was designed to bypass drone registration regulations by weighing under 250 g (0.55 lb).

== Specifications (Spark) ==
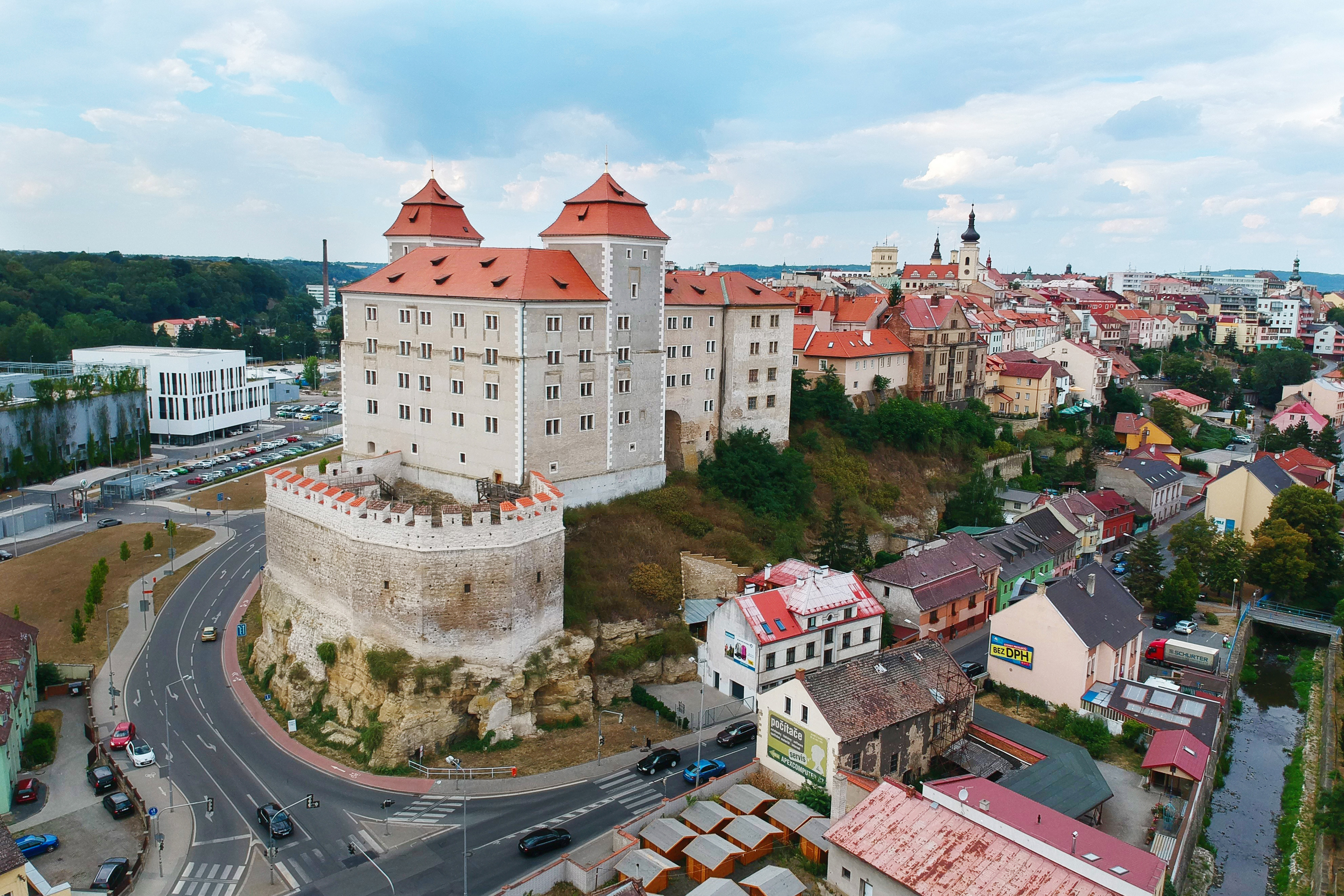
Aerial photo of Mladá Boleslav Castle taken with a Spark.

Data from DJI Spark manual

General characteristics

- Length: 0.143 m (6 in)
- Width: 0.143 m (6 in)
- Height: 0.055 m (2 in)
- Empty weight: 0.300 kg (1 lb)
- Battery capacity: 1480 mAh

Performance

- Maximum speed: 50 km/h (31 mph, 27 kn)
- Endurance: 16 minutes
- Service ceiling: 4,000 m (13,123 ft) above sea level
- Rate of climb: 3.0 m/s (588 ft/min)

Avionics

- Camera: 12-megapixel 1/2.3" CMOS sensor
- GNSS compatibility: GPS, GLONASS
- Transmission system: Wi-Fi

== See also ==
Aircraft of comparable role, configuration, and era

- DJI Mini
- Parrot Bebop
- Ryze Tello
