= Autel Evo =

Series of Chinese camera drones

Evo
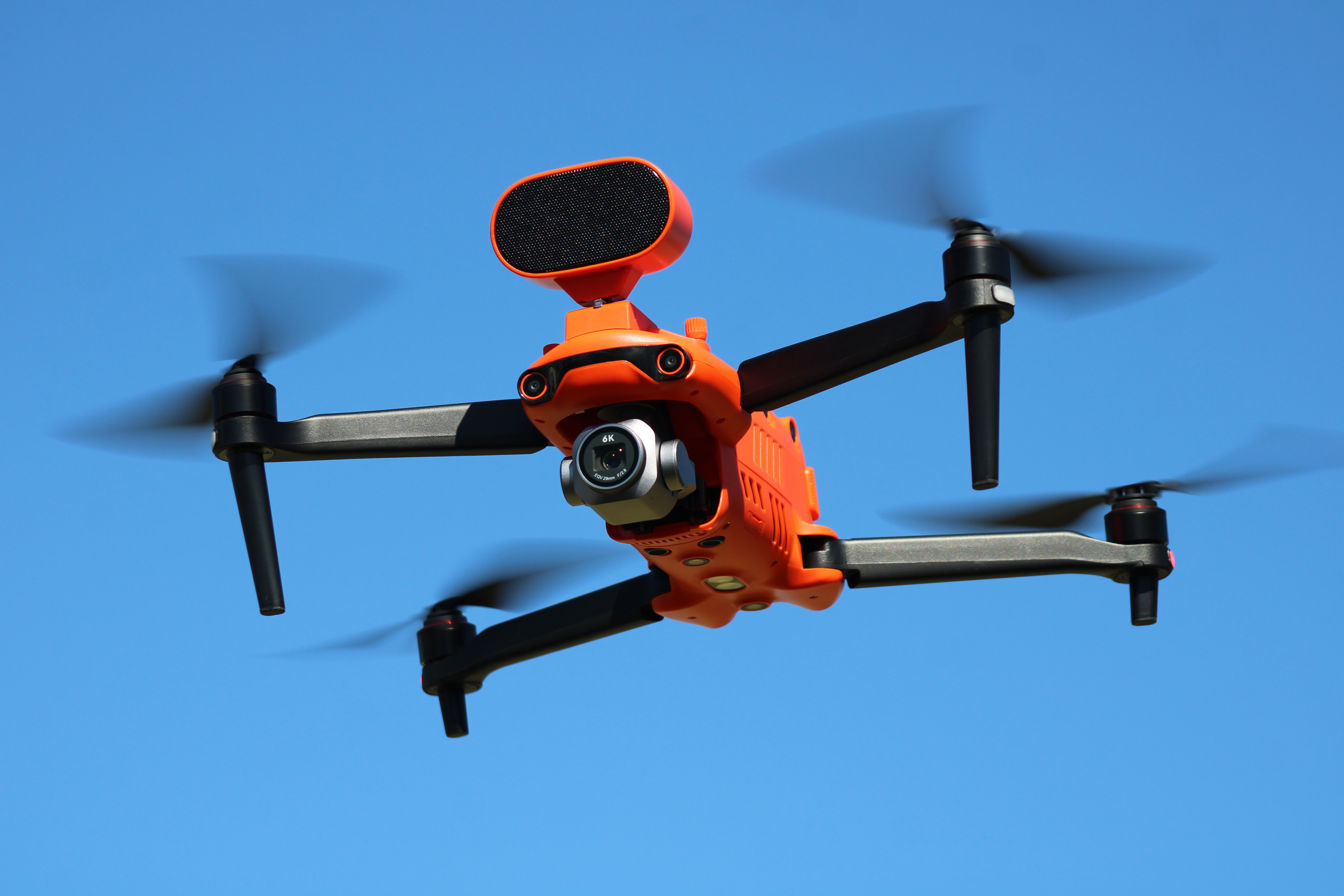
- Evo II Pro Enterprise V3 with a loudspeaker attachment

General information
- Type: Unmanned aerial vehicle
- National origin: China
- Manufacturer: Autel Robotics
- Status: In production

History
- Manufactured: 2018–present
- Introduction date: January 2018

The Autel Evo (officially stylized as Autel EVO) is a series of quadcopter camera drones released by the Chinese technology company Autel Robotics.

== Design and development ==
The Evo was announced at CES in January 2018 as a portable camera drone for the consumer market. The drone features a foldable design for portability similar to the competing DJI Mavic, as well as a bright orange color scheme for high visibility. The Evo's 4K 12-megapixel camera has a 1/2.8-inch sensor and is mounted on a three-axis XI-5A gimbal. The drone has forward-looking obstacle avoidance system, allowing it to evade obstacles even while tracking a moving subject. The Evo is powered by a 4300 mAh lithium polymer battery, which Autel claimed would give the drone a flight time of 30 minutes, though flight testing by Fstoppers revealed the actual flight time to be 22 to 23 minutes.

The successor to the original Evo, the Evo II series, was announced in January 2020 as a direct competitor to the DJI Mavic 2. The Evo II series was initially released in three models, each differing primarily in their camera suite; the baseline Evo II, the Evo II Pro, and Evo II Dual. The baseline Evo II features an 8K 48MP camera with a 1/2" CMOS sensor, while the Evo II Pro substitutes this with a 6K camera with a 1" sensor. The Evo II Dual uses the same 8K visual-spectrum camera as the baseline Evo II, but also has an FLIR Boson thermal camera. All three models have 8GB of internal data storage and have an increased flight time of 35 to 40 minutes. The drone uses an improved Dynamic Track 2.0 system that is capable of tracking up to 64 subjects. The obstacle avoidance system was also upgraded with 12 visual sensors, giving it omnidirectional sensing capabilities. In response to restrictions on the use of Chinese technology within the United States government, Autel offered a version of the Evo II Dual marketed as "made in the USA" with 75% of its components being assembled in the US.

More models were later added to the Evo II series, including the Evo II Dual 640T capable of continuous shooting. Announced alongside the Autel DragonFish at CES in January 2021, the Evo II Pro RTK and Evo II Dual 640T RTK added real-time kinematic (RTK) positioning capabilities at the cost of flight time being reduced by several minutes. In September 2021, Autel announced the Evo II Pro Enterprise and Evo II Dual 640T Enterprise with an ADS-B receiver, an increased flight time of 42 minutes, and an attachment point for external accessories, including a loudspeaker, a strobe light, a spotlight, and an optional RTK Module.

By 2021, production of the Evo II series had become difficult due to the contemporary global chip shortage. In response to the shortage, Autel released the Evo II V2 series in September 2021 with a new chipset. The Evo II V2 series is functionally similar to the "V1" series, though the differing chipsets prohibit cross-compatibility between the two series' their controllers. The Evo II V2 series was released in several variants; the Evo II Pro V2 and Evo II Dual 640T V2, as well as their respective RTK and Enterprise variants. Support for the Evo II V2 series was scheduled to end in October 2025.

The Evo II V3 series was announced at IFA Berlin in September 2022 as the successor to the V2. Improvements over the V2 include higher image resolution, improved low-light and thermal imaging performance, and multi-GNSS positioning. The V3 is also more durable than the V2, and has improved heat dissipation. As with the V2, the V3 series was released in six variants; the Evo II Pro V3 and Evo II Dual 640T V3, as well as their respective RTK and Enterprise variants. A drone branded as the "Patriot K30T" but with the appearance and specifications of the Evo II V3 was showcased at the St. Petersburg International Economic Forum in 2023, leading to speculation that Autel had rebranded the latter drone for the Russian market due to the Russia's invasion of Ukraine.

=== Evo Nano/Lite ===
In September 2021, Autel announced the smaller Evo Nano series as an entry-level model. A competitor to the DJI Mini, the Evo Nano weighs 249 g (0.549 lb) and has a three-direction binocular obstacle avoidance system and a 2250 mAh battery, giving the drone a flight time of 28 minutes. The Nano series consists of two models; the baseline Evo Nano with a 1/2" CMOS sensor and the Evo Nano+ with a 1/1.28" sensor. The Nano series was offered with four different color options, including the orange color typical of Autel drones.

The Evo Lite series was announced alongside the Nano. The Evo Lite, which has been compared to the DJI Air, is heavier than the Nano at 835 g (1.841 lb) and has a flight time of 40 minutes. Like the Nano, the Lite series was initially released in two models; the baseline Evo Lite with a 1/1.28" CMOS sensor and the Evo Lite+ with a 1" sensor. The Evo Lite Enterprise series was launched in August 2024. This series consists of two variants; the Evo Lite 6K Enterprise with a 1" CMOS visible-spectrum camera and the Evo Lite 640T Enterprise with a dual visible/thermal camera system.

Both the Evo Nano and consumer Lite series were discontinued in July 2025 as Autel stepped out of the consumer drone market and shifted focus to its enterprise line. The Evo Lite Enterprise series was unaffected by this change.

=== Evo Max ===
The first variant of the Evo Max series, the Evo Max 4T, was announced at CES in January 2023. The Evo Max 4T was designed for industrial and first responder use with an IP43 protection rating and has a triple-camera suite; a 50MP wide-angle camera, an 8K 48MP camera with up to 10× optical zoom and 160× digital zoom, and a 640×512 thermal camera with 16× digital zoom. All three cameras are mounted on a single three-axis gimbal, which also has a laser rangefinder. The drone's obstacle avoidance system combines binocular visual sensors with mmWave radar for increased accuracy and operations in rainy conditions. Another model, the Evo Max 4N, was publicly demonstrated in May 2023 with a night vision zoom camera. By August 2024, the Evo Max 4T XE had also been released with a new "FusionLight" camera system, which has a 48MP wide-angle camera alongside the zoom and thermal cameras.

A "V2" series of the Evo Max has also been released; the Evo Max 4T V2, Evo Max 4N V2, and Evo Max 4NZ V2. The Evo Max 4T V2 uses the same camera suite as the Evo Max 4T XE. The Evo Max 4N V2 has a night vision zoom camera in addition to the wide-angle and thermal cameras. On the Evo Max 4NZ V2, the wide-angle camera is also night vision capable.

== Variants ==
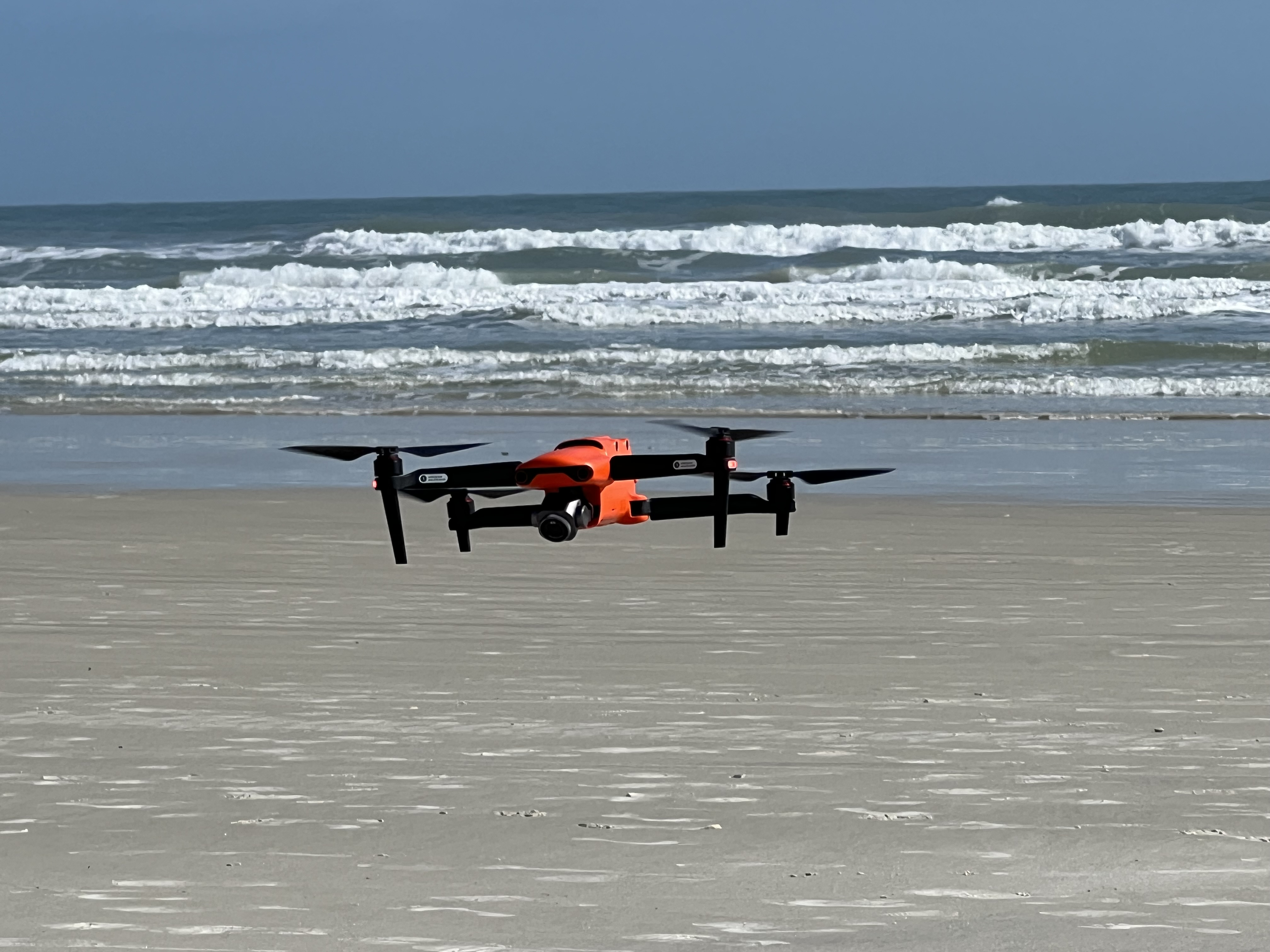
Evo II Pro V2 flying over the shore of Daytona Beach, Florida.

Evo
Also known as the Evo Pro. Original model with a 4K 12MP 1/2.8 CMOS camera mounted on an XI-5A gimbal, a forward-looking obstacle avoidance system, and powered by a 4300 mAh lithium polymer battery giving it a flight time of between 22 and 30 minutes. Announced in January 2018.
Evo II series
Retroactively known as the Evo II V1 series. Produced in the following models:

- Evo II, company designation Model MDCS. Improved model with an 8K 48MP 1/2" CMOS camera, 8GB of internal data storage, an omnidirectional obstacle avoidance system with 12 sensors, and a 7100 mAh battery giving it a flight time of 40 minutes. This variant was initially branded Evo 2. Announced in January 2020.
- Evo II Pro, company designation Model MDCP. As Evo II but with a 6K 1" CMOS camera. Announced in January 2020.
- Evo II Dual, company designation Model MDCD. As Evo II but with a FLIR Boson thermal camera in addition to the 8K camera. This variant was initially branded Evo 2 Dual. Announced in January 2020.
- Evo II Dual 640T, as Evo II Dual but with continuous-shooting capabilities.
- Evo II Pro RTK, as Evo II Pro but with real-time kinematic (RTK) positioning. Announced in January 2021.
- Evo II Dual 640T RTK, as Evo II Pro but with RTK positioning. Announced in January 2021.
- Evo II Pro Enterprise, as Evo II Pro but with an ADS-B receiver, provisions for external accessories, and a flight time of 42 minutes. Announced in September 2021.
- Evo II Dual 640T Enterprise, as Evo II Dual 640T but with the upgrades of the Evo II Pro Enterprise. Announced in September 2021.

Evo II V2 series
Company designation Model MDCA. Functionally identical to the Evo II "V1" series but with a new chipset due to the 2020–2023 global chip shortage. Introduced in September 2021 and produced in the following models:

- Evo II Pro V2, as Evo II Pro but with V2 upgrades.
- Evo II Dual 640T V2, as Evo II Dual 640T but with V2 upgrades.
- Evo II Pro RTK V2, as Evo II Pro RTK but with V2 upgrades.
- Evo II Dual 640T RTK V2, as Evo II Dual 640T RTK but with V2 upgrades.
- Evo II Pro Enterprise V2, as Evo II Pro Enterprise but with V2 upgrades.
- Evo II Dual 640T Enterprise V2, as Evo II Dual 640T Enterprise but with V2 upgrades.

Evo II V3 series
More durable V2 with higher image resolution as well as improved heat dissipation and low-light performance. Announced in September 2022 an produced in the following models:

- Evo II Pro V3, as Evo II Pro V2 but with V3 upgrades.
- Evo II Dual 640T V3, as Evo II Dual 640T V2 but with improved thermal imaging performance and other V3 upgrades.
- Evo II Pro RTK V3, as Evo II Pro RTK V2 but with V3 upgrades.
- Evo II Dual 640T RTK V3, as Evo II Dual 640T RTK V2 but with improved thermal imaging performance and other V3 upgrades.
- Evo II Pro Enterprise V3, company designation Model MDCV3. As Evo II Pro Enterprise V2 but with V3 upgrades.
- Evo II Dual 640T Enterprise V3, as Evo II Dual 640T Enterprise V2 but with improved thermal imaging performance and other V3 upgrades.

=== Evo Nano ===
Evo Nano
Company designation Model MDA. Entry-level variant weighing 249 g (0.549 lb) with a 1/2" CMOS camera, a three-direction binocular obstacle avoidance system, and a 2250 mAh battery giving it a flight time of 28 minutes. Announced in September 2021.
Evo Nano+
Company designation Model MDA2. As Evo Nano but with a 1/1.28" CMOS camera. Announced in September 2021.

=== Evo Lite ===
Evo Lite
Company designation Model MDXM. Simplified variant weighing 835 g (1.841 lb) with a 1/1.28" CMOS camera and a 3930 mAh battery giving it a flight time of 40 minutes. Announced in September 2021.
Evo Lite+
Company designation Model MDXM2. As Evo Lite but with a 1" CMOS camera. Announced in September 2021.
Evo Lite 6K Enterprise
Enterprise model with a 1" CMOS camera. Released in August 2024.
Evo Lite 640T Enterprise
As Evo Lite 6K Enterprise but with a thermal camera in addition to the visible-spectrum camera. Released in August 2024.

=== Evo Max ===
Evo Max series
Produced in the following models:

- Evo Max 4T, company designation Model MDX. Enterprise variant with an IP43 protection rating, a 50MP wide-angle camera, an 8K 48MP zoom camera, a 640×512 thermal camera, and a laser rangefinder. Announced in January 2023.
- Evo Max 4N, as Evo Max 4T but with a night vision zoom camera. Announced in May 2023.
- Evo Max 4T XE, as Evo Max 4T but "FusionLight" camera system with a 48MP wide-angle camera, an 8K 48MP zoom camera, a 640×512 thermal camera, and a laser rangefinder.
- Evo Max 4T Pro

Evo Max V2 series
Produced in the following models:

- Evo Max 4T V2, improved Evo Max 4T with the camera system of the Evo Max 4T XE.
- Evo Max 4N V2, improved Evo Max 4N.
- Evo Max 4NZ V2, as Evo Max 4N V2 but with a night vision-capable wide-angle camera.

== Operators ==
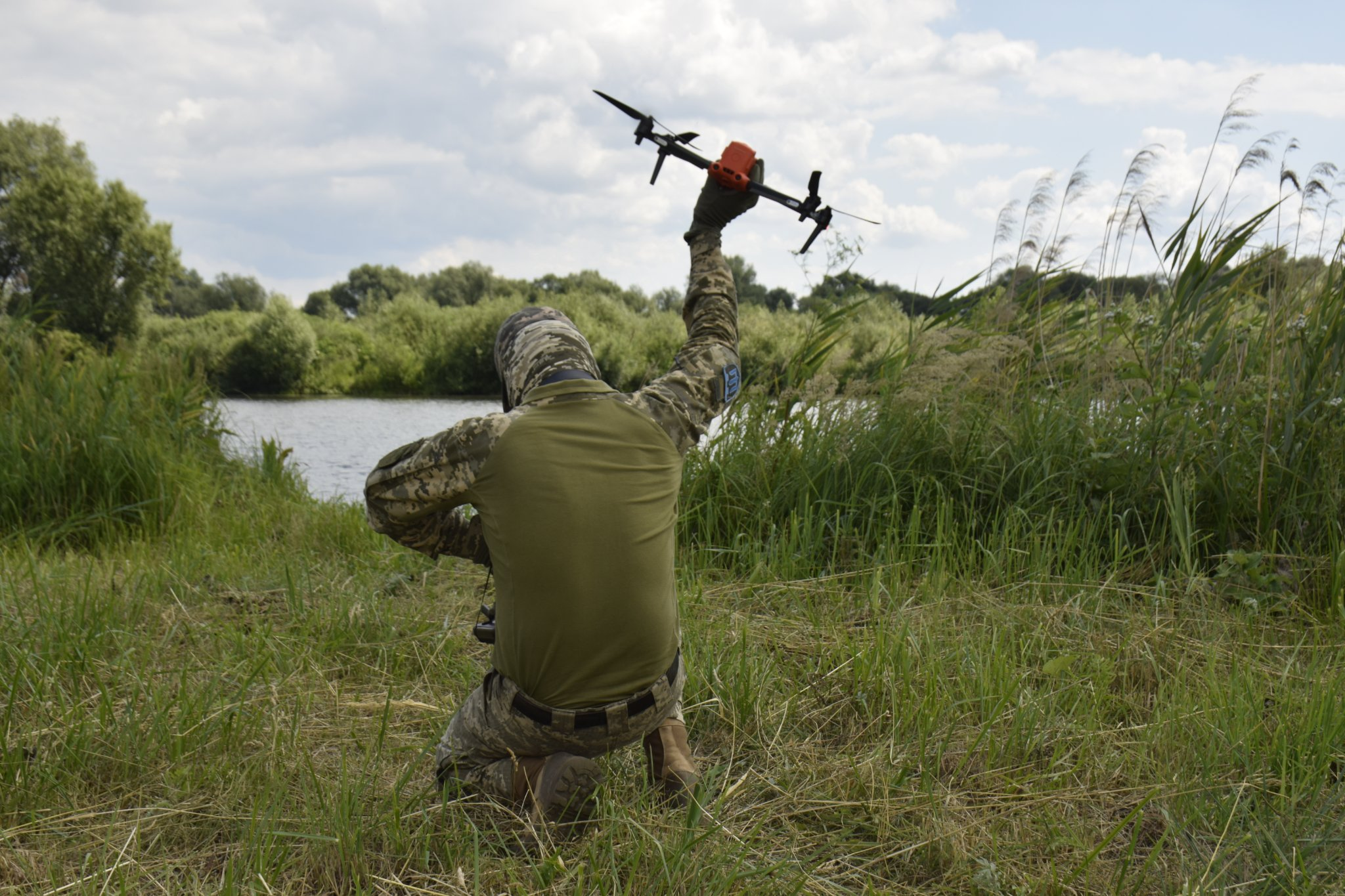
Ukrainian Ground Forces soldier with an Evo II during a training exercise in July 2022.

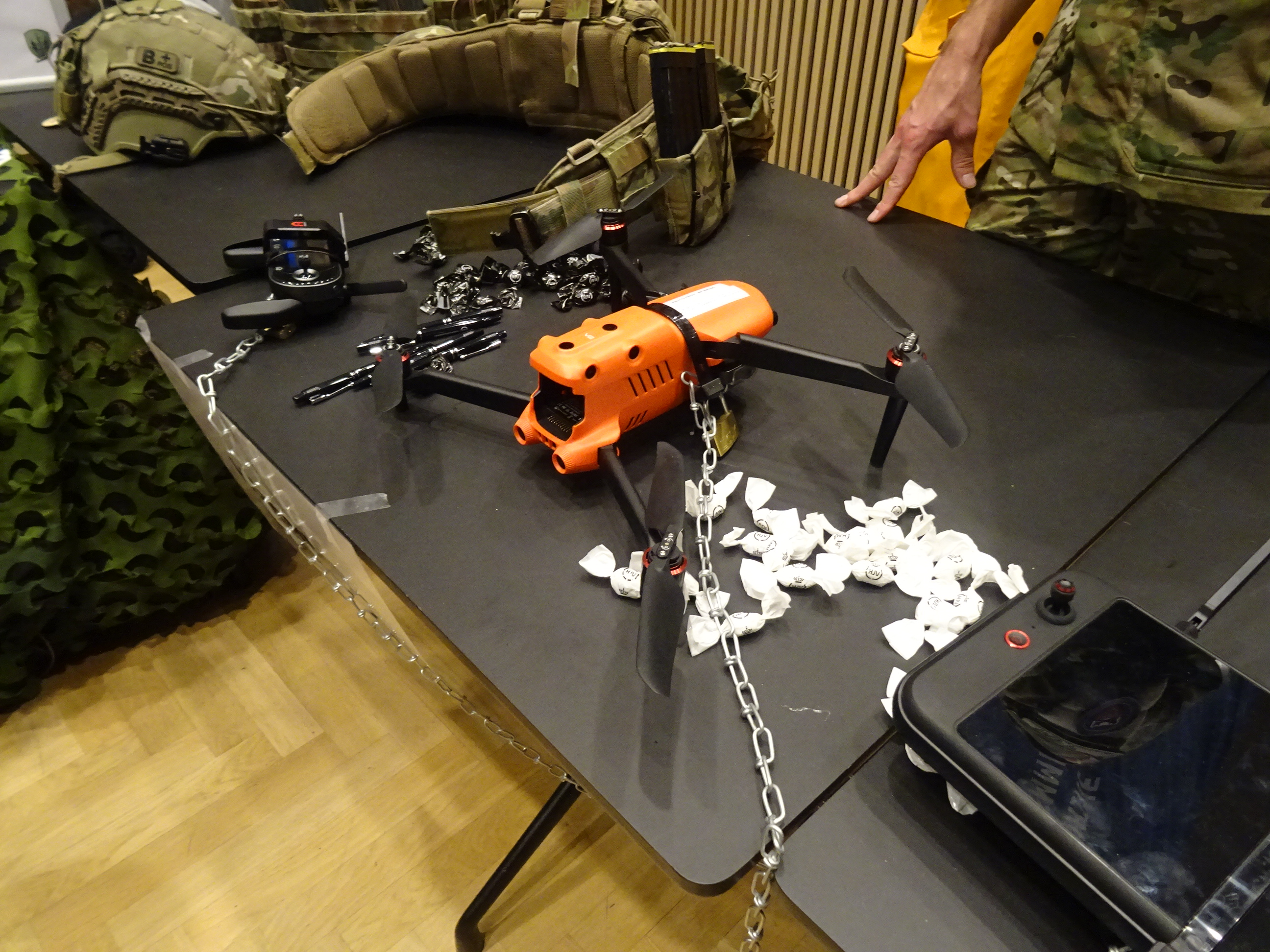
Evo II of the Danish Naval Home Guard on display during a culture night event in Copenhagen.

=== Law enforcement operators ===
United Kingdom

- The Nottinghamshire Police purchased two Evo II Dual 640T drones in 2022.

=== Military operators ===
Germany

- In December 2024, the Bundeswehr approved a framework to acquire two commercial drones for the military; the Evo Max 4T and the DJI Matrice 30.

Ukraine

- Aerorozvidka acquired four Evo II Enterprise drones for use against the invading Russian forces in April 2022. These drones were donated by the Czech Post Bellum organization.

== Specifications (Evo II Pro V3) ==
Data from Autel Robotics

General characteristics

- Length: 0.457 m (1 ft 6 in) (0.230 m (9.1 in) folded)
- Width: 0.558 m (1 ft 10 in) (0.130 m (5.1 in) folded)
- Height: 0.108 m (4 in)
- Empty weight: 1.191 kg (3 lb)
- Max takeoff weight: 1.270 kg (3 lb)
- Battery: 11.55V 7100 mAh (82Wh) lithium polymer battery

Performance

- Maximum speed: 12.4274 km/h (7.7220 mph, 6.7103 kn) near sea level
- Range: 25 km (16 mi, 13 nmi)
- Endurance: 39 minutes
- Service ceiling: 5,000 m (16,000 ft) above sea level
- Rate of climb: 8 m/s (1,600 ft/min)

Avionics

- Camera: 20MP 1" CMOS
- GNSS compatibility:

- GPS
- Galileo
- BeiDou
- GLONASS

== See also ==
Aircraft of comparable role, configuration, and era

- DJI Air
- DJI Matrice
- DJI Mavic
- DJI Mini
- GoPro Karma
- Parrot Anafi
- Skydio 2
- Skydio X2
