= GoPro Karma =

American camera drone

Karma
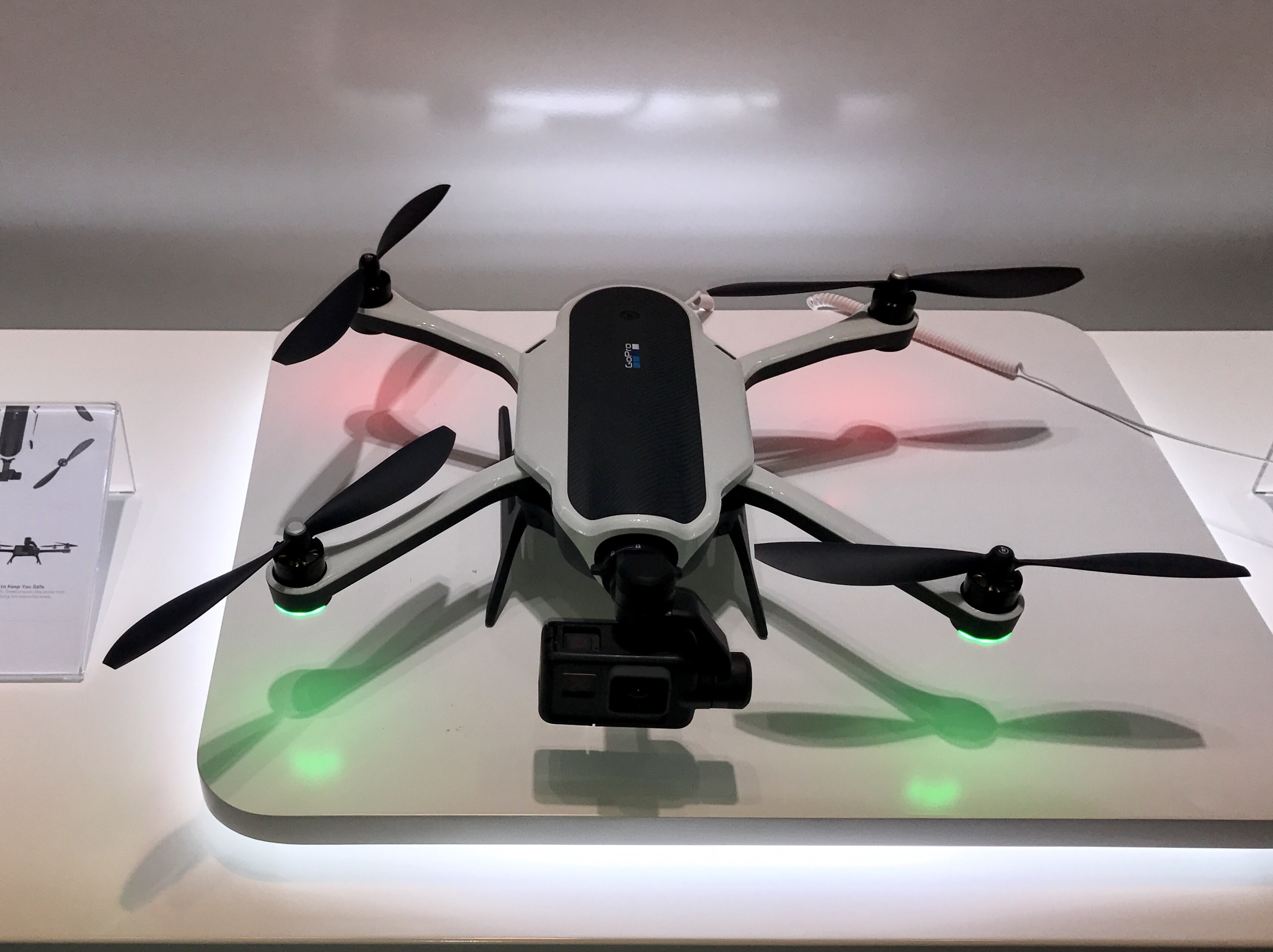
- GoPro Karma

General information
- Type: Unmanned aerial vehicle
- National origin: United States
- Manufacturer: GoPro
- Status: Discontinued

History
- Manufactured: 2016–2018
- Introduction date: September 2016

The GoPro Karma is a compact quadcopter drone for personal and commercial aerial photography and videography use, released in 2016 by the American technology company GoPro. The Karma competed with the Chinese DJI Mavic series, but suffered from multiple issues and was discontinued less than two years after its initial launch due to poor sales.

== Design and development ==
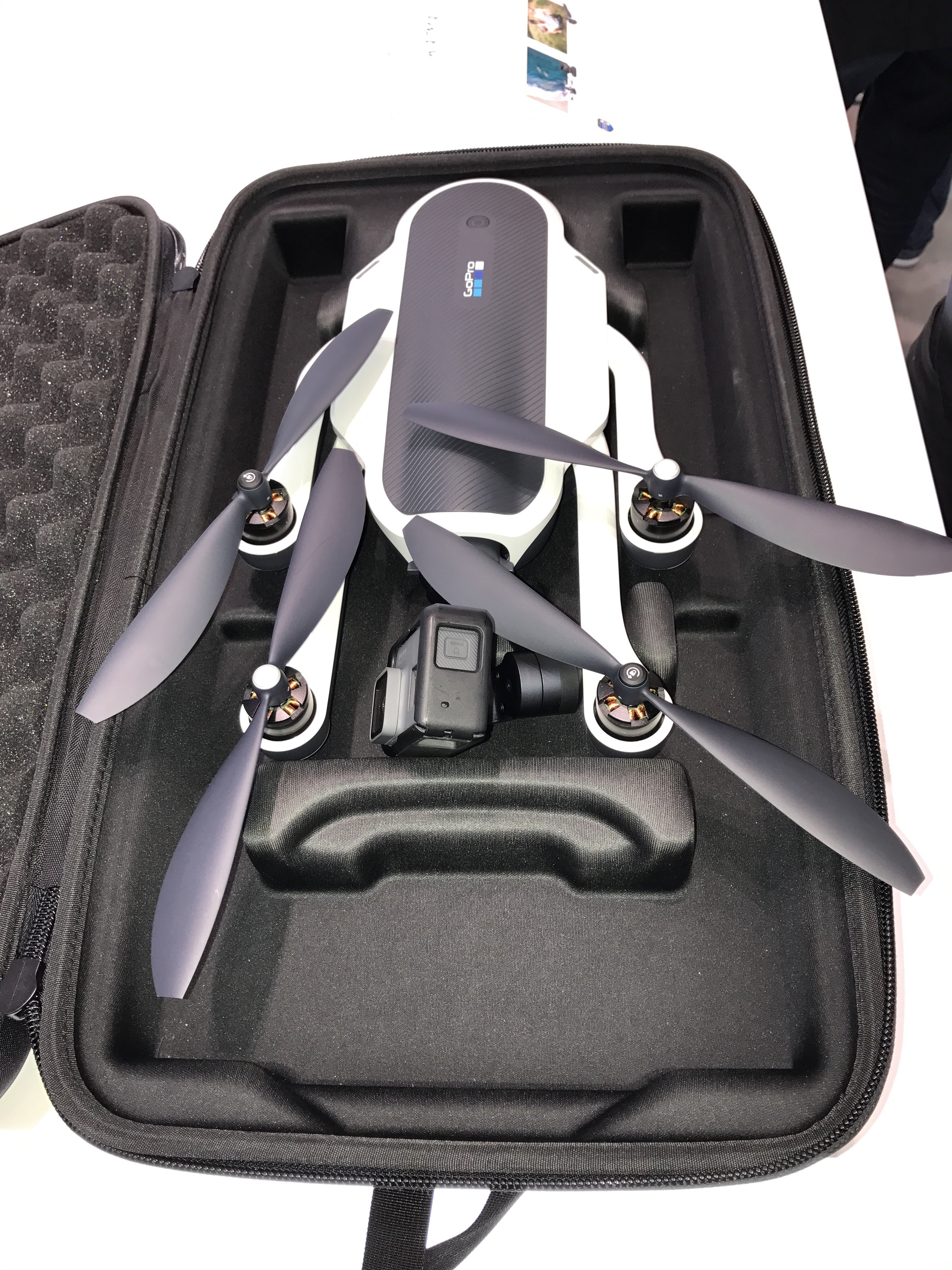
Folded GoPro Karma in a carrying backpack

GoPro first attempted to enter the drone market in February 2013 after Chinese drone manufacturer DJI released their GoPro-compatible Phantom quadcopter. DJI CEO Frank Wang had approached GoPro CEO Nick Woodman about partnering to create a new drone, but talks fell through when Woodman wanted the new drone to be branded as a GoPro product. GoPro later approached 3D Robotics to create a drone specifically designed for the GoPro HERO camera, which was released in 2015 as the 3D Robotics Solo. Despite the partnership, GoPro proceeded to develop its own drone, which was officially announced in May 2015 as the Karma. The Karma, which was reported to have had a rushed development, was originally supposed to release in June 2016. In May 2016, GoPro pushed back the release of the Karma to late 2016.

GoPro released the Karma alongside its HERO5 camera in September 2016. Like the competing DJI Mavic Pro, which was released a week later, the Karma is a quadcopter with folding arms for increased portability, though when unfolded it is about twice the size and weight of its competitor. Unlike the Mavic, the Karma's 3-axis camera gimbal can be detached and mounted onto a handheld "Karma Grip". The gimbal is compatible with several GoPro cameras, including the HERO4 Silver, HERO4 Black, HERO5 Black, and HERO5 Session. The Karma was noted to have inferior flight performance compared to the Mavic Pro, being 5 mph (8.0 km/h) slower and having half the range of its competitor in addition to its shorter flight time of 18 minutes (Note: Although GoPro advertised the Karma as having a flight time of 20 minutes, flight testing showed a maximum flight time of about 18 or 19 minutes. Flight time was also noted to decrease by about 6–7 minutes when recording a 3–4 minute video.) compared to the 27 minutes of the Mavic. The Karma also lacks obstacle avoidance and downward-facing sensors. However, the Karma was also noted to be easier to use than the Mavic Pro, especially for beginners.

=== Issues and discontinuation ===
As early as six days after its initial launch, users reported that the Karma's motors were cutting off mid-flight, causing the drones to fall from the sky. As a result, GoPro recalled all 2,500 sold Karma drones and temporarily ceased shipments of further drones in November 2016, only a few weeks after the first crash reports. In January 2017, Woodman revealed that the crashes were caused by the battery becoming decoupled from the connector. The front-heavy placement of the Karma's camera gimbal was speculated to have contributed to the crashes, as the imbalanced design caused vibrations during flight which could have shaken the battery loose. The recall led to about 15% of GoPro employees being laid off. In addition to the battery issue, the Karma was also found to suffer from poor stabilization, in-flight drift, camera horizon tilt, and high battery drain.

Shipments of the Karma resumed in February 2017 after a redesign of the faulty battery latch. However, GoPro struggled to make a profit on the drone, and in January 2018 the company announced that it would discontinue the Karma and leave the drone market after its final inventory was sold. In January 2020, two years after its discontinuation, remaining Karma drones were temporarily grounded by a GPS-related glitch which prevented the drone from starting. GoPro later attributed the issue to a problem with the World Magnetic Model data and released firmware version 2.50.01 on January 13, 2020, to address the compass calibration problem.

As of 2024, GoPro has not released any new drones since the discontinuation of the Karma.

== Accidents and incidents ==
A GoPro Karma quadcopter hit a seat at Petco Park in San Diego, California, narrowly missing fans during a match between the San Diego Padres and the Arizona Diamondbacks in May 2017. Major League Baseball subsequently stated that UAVs are not allowed at baseball grounds.

== Specifications (Karma) ==
Video captured by a GoPro Karma in Marlboro, Vermont.

Data from

General characteristics

- Empty weight: 1.375 lb (0.625 kg)

Performance

- Maximum speed: 35 mph (54 km/h, 30 kn)
- Range: 0.621 mi (1.0 km, 0.540 nmi)
- Endurance: 18–20 minutes
- Service ceiling: 14,500 ft (4,500 m) above sea level
- Maximum wind resistance: 22 mph (36 km/h)

Avionics

- Camera: GoPro HERO5 Black

== See also ==
Aircraft of comparable role, configuration, and era

- Autel Evo
- DJI Air
- DJI Mavic
- DJI Spark
- Parrot Bebop
- Skydio X2
