= DJI Mini =

Series of teleoperated compact quadcopter drone models

Mini
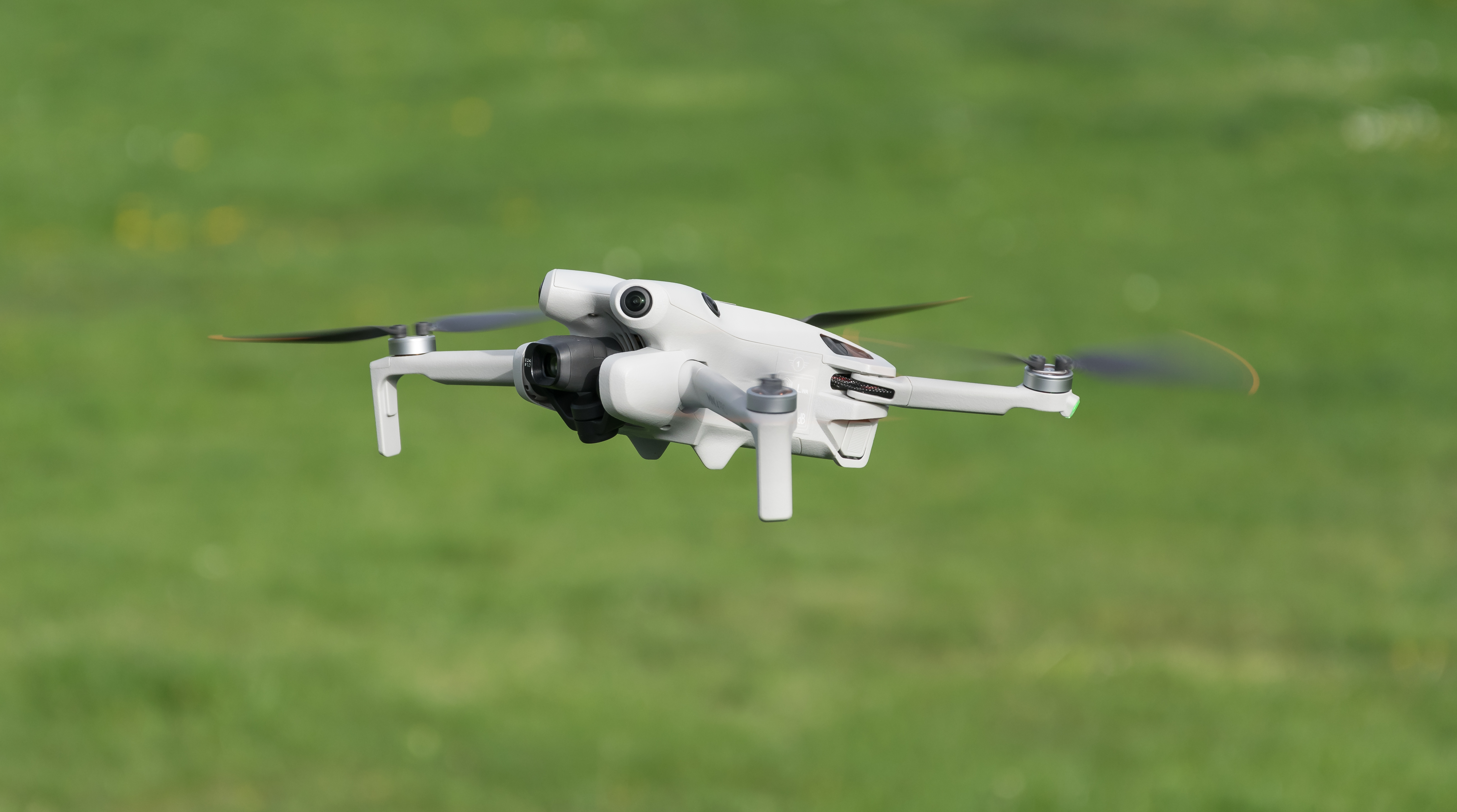
- DJI Mini 4 Pro

General information
- Type: Unmanned aerial vehicle
- National origin: China
- Manufacturer: DJI; Cogito Tech
- Status: In production

History
- Manufactured: 2019–present
- Introduction date: November 2019
- Developed from: DJI Mavic

The DJI Mini, originally marketed as the DJI Mavic Mini, is a series of teleoperated compact quadcopter drones for personal and commercial aerial photography and videography use, released by the Chinese technology company DJI. The Mini is a miniaturized version of the DJI Mavic designed to bypass drone registration requirements in most countries, with all variants weighing under 250 grams (0.55 lb) in normal configuration. A licensed version is produced in Malaysia by Cogito Tech as the Specta Mini.

== Design and development ==
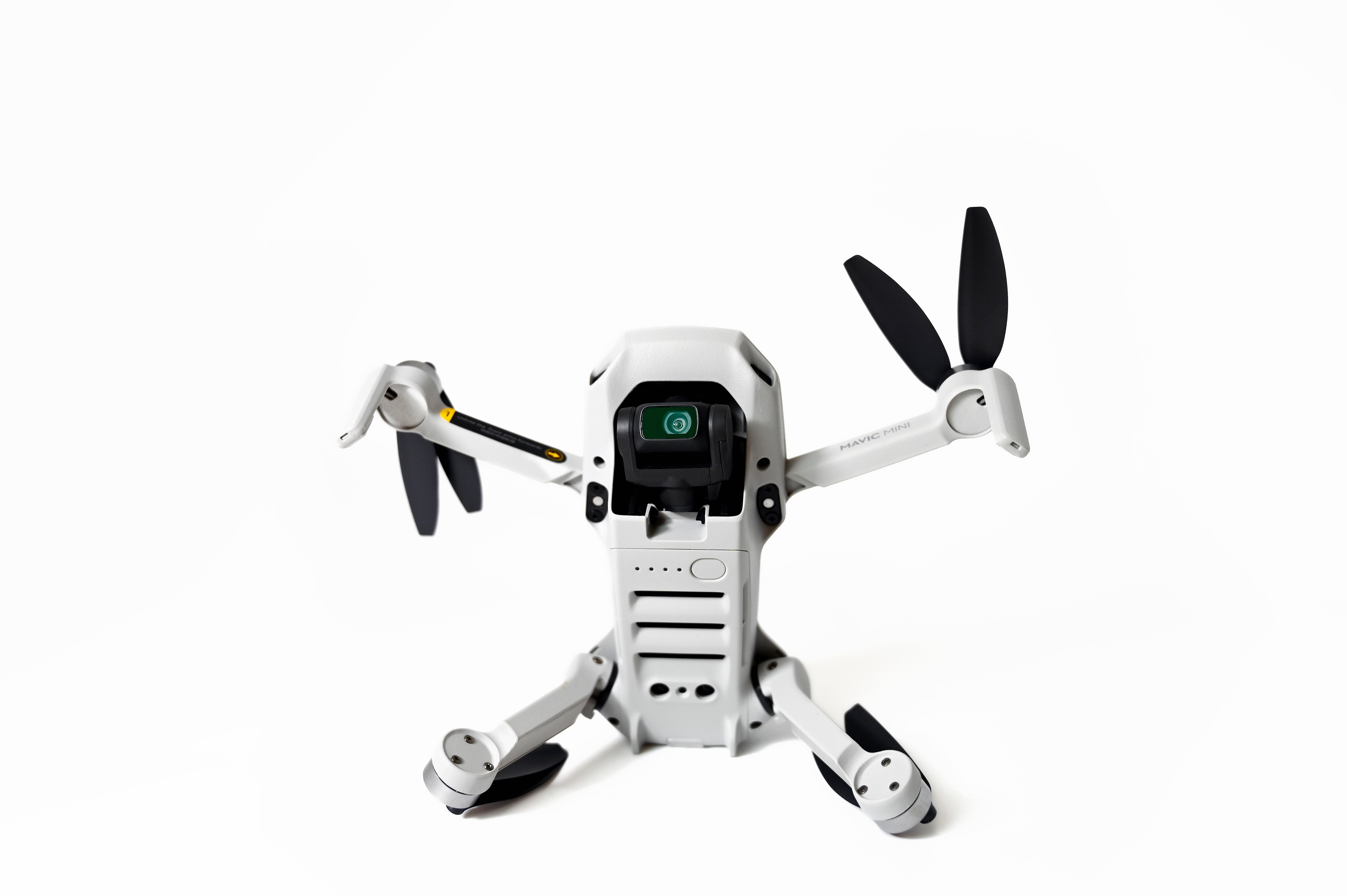
Partially unfolded Mavic Mini

DJI announced the Mavic Mini on 30 October 2019 as a replacement for the DJI Spark as DJI's beginner camera drone, with sales commencing on 11 November. A miniaturized derivative of the DJI Mavic, the Mavic Mini was designed to bypass drone registration requirements in most countries, with the "general version" weighing only 249 g (0.549 lb). It has a 12MP 1/2.3" CMOS camera capable of 2.7K video at 30 FPS and a battery capacity of 2400 mAh, giving the drone a maximum flight time of 30 minutes. To minimize weight, the Mavic Mini does not include an obstacle avoidance system, though it does include geofencing technology and AeroScope Remote ID. A "JP version" was also built for the Japanese market, where drones weighing at least 200 g (7.1 oz) must be registered, with a lighter 1100 mAh battery reducing the total weight to 199 g (0.439 lb) and flight time to 18 minutes. The Mavic Mini uses an Enhanced Wi-Fi transmission system, giving it a range of 4 km (2.5 mi).

The Mini SE (the Mavic branding was dropped with the Mini 2) was released mid-2021, being basically the original Mavic Mini built in the Mini 2 shell. Compared to the Mavic Mini, the Mini SE has improved wind resistance and a smaller battery capacity of 2250 mAh, but still has a maximum flight time of 30 minutes. The Mini SE retains the 12MP 1/2.3" CMOS camera and Enhanced Wi-Fi transmission system of the Mavic Mini.

=== Mini 2 series ===
The successor to the Mavic Mini was released November 2020 as the Mini 2, dropping the Mavic name. Compared to the Mavic Mini, the Mini 2 has a reduced battery capacity of 2250 mAh, though flight time was slightly increased to 31 minutes. The camera was improved with the ability to record 4K footage, and wind resistance was increased to 24 mph (39 km/h); up from the Mavic Mini's 18 mph (29 km/h). The Enhanced Wi-Fi transmission system of the Mavic Mini was replaced with OcuSync 2.0, giving it a max transmission range of 10 km.

DJI released the Mini 2 SE in February 2023 as a successor to the Mini SE. The Mini 2 SE differs from the Mini 2 in that it has a maximum resolution of 2.7K, and is slightly lighter at 246 g (0.542 lb). Although it did not initially support Remote ID, a firmware update in June 2024 added support after several countries began to require it.

The Mini 4K was announced in April 2024. It is nearly identical to the Mini 2 SE, differing in that it re-added the 4K camera.

=== Mini 3 series ===
DJI Mini 3 Pro

The DJI Mini 3 Pro was made available on 10 May 2022. Unlike previous Mini variants, the Mini 3 Pro has a full 3-axis obstacle avoidance system. The Mini 3 Pro features a new 48MP 1/1.3" CMOS camera capable of capturing 4K video at up to 60FPS and is equipped with an with O3 transmission system, allowing transmission of live 1080p video at 30 frames per second (FPS). The standard Intelligent Flight Battery has a capacity of 2453 mAh, giving the drone a maximum flight time of 34 minutes. Alternatively, the drone could be fitted with a 3850 mAh Intelligent Flight Battery Plus, increasing flight time to 47 minutes at the cost of exceeding the 250 g (0.55 lb) weight limit for unregistered drones.

On 9 December 2022, DJI released the Mini 3 as a cheaper version of the Mini 3 Pro. The primary differences between the Mini 3 and Mini 3 Pro include the removal of the obstacle avoidance sensors and limited intelligent camera modes. The transmission system was also downgraded to OcuSync 2.0 instead of the O3 used in the DJI Mini 3 Pro. Total weight was slightly reduced to 248 g (0.547 lb) with the Intelligent Flight Battery, while maximum flight time was increased to 38 minutes (51 minutes with Intelligent Flight Battery Plus).

=== Mini 4 series ===
The Mini 4 Pro was released on 25 September 2023. The Mini 4 Pro introduced the Omnidirectional Vision Sensing collision avoidance system, which uses four fisheye and two downward binocular vision sensors and a time-of-flight sensor. The drone also features an O4 transmission system transmitting 1080p footage up to 20 km away. The Mini 4 Pro's camera is an improved version of the one found on the Mini 3 Pro, with the added capability to capture slow motion 4K video at 100FPS. The gimbal can also rotate 90 degrees to shoot vertical video.

=== Mini 5 series ===
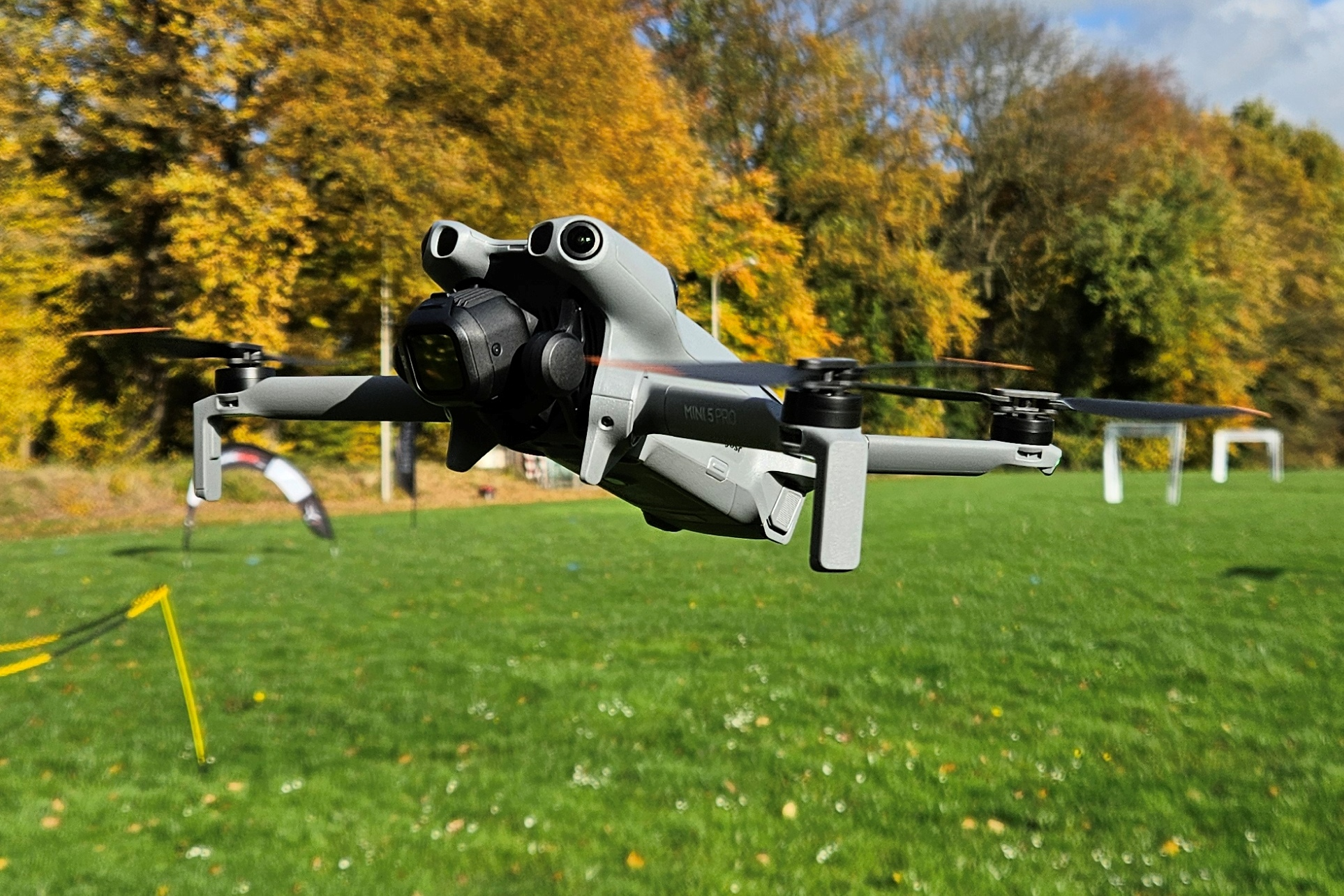
DJI Mini 5 Pro

The Mini 5 Pro was launched on 17 September 2025, though it was not made available in the United States. The Mini 5 Pro uses Model 6028F propellers and features a 50MP 1-inch camera sensor; being the first mini camera drone with such a camera. The drone has a flight time of 36 minutes with the standard Intelligent Flight Battery or 52 minutes with the Intelligent Flight Battery Plus. According to DJI, the Mini 5 Pro with a standard Intelligent Flight Battery has a weight of 249.9 g (0.551 lb) with a ±4 g (0.0088 lb) margin of error, placing some drones over the 250 g (0.55 lb) weight limit for unregistered drones in many countries. Due to this issue, DJI provided a disclaimer on its website warning users to weigh their drones before flying without a registration.

=== Licensed version ===
Hong Kong-based Cogito Tech produces a licensed version of the Mini 2 SE as the Specta Mini. Though Cogito denied any connection to DJI, The Hill reported the Specta Mini and Specta Air (the company's version of the DJI Air 3) are virtually identical to their Chinese counterparts, including performance and software, and likely use DJI's proprietary OcuSync video transmission system. Despite this, the Specta Mini is not a carbon copy of the Mini 2 SE as it has a 4K camera.

== Variants ==
=== Mavic Mini ===
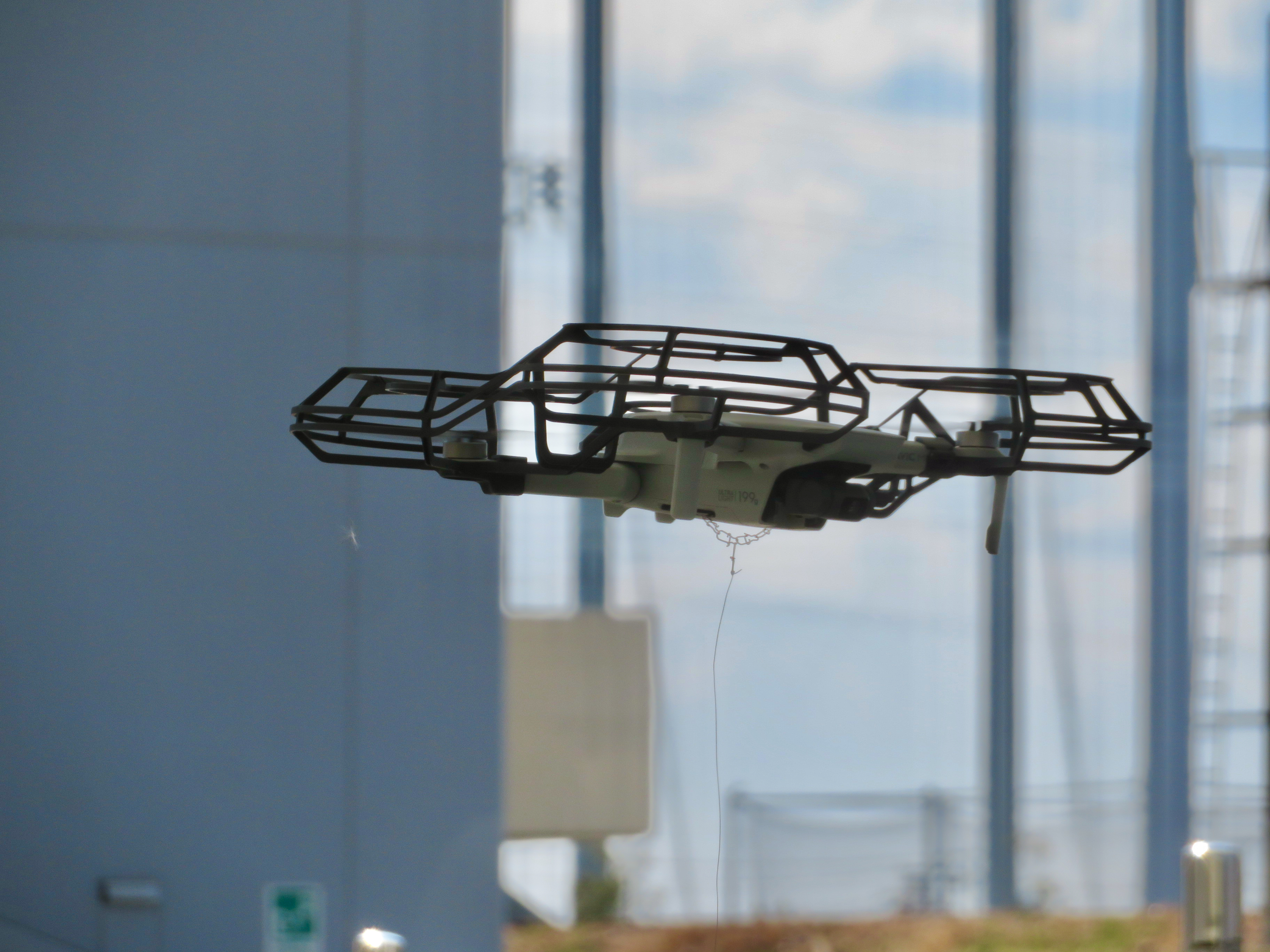
"JP version" of the Mavic Mini with propeller guards installed. This variant is marked with "199g" on the side, indicating its lighter weight than the model sold in the rest of the world.

Mavic Mini
Company designation Model MT1SS5 and MT1SD25. Miniaturized Mavic with a 12MP 1/2.3" CMOS camera, Enhanced Wi-Fi transmission system, and a 2400 mAh battery giving it 30 minutes of flight time. The MT1SS5 is controlled exclusively on the 5.8 GHz radio band, while the MT1SD25 can be controlled on either the 5.8 GHz or 2.4 GHz bands. Introduced in November 2019.
Mavic Mini (JP version)
Version for the Japanese market with a 1100 mAh battery giving it 18 minutes of flight time and reducing total weight by 50 g (0.11 lb).
Mini SE
Company designation Model MT2SS5. Budget model with Mavic Mini internals in a Mini 2 shell, improved wind resistance, and a 2250 mAh battery giving it 30 minutes of flight time. Introduced in mid-2021.

=== Mini 2 ===
Mini 2
Company designation Model MT2WD. Improved Mavic Mini with a 4K camera, improved wind resistance, OcuSync 2.0 transmission system, and a 2250 mAh battery giving it 31 minutes of flight time. Introduced in November 2020.
Mini 2 SE
Company designation Model MT2SD. Budget model with a 2.7K camera and a slightly reduced total weight. Introduced in February 2023.

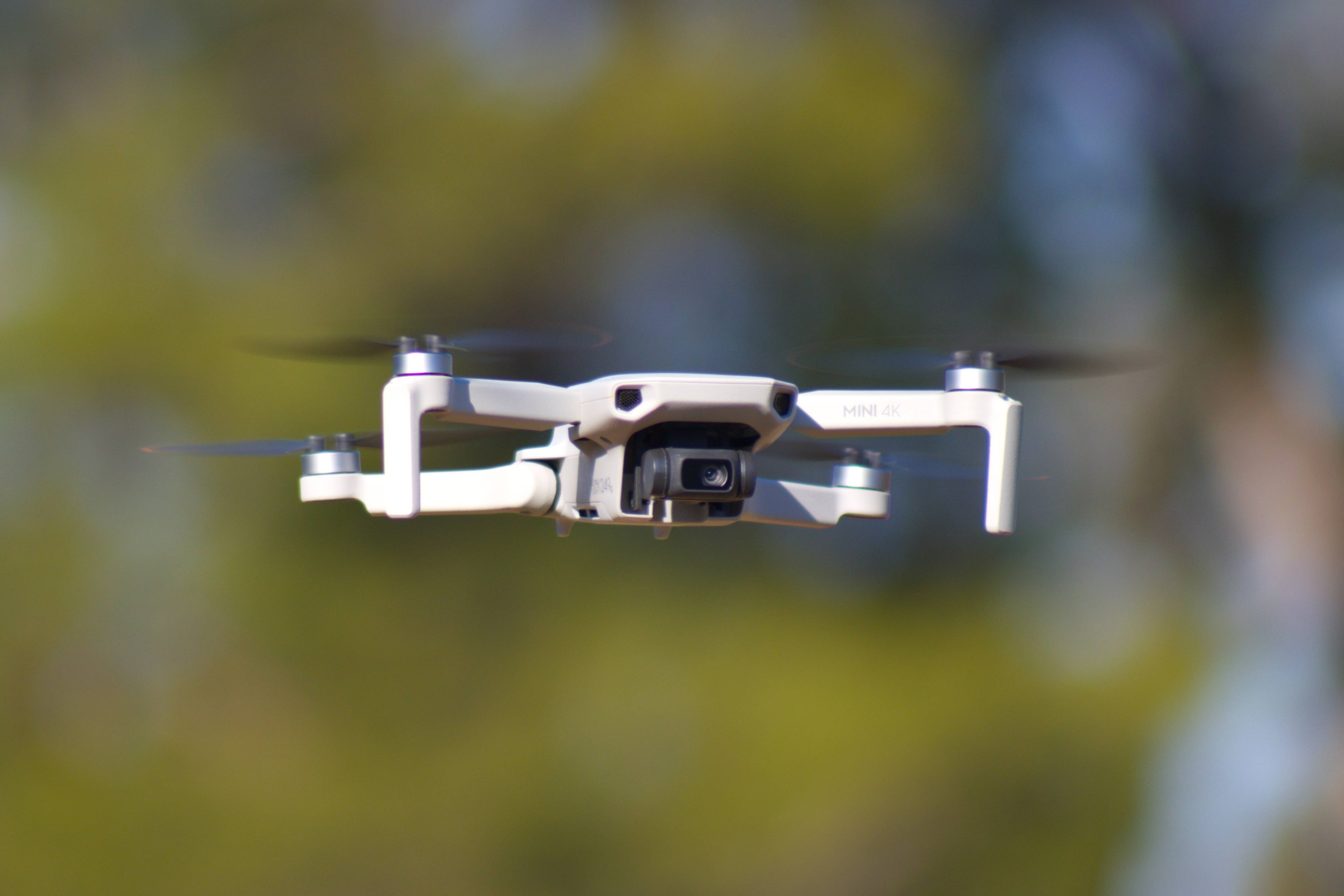
DJI Mini 4K

Mini 4K
Company designation Model MT2PD. As Mini 2 SE but with a 4K camera. Introduced in April 2024.
Specta Mini
Company designation Model TQFDUB1. Licensed derivative of the Mini 2 SE built in Malaysia by Cogito Tech with a 4K camera.

=== Mini 3 ===
Mini 3 Pro
Company designations Model MT3M3VD, MT3M3VDB, and MT3M3VZ. Improved Mini 2 with a 48MP 1/1.3" CMOS camera, O3 transmission system, 3-axis obstacle avoidance, and a 2453 mAh battery giving it 34 minutes of flight time. An optional 3850 mAh battery increases flight time to 47 minutes, but increases total weight by about 40 g (0.088 lb). Introduced in May 2022. The Mini 3 Pro was assigned three different model numbers for certification and sales purposes, with the three models being identical.
Mini 3
Company designation Model MT3PD. Downgraded Mini 3 Pro with obstacle avoidance sensors removed and an OcuSync 2.0 transmission system. Flight time was increased to 38 minutes with a 2453 mAh battery or 51 minutes with an optional 3850 mAh battery. Introduced in December 2022.

=== Mini 4 ===
Mini 4 Pro
Company designation Model MT4MFVD. Improved Mini 3 Pro with an Omnidirectional Vision Sensing collision avoidance system, O4 transmission system, 4K slow motion capabilities, and a 2590 mAh battery giving it a flight time of 34 minutes. An optional 3850 mAh battery increases flight time to 45 minutes, but increases total weight by about 40 g (0.088 lb). Introduced in September 2023.

=== Mini 5 ===
Mini 5 Pro
Company designation Model MT5MFND. Improved variant with a 50MP 1-inch camera sensor, an O4+ transmission system, Model 6028F propellers, and a slightly increased weight of 249.9 ± 4 g (0.5509 ± 0.0088 lb). Maximum flight time was increased to 36 minutes with the standard Intelligent Flight Battery or 52 minutes with the Intelligent Flight Battery Plus. Introduced September 2025.

== Accidents and incidents ==
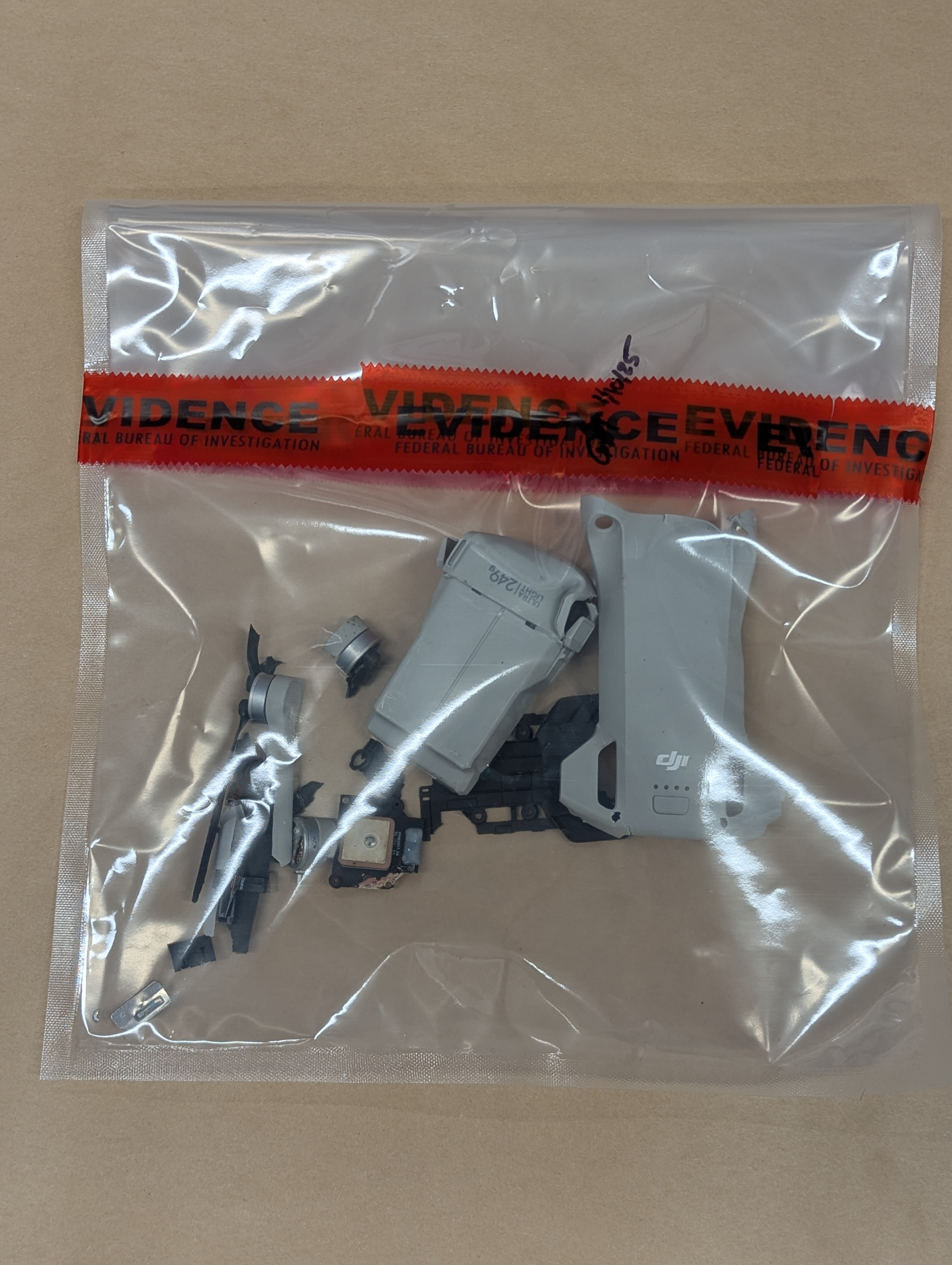
Wreckage of the Mini 3 involved in the January 2025 mid-air collision.

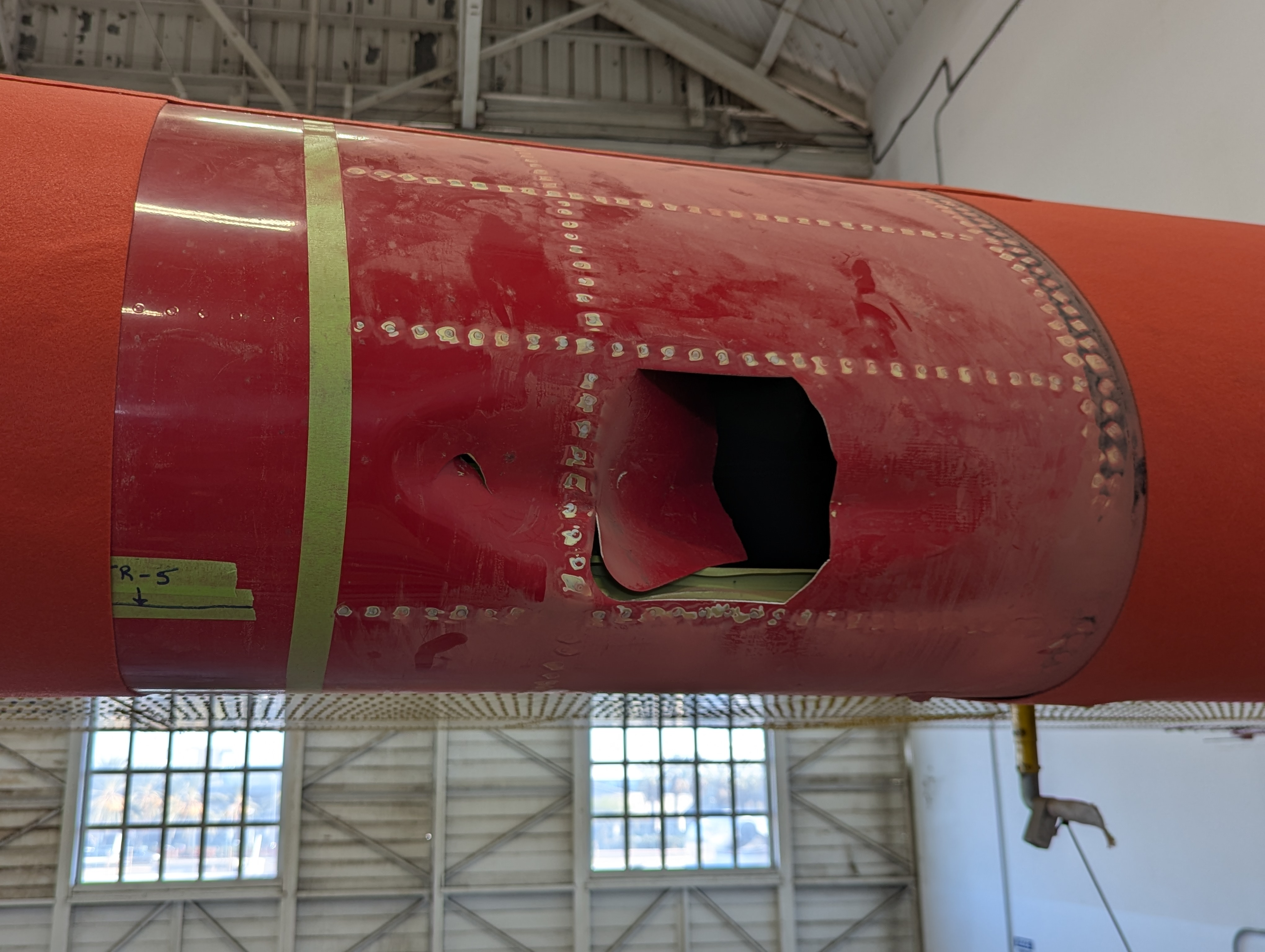
Hole created by the Mini 3 in the wing of the CL-415.

On 9 January 2025, a DJI Mini 3 collided with a Canadair CL-415 that was fighting the wildfires in Southern California. The collision created a hole in the left wing of the CL-415, forcing the aircraft to be grounded for repairs. The drone was violating a temporary flight restriction (TFR) put in place to protect firefighting aircraft. According to Los Angeles County Fire Department chief Anthony Marrone, the Federal Bureau of Investigation planned to deploy "aerial armor" to prevent drones from entering the restricted airspace.

== Specifications (Mini 4 Pro) ==
Data from DJI Mini 4 Pro user manual

General characteristics

- Length: 0.298 m (1 ft 0 in) (0.148 m (5.8 in) folded)
- Width: 0.373 m (1 ft 3 in) (0.094 m (3.7 in) folded)
- Height: 0.101 m (4 in) (0.064 m (2.5 in) folded)
- Empty weight: 0.249 kg (1 lb) (≈290 g (0.64 lb) with Intelligent Flight Battery Plus)
- Battery capacity:

- Intelligent Flight Battery: 2590 mAh
- Intelligent Flight Battery Plus: 3850 mAh

Performance

- Maximum speed: 57.6 km/h (35.8 mph, 31.1 kn) at sea level
- Range: 18 km (11 mi, 9.7 nmi) (≈25 km (16 mi) with Intelligent Flight Battery Plus)
- Endurance: 34 minutes (45 minutes with Intelligent Flight Battery Plus)
- Rate of climb: 5 m/s (980 ft/min)

Avionics

- Camera: 48MP 1/1.3" CMOS
- GNSS compatibility:

- GPS
- Galileo
- BeiDou

- Transmission system: O4

== See also ==
Related development

- DJI Mavic
- DJI Air

Aircraft of comparable role, configuration, and era

- Antigravity A1
- Autel Evo
- DJI Phantom
- DJI Spark
