= Teleoperation =

Operation of a system or machine at a distance

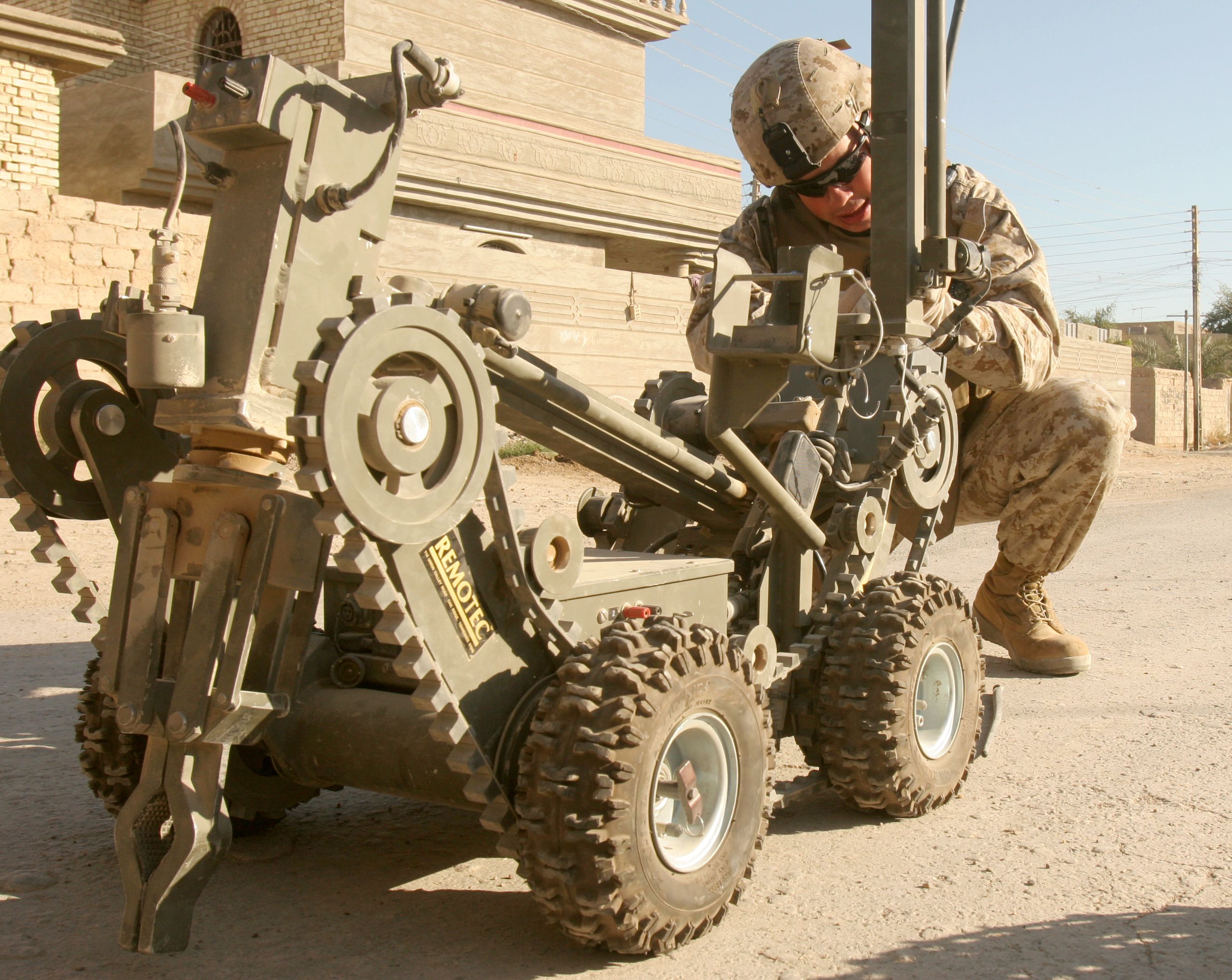
An IED detonator, a telemanipulator for investigating potentially explosive devices

Teleoperation (or remote operation) is the operation of a system or machine at a distance, e.g. with a remote control device or program. It is most commonly associated with robotics and mobile robots, but can be applied to a range of other circumstances.

== History ==
The 19th century saw many inventors working on remotely operated weapons (torpedoes) including prototypes built by John Louis Lay (1872), John Ericsson (1873), Victor von Scheliha (1873), and the first practical wire guided torpedo, the Brennan torpedo, patented by Louis Brennan in 1877. In 1898, Nikola Tesla demonstrated a remotely controlled boat with a patented wireless radio guidance system that he tried to market to the United States military, but was turned down.

Teleoperation is now moving into the hobby industry with first-person view (FPV) equipment. FPV equipment mounted on hobby cars, planes and helicopters give a TV-style transmission back to the operator, extending the range of the vehicle to greater than line-of-sight range.

== Examples ==
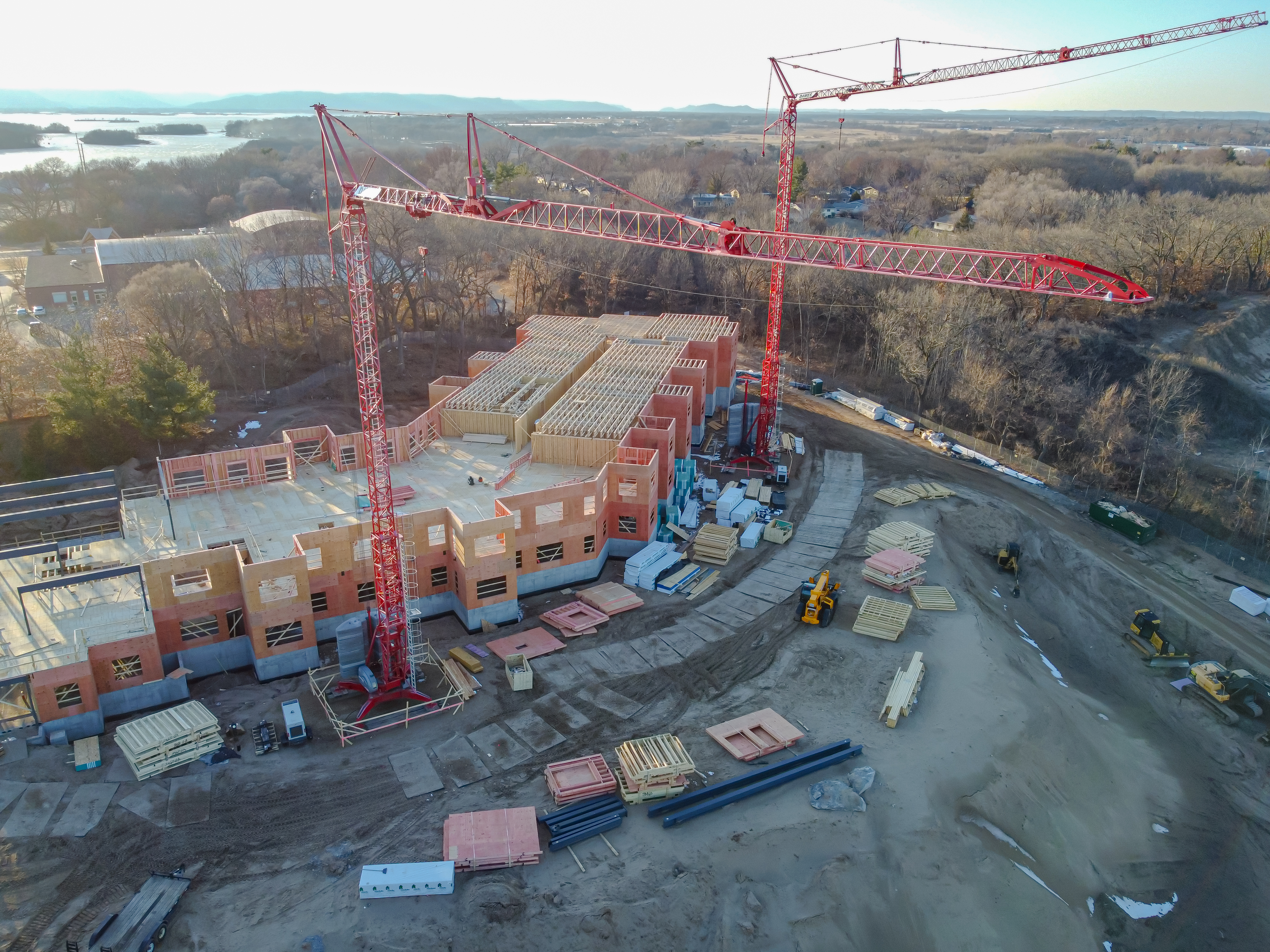
Teleoperated tower cranes

There are several particular types of systems that are often controlled remotely:

- Entertainment systems (i.e. televisions, VCRs, DVD players etc.) are often controlled remotely via a remote control.
- Industrial machinery is often operated remotely, particularly in hazardous environments. Examples include the construction of the Object Shelter or sarcophagus at Chernobyl after the Chernobyl accident, and removal of debris after hazardous rock slides.
- Remotely operated vehicles (ROVs) are extensively used in hazardous environments (i.e. radioactive environments, contaminated environments, minefields, deep oceans).
- Remote surgery
- Unmanned aerial vehicles, also known as drones

== Teleoperation of autonomous vehicles ==
Teleoperation of autonomous vehicles is the ability to remotely drive or assist a self-driving car.

Most leading companies in the industry believe that to bridge the gap between current self-driving capabilities and the requirements needed for widespread adoption of autonomous vehicles, there is a need to have teleoperation capabilities for assisting self-driving cars, in situations of 'edge cases' – where the autonomous vehicle software stack has low confidence level in its ability to perform the correct action, or when the vehicle needs to operate outside of its standard operating parameters. Without remote assistance, in such situations the self-driving car would transition to a minimum risk maneuverer which is usually to stop.

Many AV companies plan on using teleoperations as part of their rollout for self driving cars. Examples of companies that have stated they will deploy, or currently deploying teleoperations solutions include Voyage.auto, Denso, Waymo, GM Cruise, Aptiv, Zoox.

Teleoperation of autonomous vehicles includes privately owned self driving car use cases, such as self parking assistants, shared mobility use cases, e.g. in robotaxis and autonomous shuttles and industrial use cases, for example autonomous forklifts.

There are two main modes for teleoperation of autonomous vehicles. The first is remote driving, also called "direct driving", wherein the remote operator performs the dynamic drive task, i.e. drives the car remotely, controlling the car's steering, acceleration and braking systems. In the second mode, remote assistance, also called "high level commands", remote operators supervise the vehicle and provide instructions, approve or correct the vehicle path, without actually performing the dynamic driving task. Some companies deploy a combination of both concepts, depending on the use case. Examples of companies that provide solutions in the field of teleoperations are DriveU.auto, Roboauto, Pylot (now part of Fernride), Ottopia, Designated Driver, Soliton Systems, and Transitive Robotics.

== See also ==
- ArduPilot – Open-source autopiloting library
- Human–machine system
- Remote-control vehicle
- Remote administration
- Remote manipulator
- Telecommand
- Telepresence – Technologies allowing a person to feel they are present in another place
- Telerobotics
