= DJI =

Chinese technology company

SZ DJI Technology Co., Ltd.
- Logo, stands for Da-Jiang Innovations

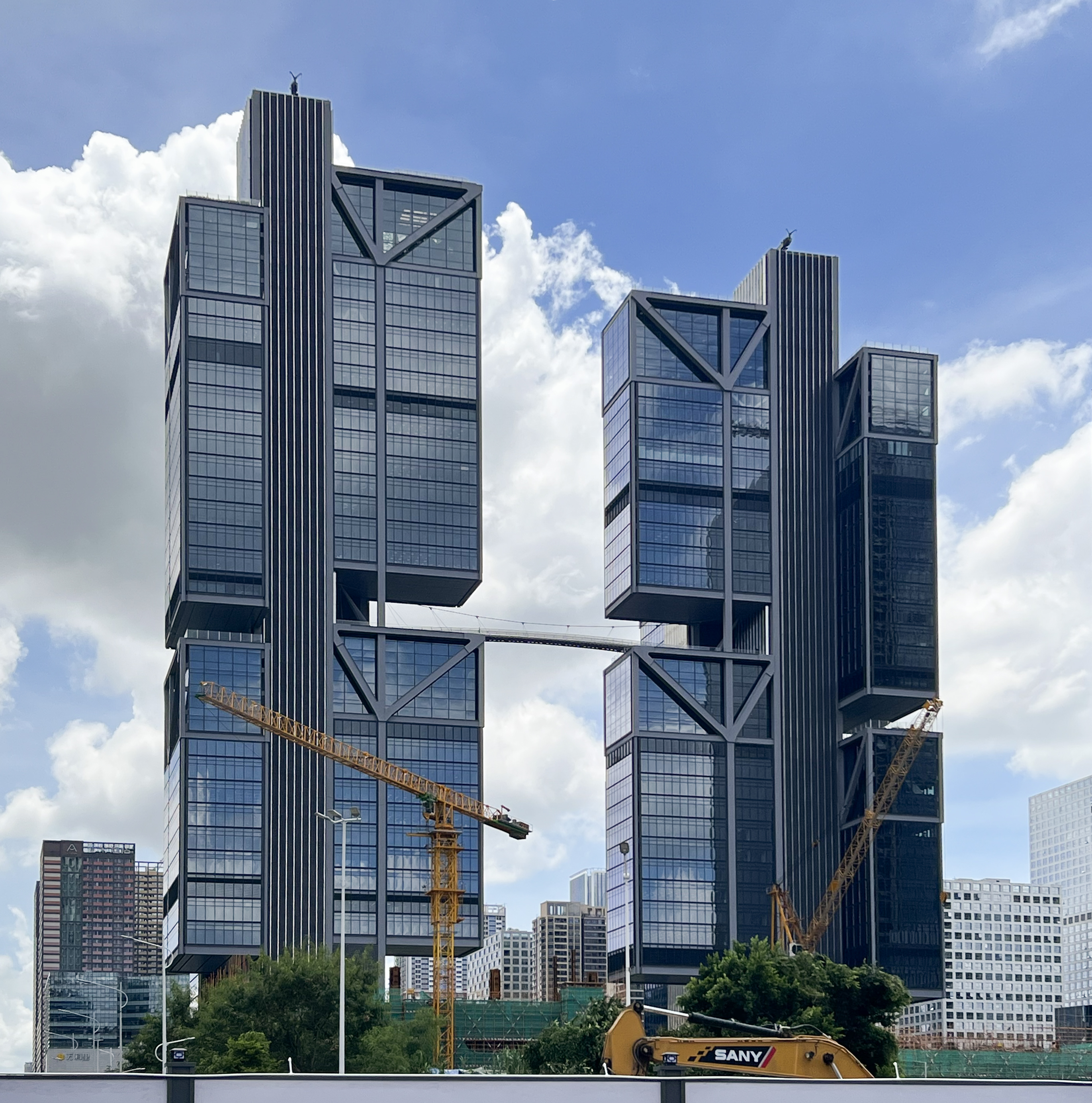
- Headquarters at DJI Sky City in Shenzhen
- Trade name: DJI
- Native name: 大疆创新科技有限公司
- Type: Private; partly state-owned
- Industry: Technology; consumer electronics; videography; photography
- Founded: January 18, 2006; 20 years ago
- Founder: Frank Wang (Wang Tao)
- Headquarters: DJI Sky City, Nanshan District, Shenzhen, Guangdong, China
- Products: Unmanned aerial vehicles; Camcorder; Camera stabilizer; Flight platform; Gimbal; Flight controller; Propulsion system; Robotics; Microphone
- Revenue: ▲CN¥80 billion (US$11.5 billion) (2025)
- Number of employees: 14,000 (2018)
- Divisions: China; Japan; North America; Europe; Latin America
- Subsidiaries: Hasselblad
- Website: www.dji.com

DJI
- Simplified Chinese: 大疆创新
Transcriptions
Standard Mandarin
- Hanyu Pinyin: Dà Jiāng Chuàngxīn

DJI is a Chinese technology company headquartered in Shenzhen, Guangdong. DJI manufactures commercial unmanned aerial vehicles (drones) for aerial photography and videography. It also designs and manufactures camera systems, gimbal stabilizers, propulsion systems, enterprise software, aerial agriculture equipment, and flight control systems.

DJI accounted for over 90% of the world's consumer drone market as of June 2024. Its camera drone technology is widely used in the music, television, and film industries. In the second quarter of 2026, DJI accounted for a substantial share of the global handheld smart camera market, with a market share of 73%.

The company's products have also been used by military and police forces, as well as terrorist groups, with the company taking steps to limit access to the latter. DJI products have drawn concerns over privacy, security and military use. Its drones have been used by combatants from all sides in the Russian invasion of Ukraine and by the Israeli military in the Gaza war.

== History ==
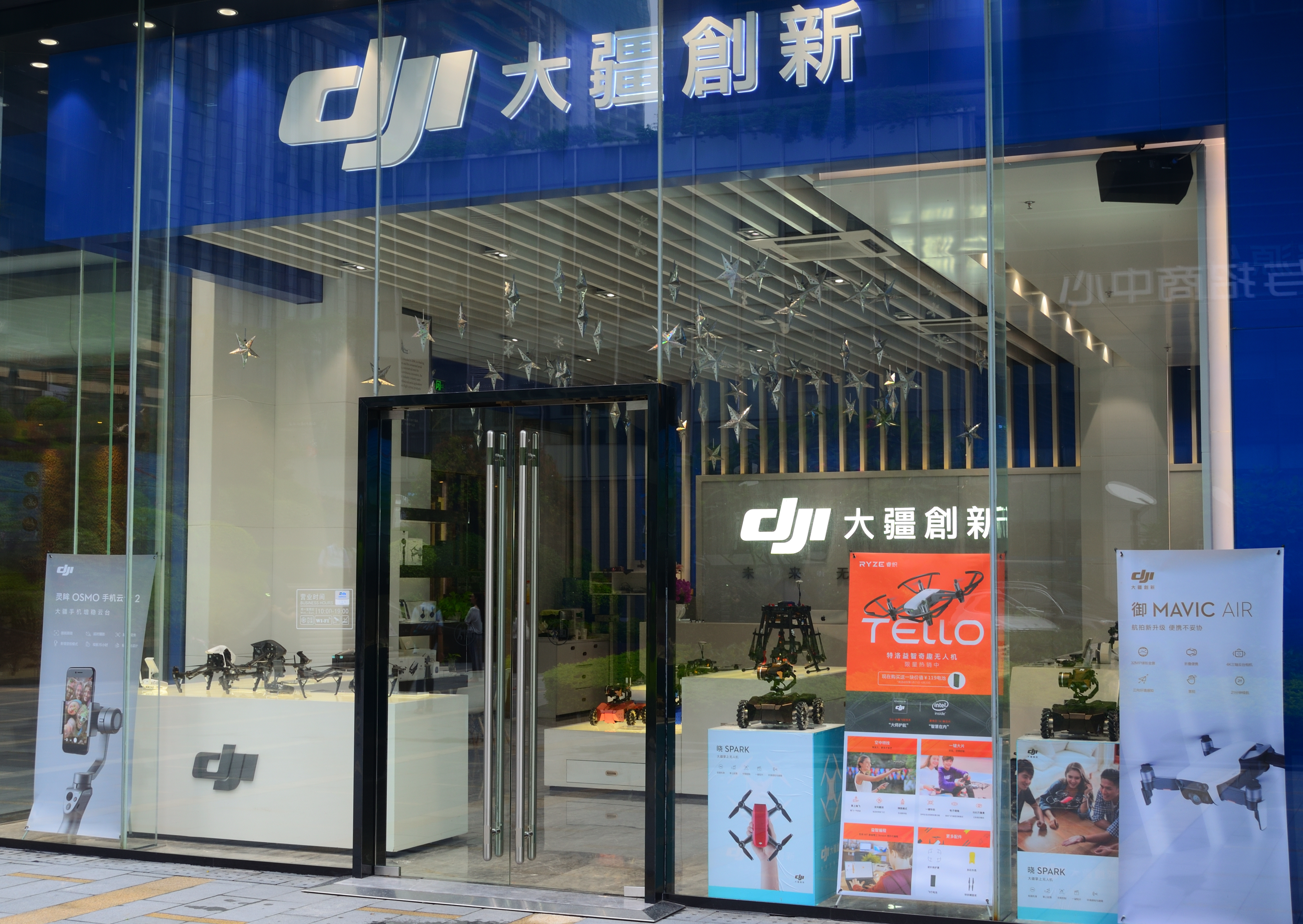
A DJI store in Shenzhen, Guangdong

The company was founded in 2006 by Frank Wang (Wāng Tāo, 汪滔). Born in Hangzhou, Zhejiang, he enrolled as a college student at the Hong Kong University of Science and Technology (HKUST) in 2003. He was part of the HKUST team participating in the ABU Robocon and won third prize.

Wang built the first prototypes of DJI's projects in his dorm room, selling the flight control components to universities and Chinese electric companies. He used the proceeds to move to the industrial hub of Shenzhen and hired a small staff in 2006. The company struggled at first with a high degree of turnover among employees, attributed to Wang's abrasive personality and perfectionist expectations. The company sold a modest number of components during this period, relying on financial support from Wang's family friend, Lu Di, who provided US$90,000 and managed the company's finances. In 2009, DJI's components enabled a team to successfully pilot a drone around the peak of Mt. Everest.

In 2010, Wang hired a high school friend, Swift Xie Jia, to run the company's marketing. DJI began to cater more to drone hobbyists in markets outside of China. In 2011, Wang met Colin Guinn at a trade show, and the two of them founded DJI North America, a subsidiary company focusing on mass market drone sales. In 2013, conflict erupted between Guinn and Wang, with the latter shutting down the American subsidiary. Guinn sued DJI, with the case eventually being settled out of court.

In 2013, DJI released the first model of the Phantom drone, DJI's fully assembled drone model. Priced at $629, Phantom was an entry-level drone, featuring much more user-friendly experiences than other drones on the market at the time. The DJI Phantom was considered the first commercially successful recreational drone and a significant model in consumer drone history. With its affordability, accessibility, and user-friendly software, it quickly captured the consumer drone market from hobbyists, professionals, and introduced the modern aerial photography drone form factor to the general public.

In 2015, DJI eclipsed the success of the Phantom with the Phantom 3, whose even greater popularity was in part due to the addition of a built-in live-streaming camera. DJI was now the largest consumer drone company in the world, driving many of its competitors out of the market. 2015 also marked the beginning of DJI's RoboMaster Robotics Competition (机甲大师赛), an annual international collegiate robot combat tournament held at the Shenzhen Bay Sports Centre. In November 2015, DJI announced the establishment of a strategic partnership with Hasselblad. In January 2019, DJI acquired a majority stake in Hasselblad.

In 2017, DJI won a Technology and Engineering Emmy Award for its camera drone technology, which was used in the filming of various television shows including The Amazing Race, American Ninja Warrior, Better Call Saul, and Game of Thrones. That same year, Wang became Asia's youngest tech billionaire, and the world's first drone billionaire. Also in 2017, DJI signed a strategic cooperation agreement to provide surveillance drones for use by the Chinese police in Xinjiang.

On June 5, 2018, police body cam and Taser maker Axon announced a partnership with DJI to sell surveillance drones to US police departments. As of 2020, DJI products were also widely used by US police and fire departments, with about 90% of drones used by public safety agencies originated from DJI. On January 21, 2019, DJI announced that an internal probe had uncovered "extensive" fraud by some employees who "inflated the costs of parts and materials for certain products for personal financial gain." DJI estimated the cost of the fraud at "up to CN¥1 billion" (US$147 million), but maintained that the company "did not incur a full-year loss in 2018."

In January 2020, the United States Department of the Interior announced that it would be grounding around 800 drones, which it had been using for wildlife conservation and infrastructure monitoring purposes. By March 2020, DJI had retained 77% of the US market share for consumer drones, with no other company holding more than 4%. In 2020, DJI drones were being used by many countries around the world to combat the COVID-19 pandemic. In China, DJI drones were used by the police force to remind people to wear masks. In other countries, such as Morocco and Saudi Arabia, their drones were used to disinfect urban areas and monitor human temperatures in order to contain the spread of COVID-19.

In June 2022, Patent Trial and Appeal Board (PTAB) accepted a probe into the validity of Textron's patent, as Textron accused DJI of violating its patent regarding aircraft flight control systems for relative positioning to target vehicles and automatic hovering. In April 2023, a US jury found that DJI's drones with automatic hovering capabilities violated Textron's. The federal court ordered DJI to pay $279 million in damages. In a separate legal battle, DJI challenged the Textron patent as invalid on the grounds of obviousness, cited prior art, but PTAB denied the probe request.

In 2024, DJI began to produce electric bicycle motors, diversifying product lines. In 2025, DJI introduced its first robot vacuum cleaner, the DJI Romo. About 7000 Romo vacuum cleaners were hacked by a Spain-based French engineer Sammy Azdoufal in early‑2026 as he tried to use his PlayStation Gamepad to control his own vacuum cleaner. DJI later thanked Azdoufal on X for reporting the vulnerability; in March 2026, The Verge reported that the company had paid him $30,000 for one of his findings. In February 2026, DJI sued the United States government to challenge an import ban on its drones, arguing the restrictions were unlawful and would harm U.S. businesses and consumers reliant on its technology.

In October 2026, the Financial Times reported that DJI had overtaken GoPro in the global handheld smart camera market. Citing data from consultancy firm IDC, the newspaper reported DJI holding 73% market share in the second quarter of 2026.

== Corporate structure ==
In 2018, DJI raised roughly $1 billion in funds in preparation for an envisioned IPO on the Hong Kong Stock Exchange. As of July 2020, these rumors persisted with no indication that an IPO was forthcoming. The company had previously raised $500 million in a 2015 funding round from investors including state-owned New China Life Insurance, GIC, and New Horizon Capital, the latter being co-founded by the son of China's former premier minister, Wen Jiabao. DJI has also received investment from Shanghai Venture Capital Co., SDIC Unity Capital, owned by the State Development and Investment Corporation, and China Chengtong Holdings Group, owned by the State-owned Assets Supervision and Administration Commission of the State Council. DJI denies they are a state-owned company, citing state-affiliated investor counts less than six percent of the company ownership and with less than 1% voting rights. DJI counts roughly 14,000 employees and has 17 offices internationally. The company is known for having a very difficult hiring process as well as an extremely competitive internal culture where teams are often pitted against each other to design better products. DJI's factories in Shenzhen include sophisticated automated assembly lines. Many of the components for these assembly lines are built in-house.

== Products ==
=== Flight controller ===
| Model | A2 | Naza V2 | Wookong-M | Naza-M Lite |
|---|---|---|---|---|
| Number of motors supported | 4–8 | 4–8 | 4–8 | 4–6 |
| Has built-in receiver | yes (2.4 GHz) | no | no | no |
| Hovering accuracy (m) | vertical: ±0.5m / horizontal: ±1.5m | vertical: ±0.8m / horizontal: ±2.5m | vertical: ±0.5m / horizontal: ±2m | vertical: ±0.8m / horizontal: ±2.5m |
| Motor-rotor configuration | quad-rotor: +4,X4; hex-rotor: +6,X6,Y6,Rev Y6; octo-rotor: +8,X8,V8 | quad-rotor: I4, X4; hex-rotor: I6, X6, IY6, Y6; octo-rotor: I8,V8,X8 | quad-rotor: +4,X4; hex-rotor: +6,X6,Y6,Rev Y6; octo-rotor: +8,X8,V8 | quad-rotor I4, X4; hex-rotor I6, X6, IY6, Y6 |

=== Modules ===
| Module | Lightbridge | PMU (A2, Wookong, Naza V2, Naza Lite) | iOSD MARK II | iOSD mini | BTU |
|---|---|---|---|---|---|
| Type (Purpose) | Video Downlink | Power Management | On-Screen Display | On-Screen Display | Bluetooth Link |
| Works With | A2, Wookong-M, Naza V2 | A2, Wookong-M, Naza V2, Naza-M Lite | A2, Wookong-M, Naza V2 | A2, Wookong-M, Naza V2 | Naza V2 |
| Interface | CAN Bus | CAN Bus, Battery Connection | CAN Bus | CAN Bus | CAN Bus |
| Battery Requirements | 4S-6S Lipo | 4S-12S Lipo | 4S Lipo and Shared Flight Controller Power | 2S Lipo and Shared Flight Controller Power | Shared Flight Controller Power |

=== Camera drones ===
==== Flame Wheel ====
The Flame Wheel (风火轮) series are multirotor platforms for aerial photography. As of 2016, there is the hexacopter F550 and the quadcopters F330 and F450. The most recent is the ARF KIT.

| Model | Flame Wheel F330 | Flame Wheel F450 | Flame Wheel F550 |
|---|---|---|---|
| Diagonal wheelbase (cm) | 33 | 45 | 69 |
| Frame weight (g) | 156 | 282 | 478 |
| Take-off weight (g) | 600–1250 | 800–1600 | 1200–2400 |

==== Phantom ====
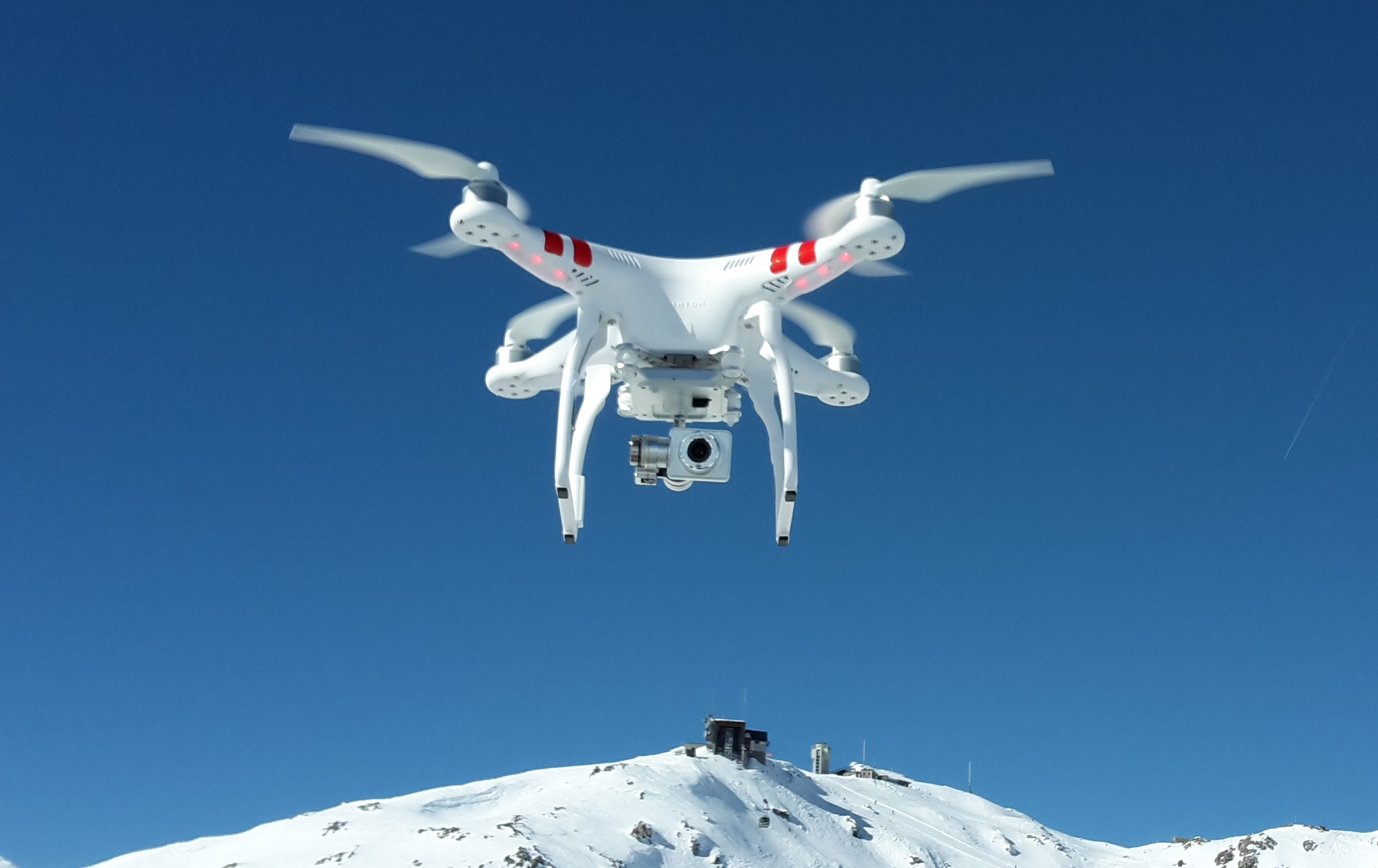
A DJI Phantom 2 Vision+ V3.0

The Phantom (精灵) series has evolved to integrate flight programming with a camera, Wi-Fi or Lightbridge connectivity, and the pilot's mobile device. Phantoms are made for aerial cinematography and photography applications, but they are also used for recreational purposes.

==== Spark ====
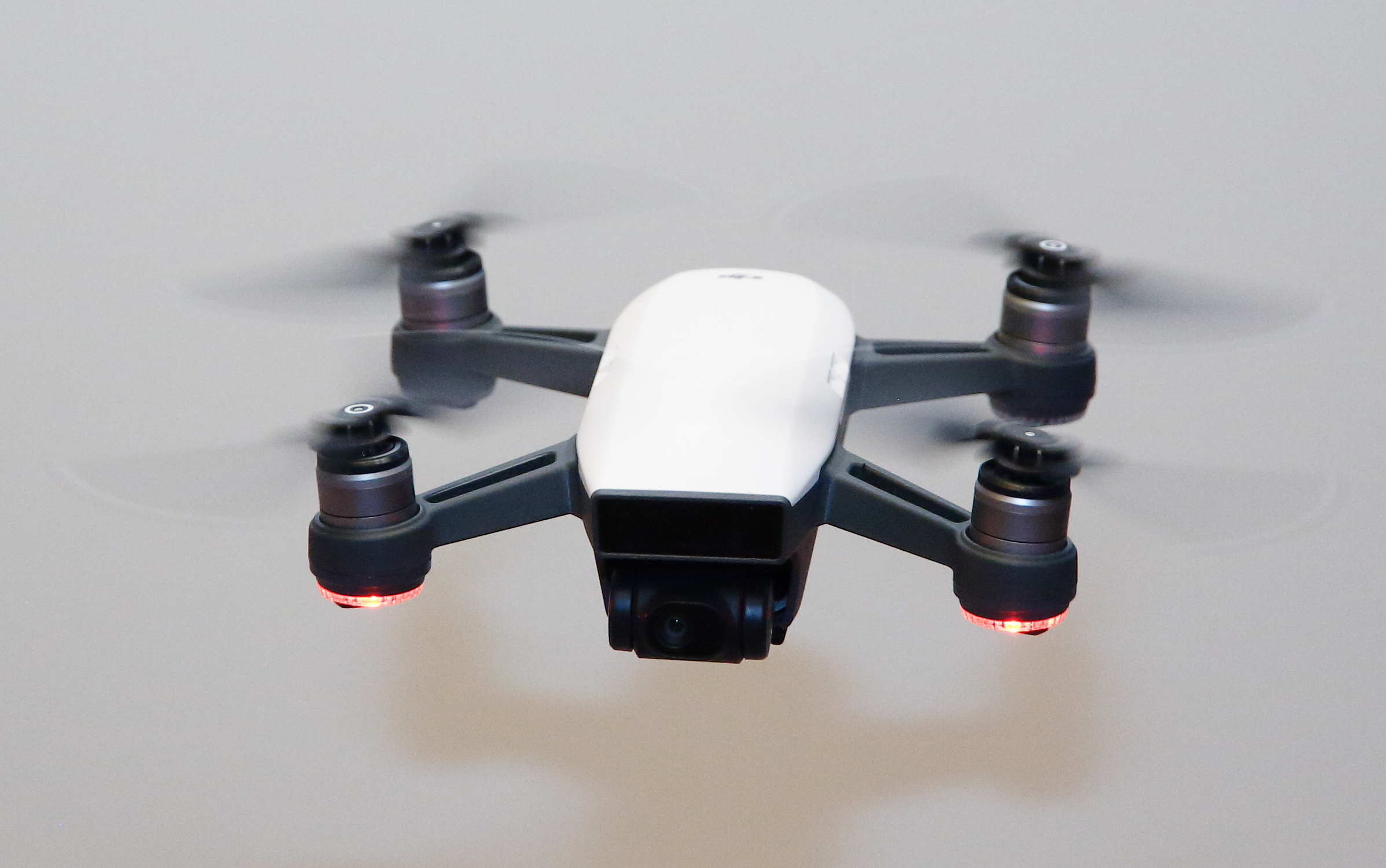
DJI Spark

Released in May 2017, the Spark (晓) features a 12-megapixel camera stabilized mechanically by a 2-axis gimbal. The Spark also carries an advanced infrared 3D camera that helps the drone detect obstacles in front of it as well as facilitate hand-gesture control. In addition to a smartphone app with a virtual controller, a physical controller can also be bought. There have been multiple complaints that the drone switches off and falls while flying. DJI responded to this by releasing a mandatory battery firmware update in August 2017.

==== Mavic ====
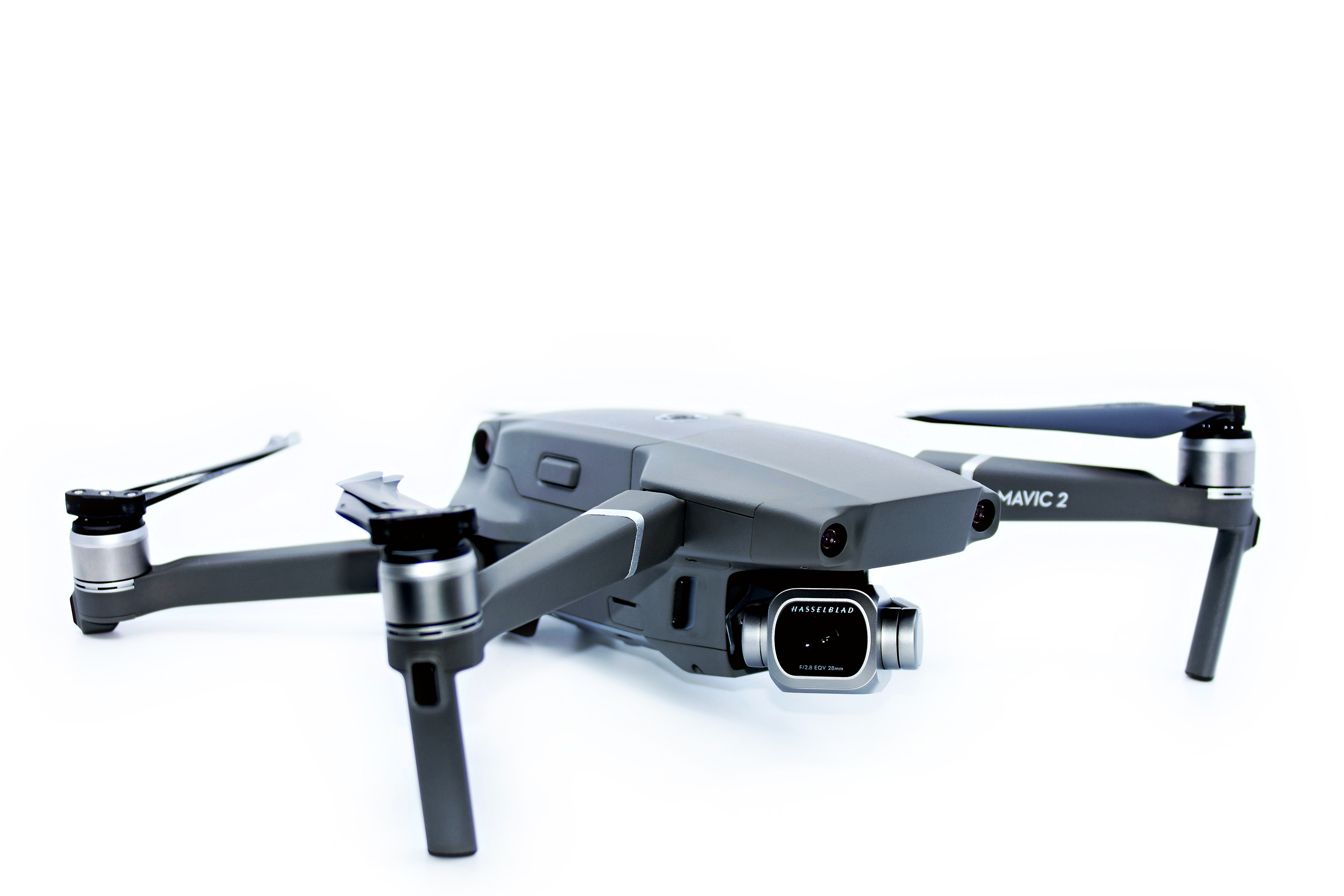
Mavic 2 Pro unfolded

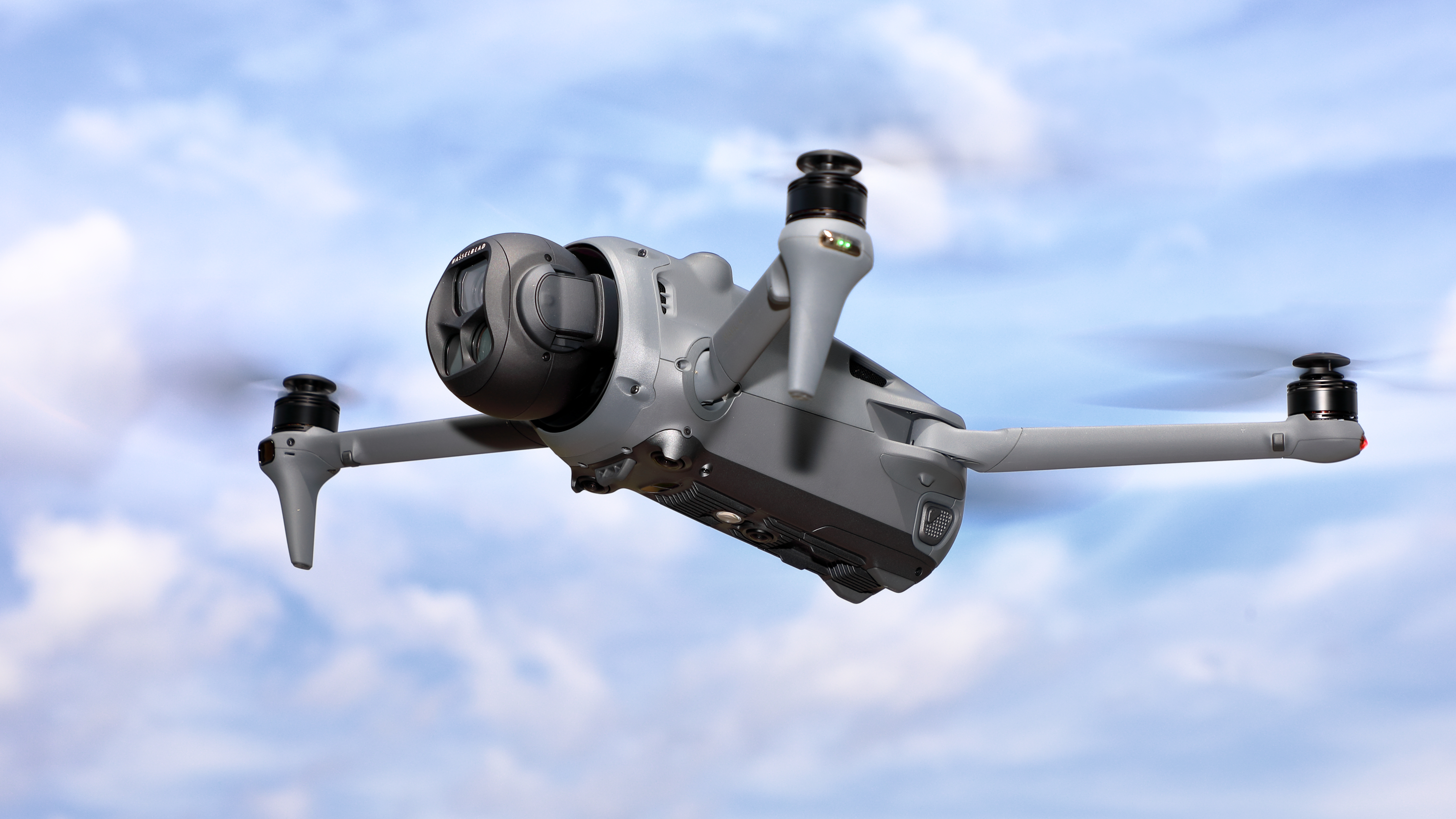
DJI Mavic 4 Pro drone in flight

The Mavic (御) series currently includes Mavic Pro, Mavic Pro Platinum, Mavic Air, Mavic Air 2, Air 2S, Mavic 2 Pro, Mavic 2 Zoom, Mavic 2 Enterprise, Mavic 2 Enterprise Advanced, Mavic 3, Mavic 3 Cine, Mavic 3 Pro, Mavic 3 Pro Cine, Mavic 3 Classic, Mavic Mini, Mini SE, Mini 2, Mini 3, Mini 3 Pro, and Mini 4 Pro. The release of the Mavic Air 2 was not without controversy, however, as DJI announced that a key safety feature, AirSense (ADS-B), would not be available on models outside the US. Shortages on components and complexities of production owing to the ongoing COVID-19 pandemic at the time were blamed. Starting with the Mini 2, the Mavic name was dropped from most of the new models, such as the Air 2S and the Mini SE. DJI released the Air 2S on April 15, 2021.

The DJI Mavic 3 and the Mavic 3 Cine were released on November 4, 2021. The Mavic 3 superseded the Mavic 2 Pro and the Mavic 2 Zoom and was priced for prosumers and professionals more than hobbyists. The Mavic 3 Enterprise and Mavic 3 Thermal were released on September 27, 2022, and superseded the Phantom 4 RTK and Mavic 2 Enterprise Advanced drones in surveying, inspection, safety, and rescue tasks. The DJI Mavic 3 Pro and Pro Cine were released in May 2023, with both versions having three cameras. On 13 May 2025, DJI released the Mavic 4 Pro with a 100 MP 4/3″ Hasselblad sensor, 360° "Infinity" gimbal, 51 min flight time, and omnidirectional obstacle avoidance.

==== Neo ====
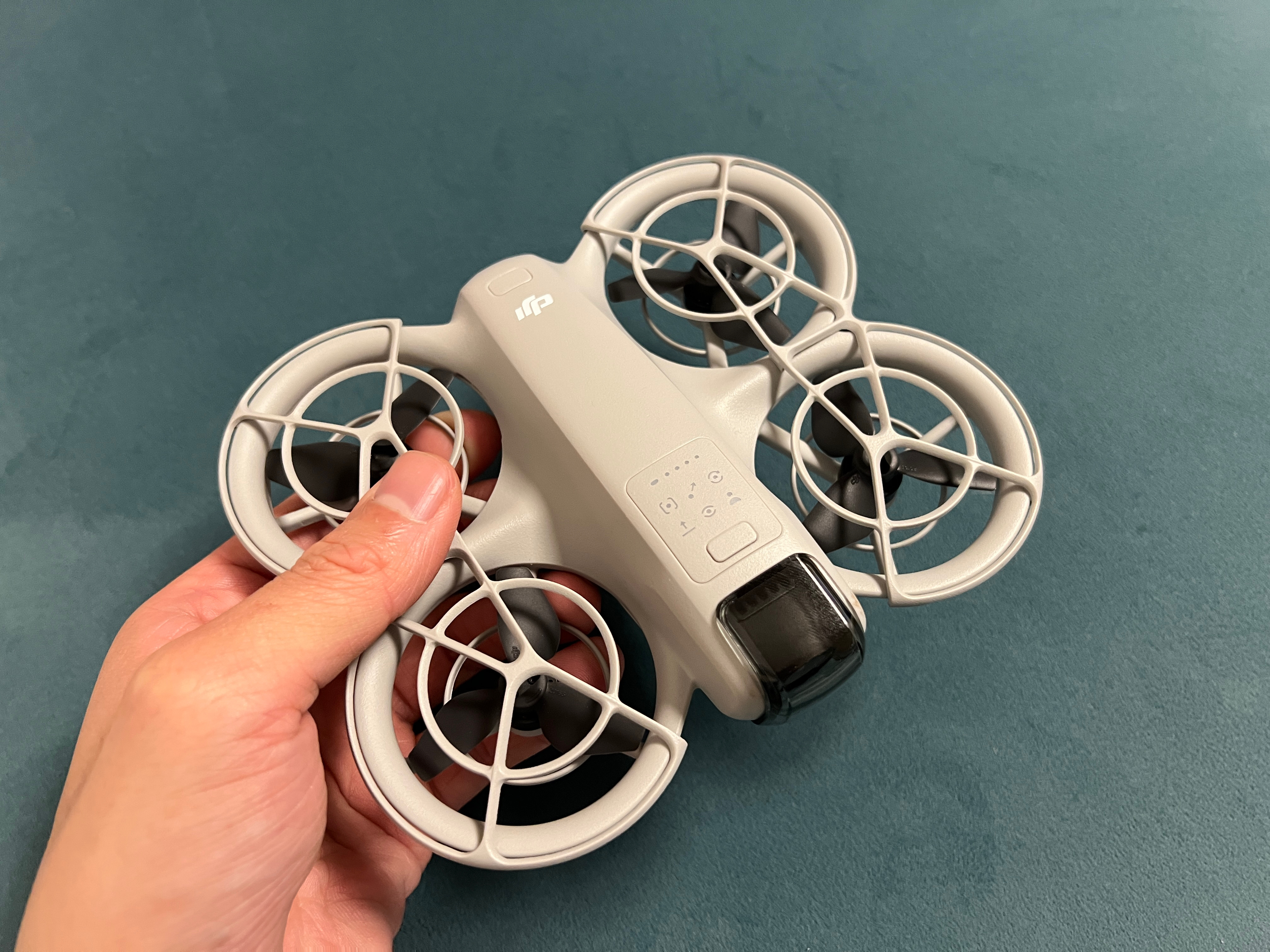
DJI Neo 2024

The DJI Neo is an ultra-lightweight drone released in 2024.

==== Flip ====
The DJI Flip (company designation DF1A0424) is a teleoperated compact quadcopter drone for personal and commercial aerial photography and videography use, released by the Chinese technology company DJI.

==== Inspire ====
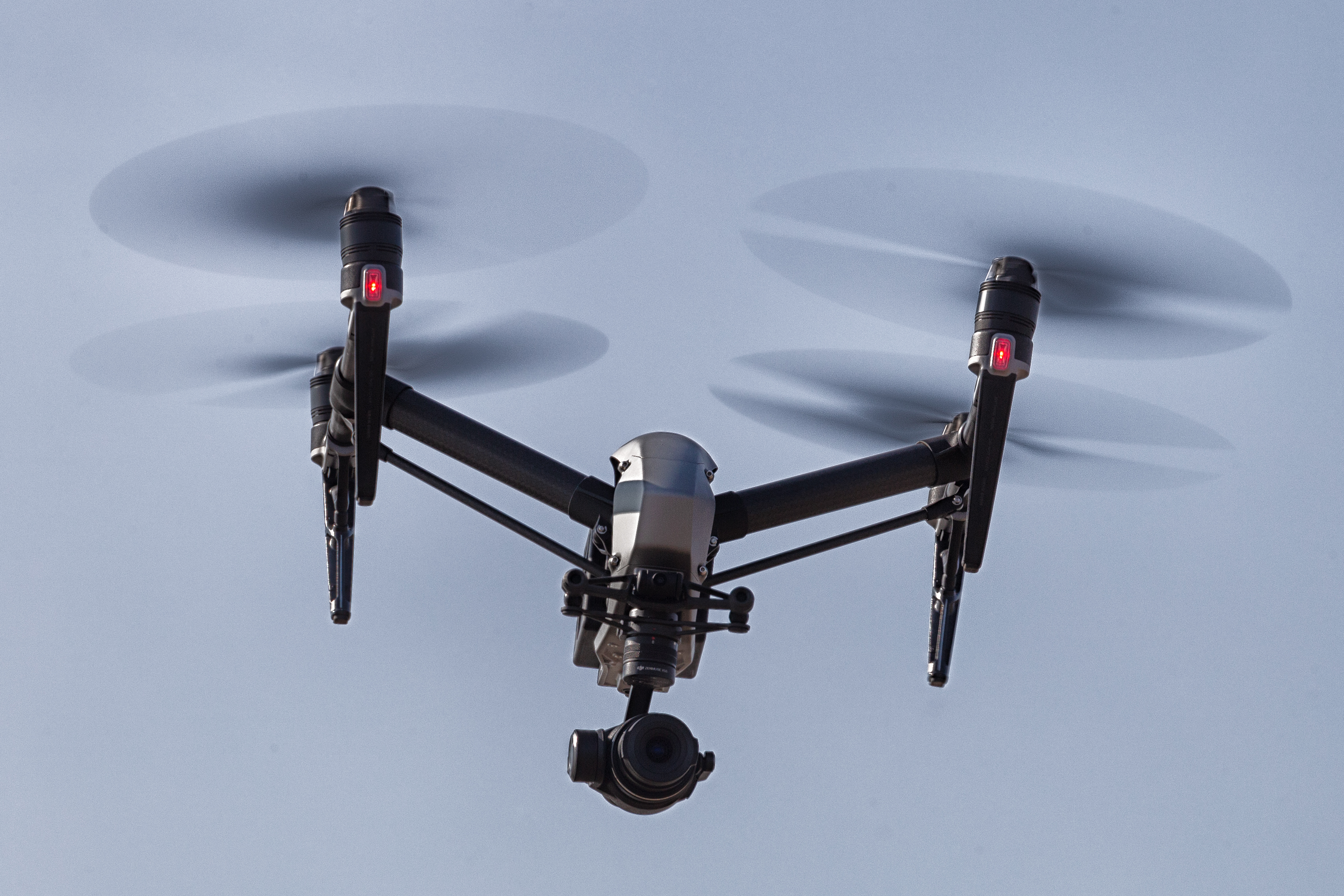
DJI Inspire 2

The Inspire series is a professional series of camera quadcopters similar to the Phantom line, but with an aluminium-magnesium body with carbon fibre arms, as well as detachable props on the Inspire 2. It was presented in 2017.

Inspire specifications:

| Model | Inspire 1 | Inspire 1 Pro | Inspire 2 | Inspire 3 |
|---|---|---|---|---|
| Weight | 3060 g (includes propellers, battery, and Zenmuse X3) | 3400 g (includes battery, propellers, and Zenmuse X5) | 3440 g (includes propellers and two batteries, without gimbal and camera) | 3995 g (includes gimbal camera, two batteries, lens, PROSSD, and propellers) |
| Max Takeoff Weight | 3500 g | 3500 g | 4250 g | 4310 g |
| Hovering Accuracy Range | Vertical: ± 0.5 m (with GPS positioning) Horizontal: ± 2.5 m (with GPS positioning) | Vertical: ± 0.5 m (with GPS positioning) Horizontal: ± 2.5 m (with GPS positioning) | Vertical: ± 0.5 m (with GPS positioning) ± 0.1 m (with Downward Vision System enabled) Horizontal: ± 1.5 m (with GPS positioning) ± 0.3 m (with Downward Vision System enabled) | Vertical: ± 0.1 m (with vision positioning) ± 0.5 m (with GNSS/GPS positioning) ± 0.1 m (with RTK positioning) Horizontal: ± 0.3 m (with vision positioning) ± 0.5 m (with GNSS/GPS positioning) ± 0.1 m (with RTK positioning) |
| Max Angular Velocity | Pitch: 300°/s Yaw: 150°/s | Pitch: 300°/s Yaw: 150°/s | Pitch: 300°/s Yaw: 150°/s | Pitch: 200º/s Yaw: 150º/s Roll: 200º/s |
| Max Tilt Angle | 35° | 35° | P-mode: 35º P-mode with Forward Vision System enabled: 25º A-mode: 35º S-mode: 40º | N Mode: 35° S Mode: 40° A Mode: 35° T Mode: 20° Emergency Brake: 55° |
| Max Ascent Speed | 5 m/s | 5 m/s | P-mode: 5 m/s A-mode: 5 m/s S-mode: 6 m/s | 8 m/s |
| Max Descent Speed | 4 m/s | 4 m/s | Vertical: 4 m/s Tilt: 9 m/s | Vertical: 8 m/s Tilt: 10 m/s |
| Max Speed | 21.9 m/s (ATTI mode, no wind) | 18 m/s (ATTI mode, no wind) | 26 m/s (Sport mode, no wind) | 26 m/s (Sport mode, no wind) |
| Max Service Ceiling Above Sea Level | Standard Propellers: 2500 m Specially-Designed Propellers: 4500 m | Standard Propellers: 2500 m Specially-Designed Propellers: 4500 m | Standard Propellers: 2500 m Specially-Designed Propellers: 5000 m | Standard Propellers: 3800 m High-Altitude Propellers: 7000 m |
| Max Wind Speed Resistance | 10 m/s | 10 m/s | 10 m/s | Takeoff/land: 12 m/s In-flight: 14 m/s |
| Operating Temperature Range | -10° to 40 °C | -10 to 40 °C | -20 to 40 °C | -20º to 40 °C |
| Max Flight Time (Hovering) | approx. 18 minutes | approx. 15 minutes | approx. 27 minutes | approx. 25 minutes |
| Release Date | November 13, 2014 | January 5, 2016 | November 16, 2016 | April 13, 2023 |

=== Industrial and agricultural UAVs ===
==== Spreading Wings ====
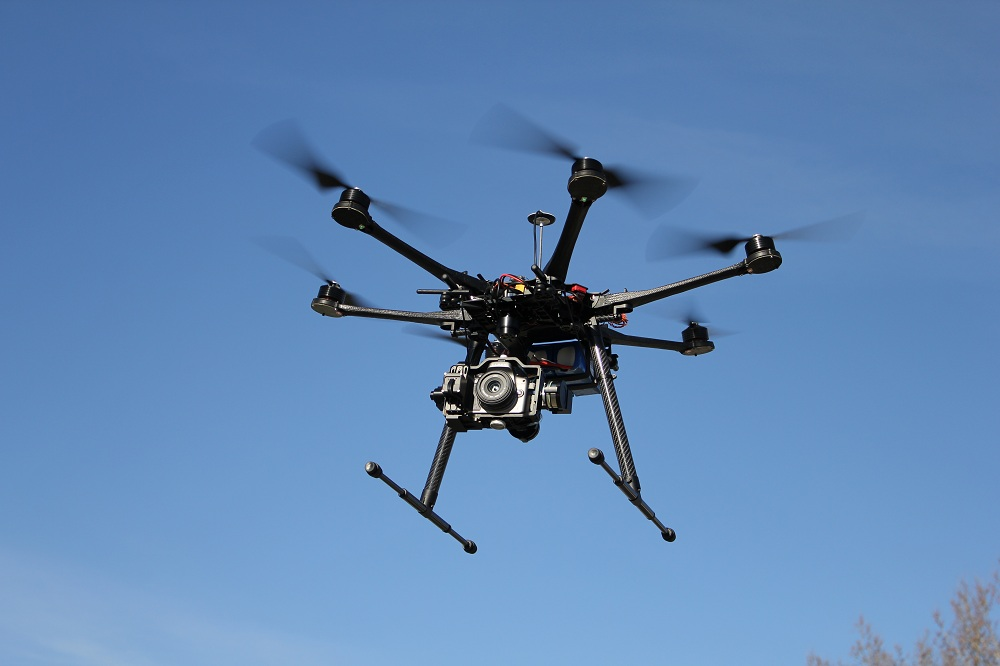
DJI Spreading Wings S800 hexacopter

The Spreading Wings (筋斗云) series are mainly industrial UAVs for professional aerial photography, high-definition 3D mapping, ultra-light search and rescue, and surveillance etc. based on camera gear on board. In 2013, two models were released: S800 regular and EVO.

| Model | Spreading Wings S800 | Spreading Wings S800 EVO | Spreading Wings S900 | Spreading Wings S1000 |
|---|---|---|---|---|
| Diagonal wheelbase (cm) | 80 | 80 | 90 | 104.5 |
| Empty weight (kg) | 2.6 | 3.7 | 3.3 | 4.2 |
| Take-off weight (kg) | 5–7 | 6–8 | 4.7–8.2 | 6–11 |
| Endurance (min) | 16 | 20 | 18 | 15 |
| Operating temperature (°C) | — | — | 10 to 40 | 10 to 40 |

==== Matrice ====
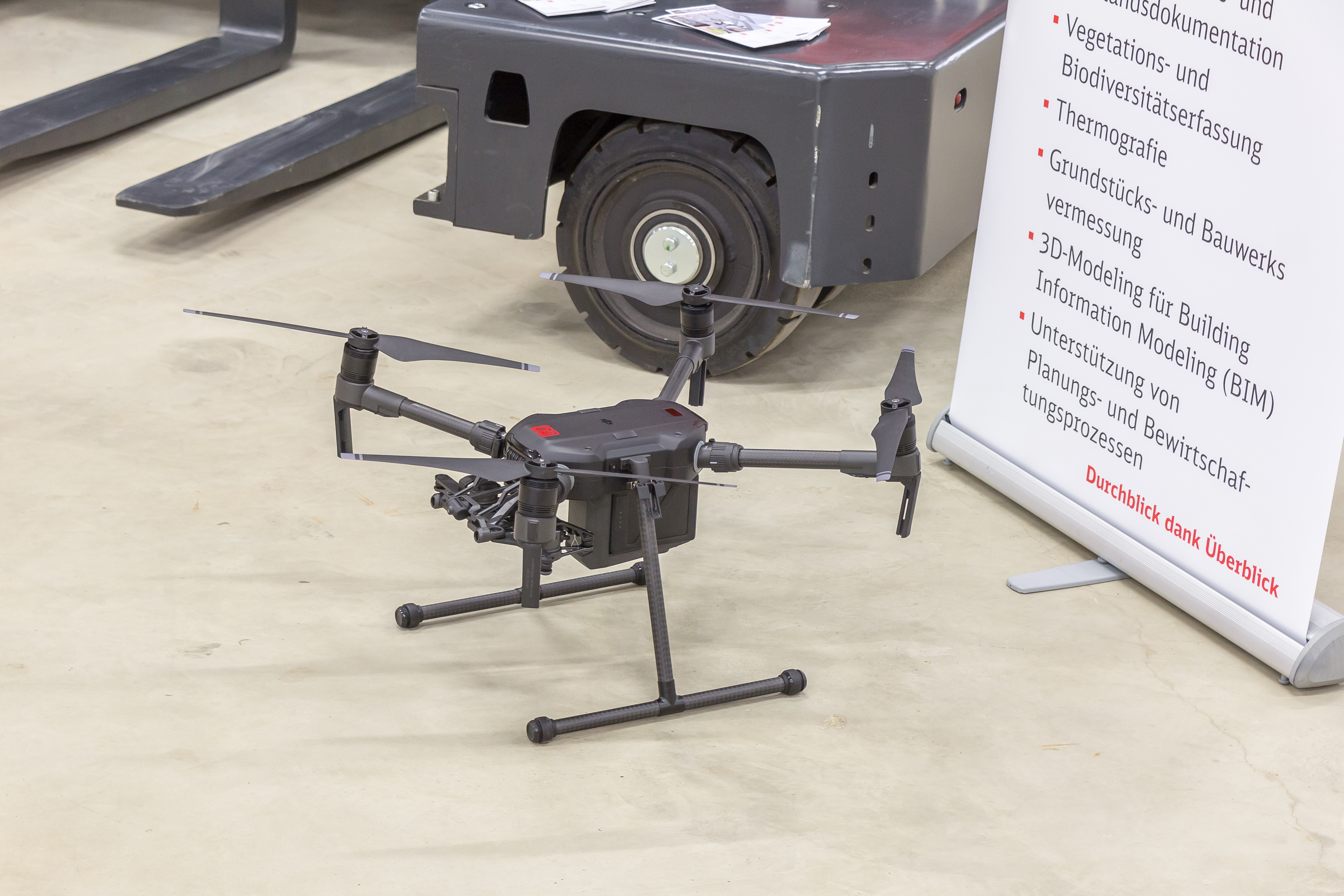
DJI Matrice 200 Series, used by Deutsche Bahn

The Matrice (经纬) series is designed for industrial applications, including surveying, inspection, search and rescue and firefighting. The Matrice 100 is a fully programmable and customizable drone, launched on July 6, 2015. It has expansion bay and communication ports, which allows developers to add additional components for different purposes.

==== Agras ====
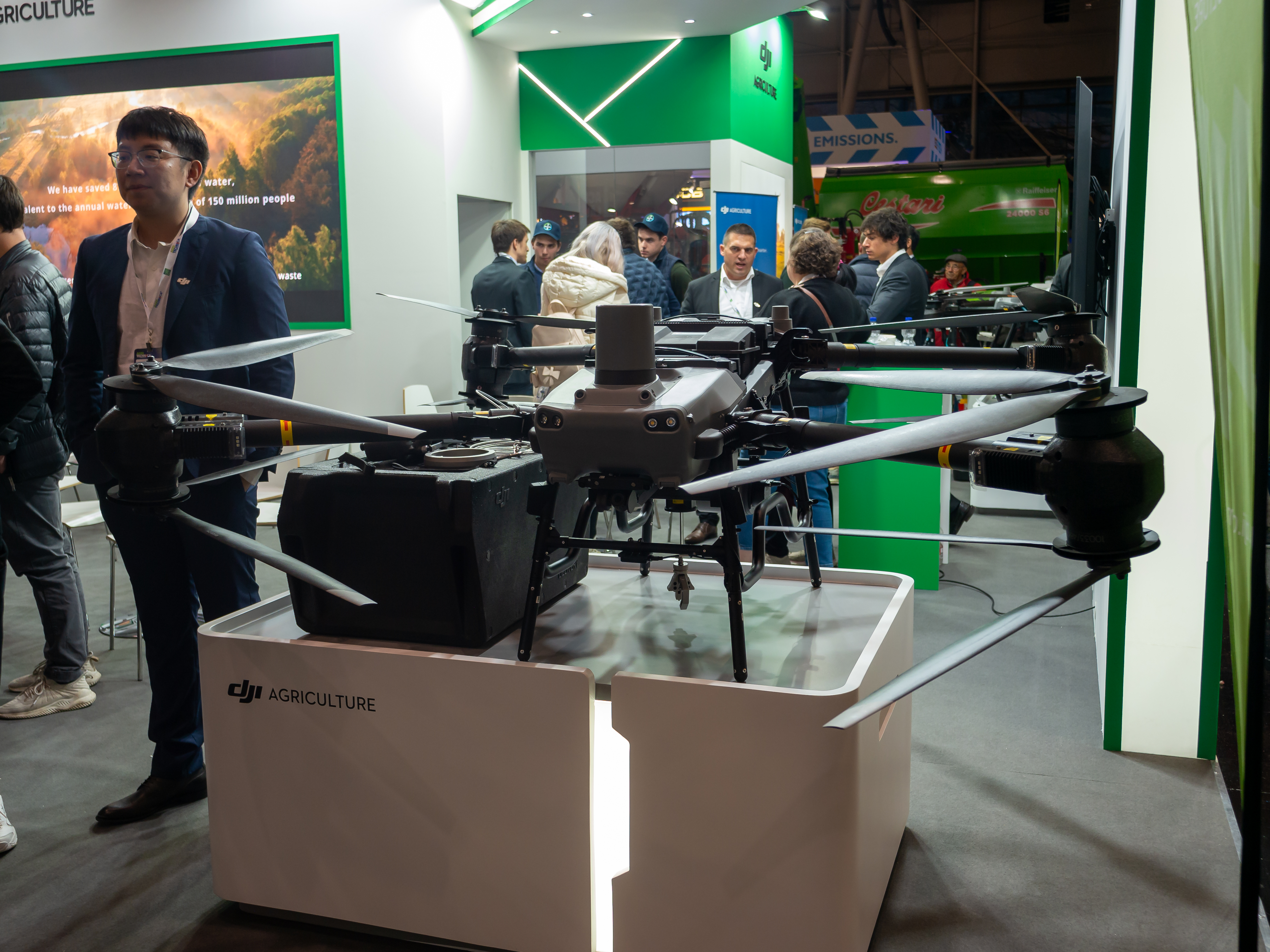
DJI FlyCart drone with hoist

Agras is DJI's agricultural drone series with a takeoff weight of 25–80 kg. These drones are used for spraying crops. Agras models have environmental protection and have IP67 rating for core parts and IP54 rating for batteries.

=== Stabilized cameras ===
==== Ronin ====
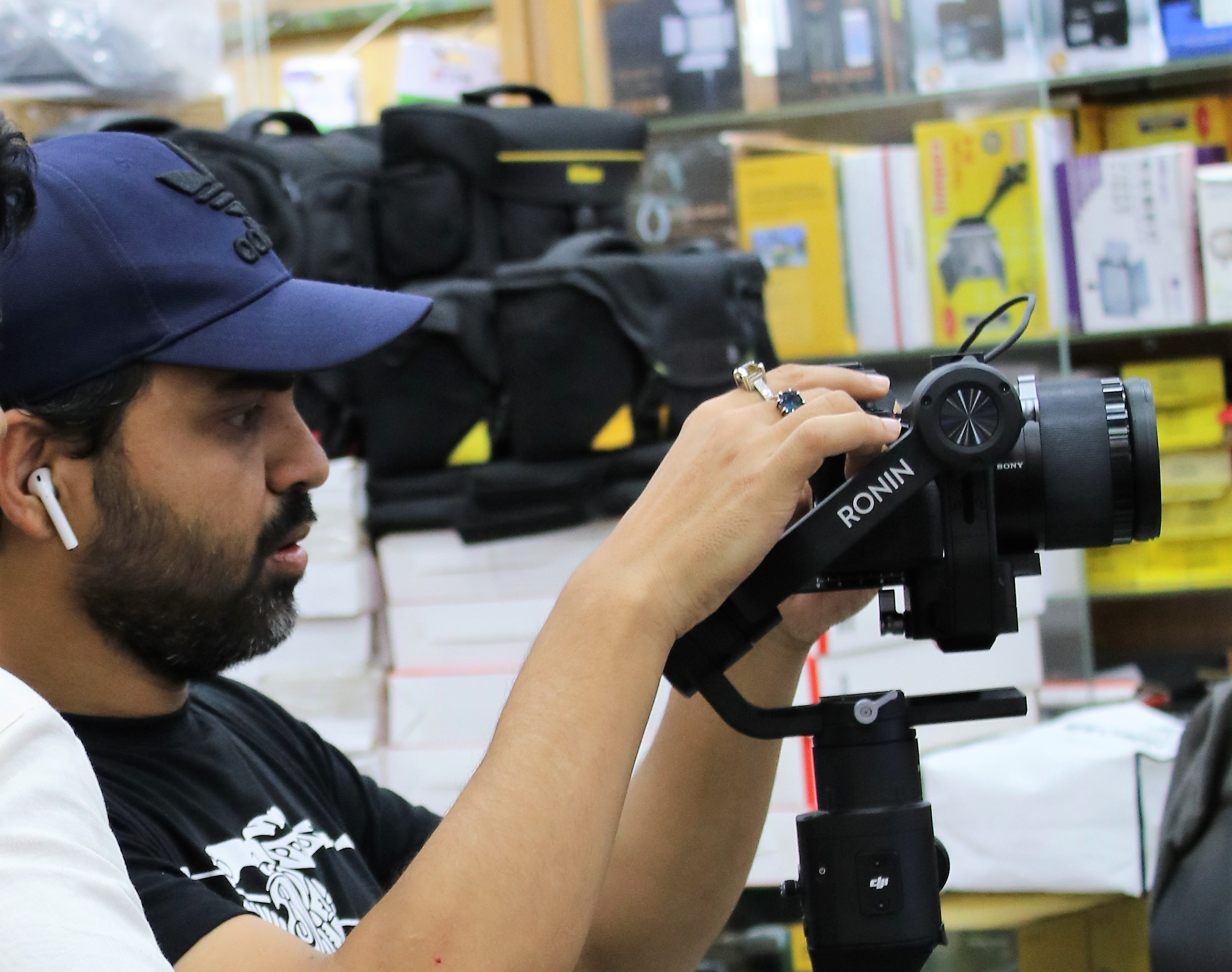
Habib Wahid using DJI Ronin

The Ronin (如影) is a standalone ground-based camera platform developed for cinematography and aerial filmmaking in professional environments. It is built for professional videography and photography and targets the film industry. By using three individual motors, Ronin stabilizes when moving vigorously. Later models of the Ronin include the Ronin-M, Ronin 2, Ronin-S, Ronin-SC, Ronin 4D, Ronin-S3, S3 Pro, and S3 Mini.

==== Osmo Series ====
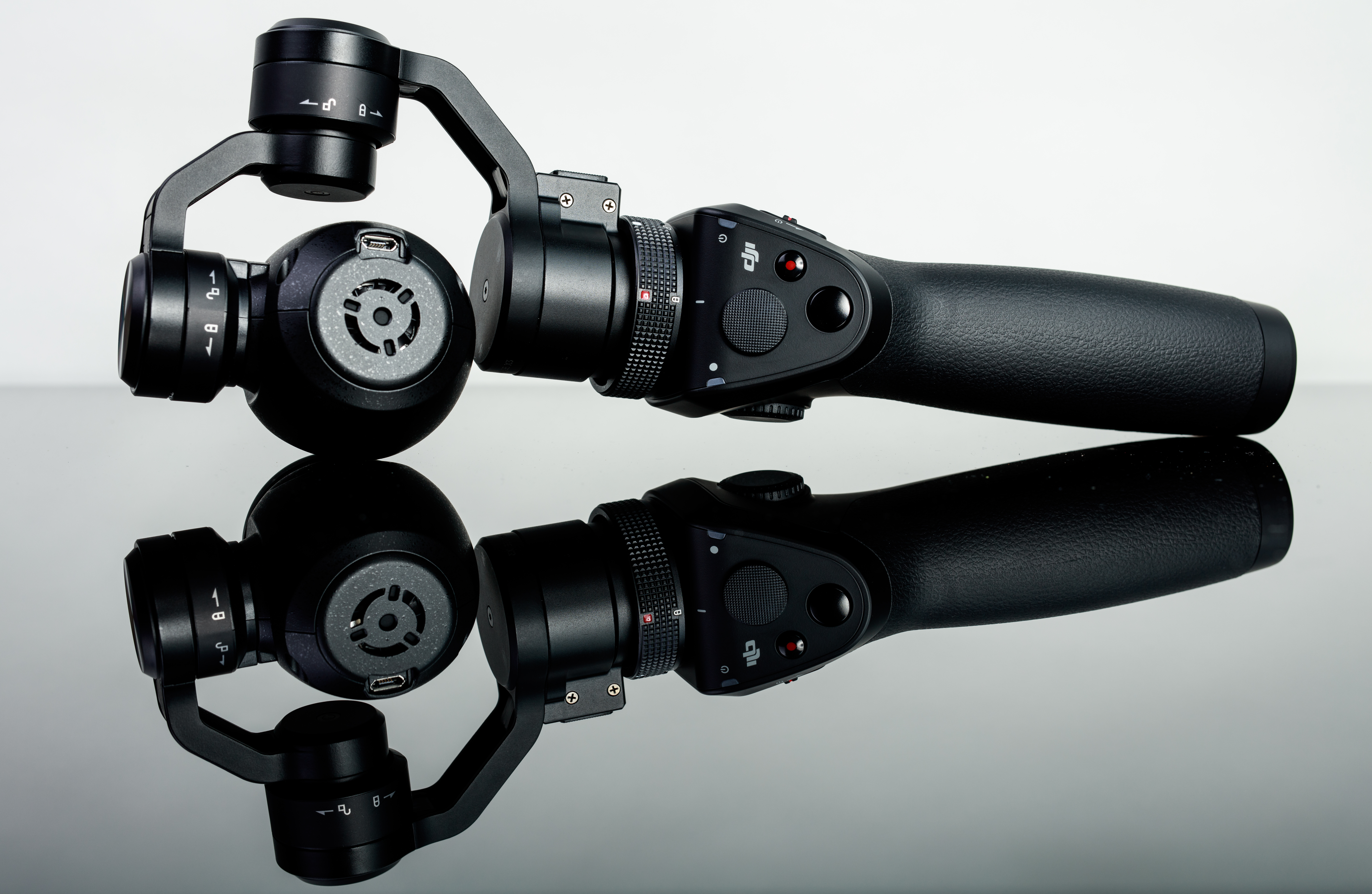
DJI Osmo camera

===== Osmo =====
The original Osmo (灵眸) is a camcorder developed by DJI. The camera uses a smartphone to view camera footage and can record 4K and take either 12–16 MP stills.

===== Osmo Mobile =====
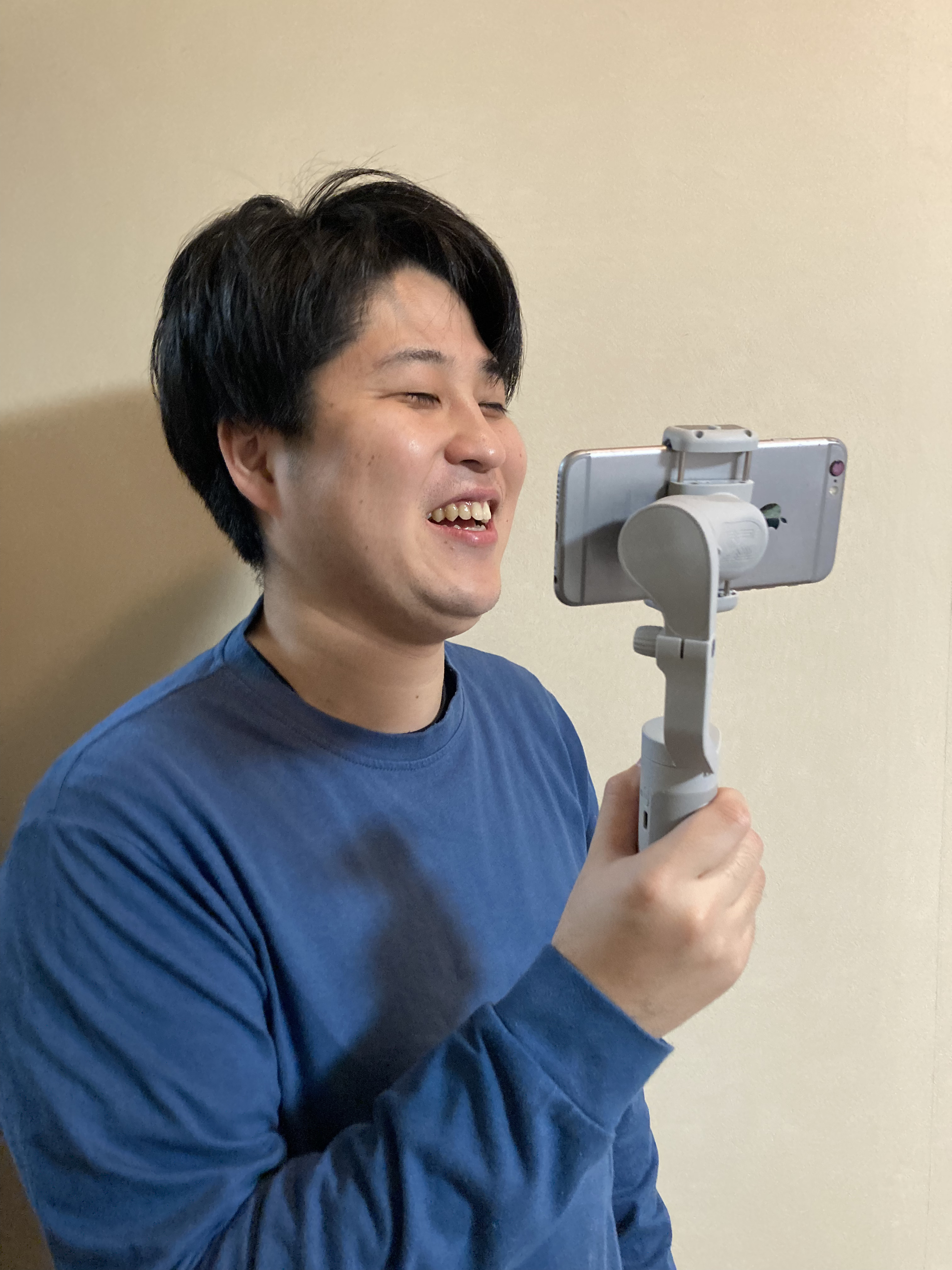
Man using DJI Osmo Mobile for smartphone

The first-generation Osmo Mobile was released on September 1, 2016, as a smartphone gimbal that relies on the user's smartphone as the camera. It uses three-axis stabilization and SmoothTrack™ technology to compensate for camera shake and deliver smooth, stabilized video footage. The Osmo Mobile 6, launched on September 2, 2022, builds on its predecessors by introducing a built-in status panel, a side wheel for zoom and focus control, the ActiveTrack 5.0 subject-tracking feature, and Quick Launch functionality for iPhones. Less than a year after the release of the Osmo Mobile 6, the Osmo Mobile SE was introduced as a more affordable alternative. It offers a foldable design, a built-in extension rod, and a larger 2,600mAh battery, but lacks the side wheel and Quick Launch feature.

===== Osmo Pocket =====
The Osmo Pocket was released on December 15, 2018. It integrates a 4K60fps camera with a 3-axis gimbal in a pocket-sized, handheld design. The second-generation Pocket 2, announced on October 20, 2020, introduced improvements such as a larger 1/1.7-inch sensor, the DJI Matrix Stereo audio system, a modular design, and up to 8× zoom.

The Osmo Pocket 3 was launched on October 25, 2023. It is a pocket-sized gimbal camera featuring a large 1-inch sensor optimized for low light, a 2-inch OLED touchscreen, and professional 10-bit D-Log M and 10-bit HLG color modes. The Osmo Pocket 4, launched on April 16, 2026, added two additional buttons, a 5D joystick, improved dynamic range and D-Log, ActiveTrack 7.0, slow shutter video and film tones, 107GB of internal storage, faster charging and longer runtime compared to the Pocket 3.

===== Osmo Action =====
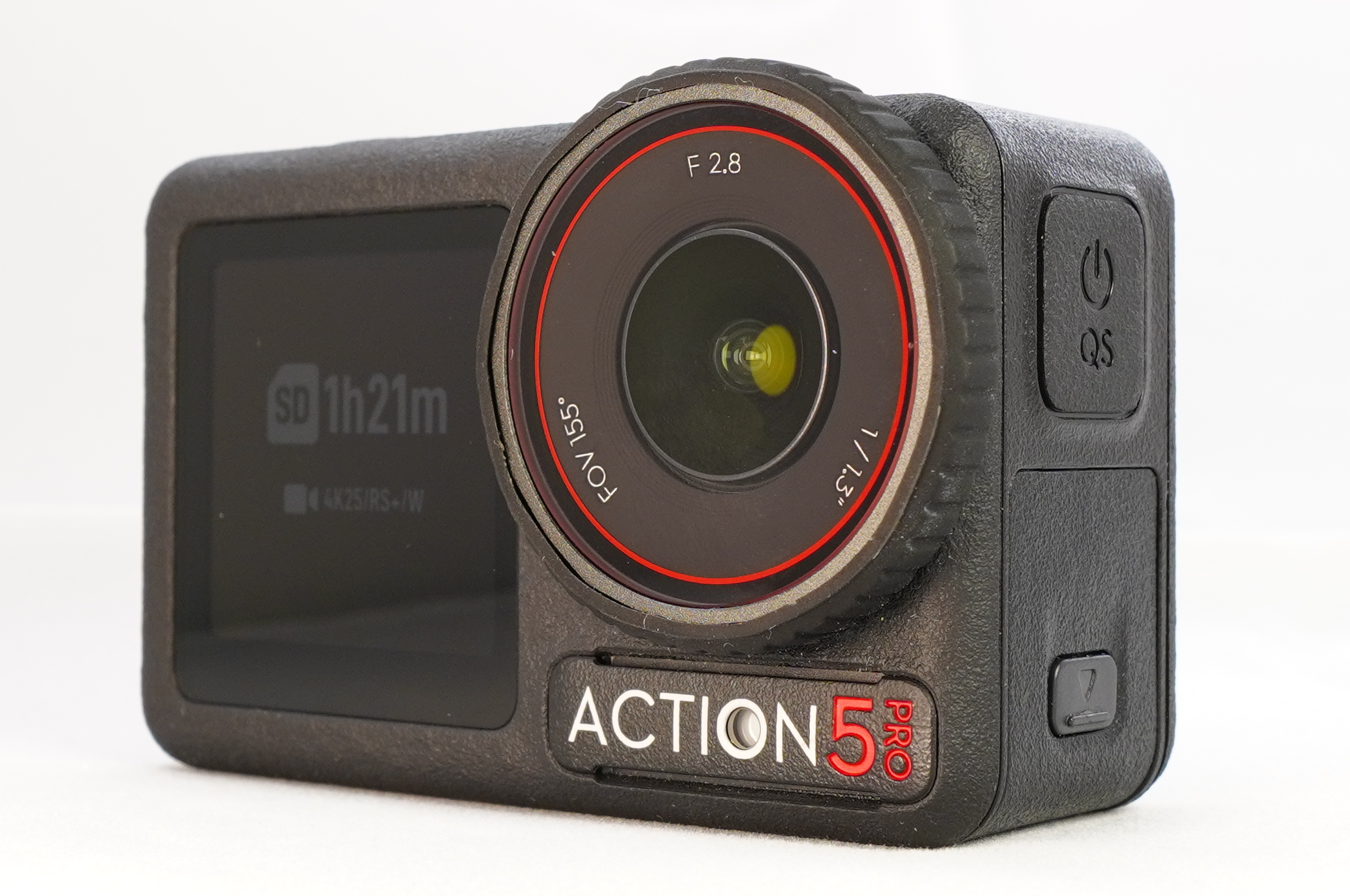
The Osmo Action 5 Pro

This first-generation Osmo Action was introduced on May 15, 2019, as a compact and durable action camera with 4K resolution, dual color screens, and RockSteady image stabilization technology. Osmo Action 4 was released on August 2, 2023, featuring a 1/1.3" sensor, 10-bit D-Log M color mode, and a new magnetic-quick release design. Osmo Action 5 Pro were released on September 19, 2024. It comes with 47GB internal storage, supports HLG, and is dive-rated to 20m underwater with a new depth/altitude gauge feature.

Osmo Action 6 was released in China on November 13, 2025, and globally on November 18, 2025. It features two 800 nit OLED displays and a 1/1.1" sensor with a variable aperture lens, adjustable from f/2 to f/4. The Action 6 requires the device to be activated before use, where failure to activate renders the camera inoperable. Registration is done with the DJI Mimo app (requiring location information to be shared), and a mandatory DJI account.

=== FPV Equipment ===
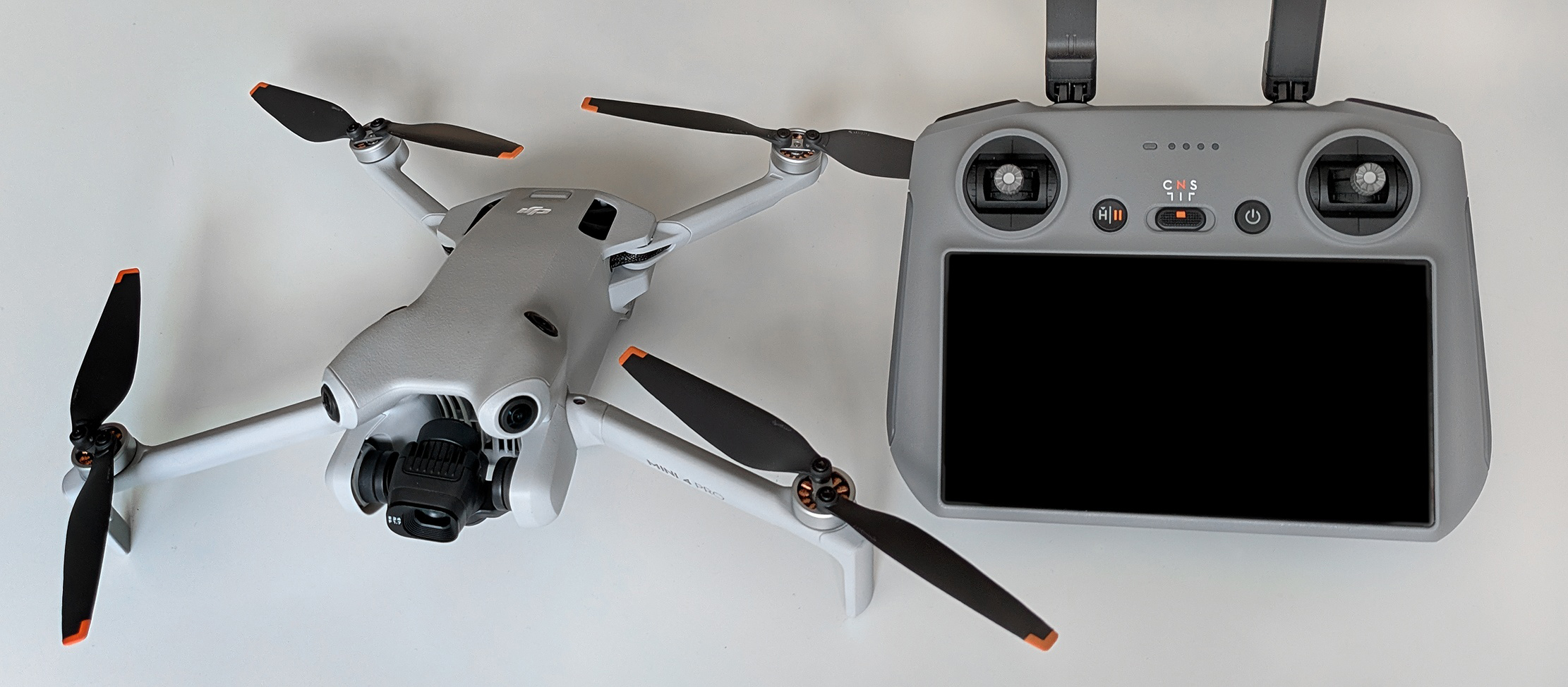
A DJI Mini 4 pro for hobby purposes

The DJI FPV series are head-mounted displays designed for FPV drone flying. There are two different product lines in the FPV series, the DJI Goggles (DJI飞行眼镜) and the Digital FPV System (FPV数字图传系统). The DJI Goggles are designed to interface with DJI-branded drones, using dual LCD, wireless connectivity and direct photo and video capture control. In November 2017, DJI also released DJI Goggles RE ("Racing Edition"), which featured compatibility with racing quadcopters.

=== Educational robots ===
==== RoboMaster S1 ====
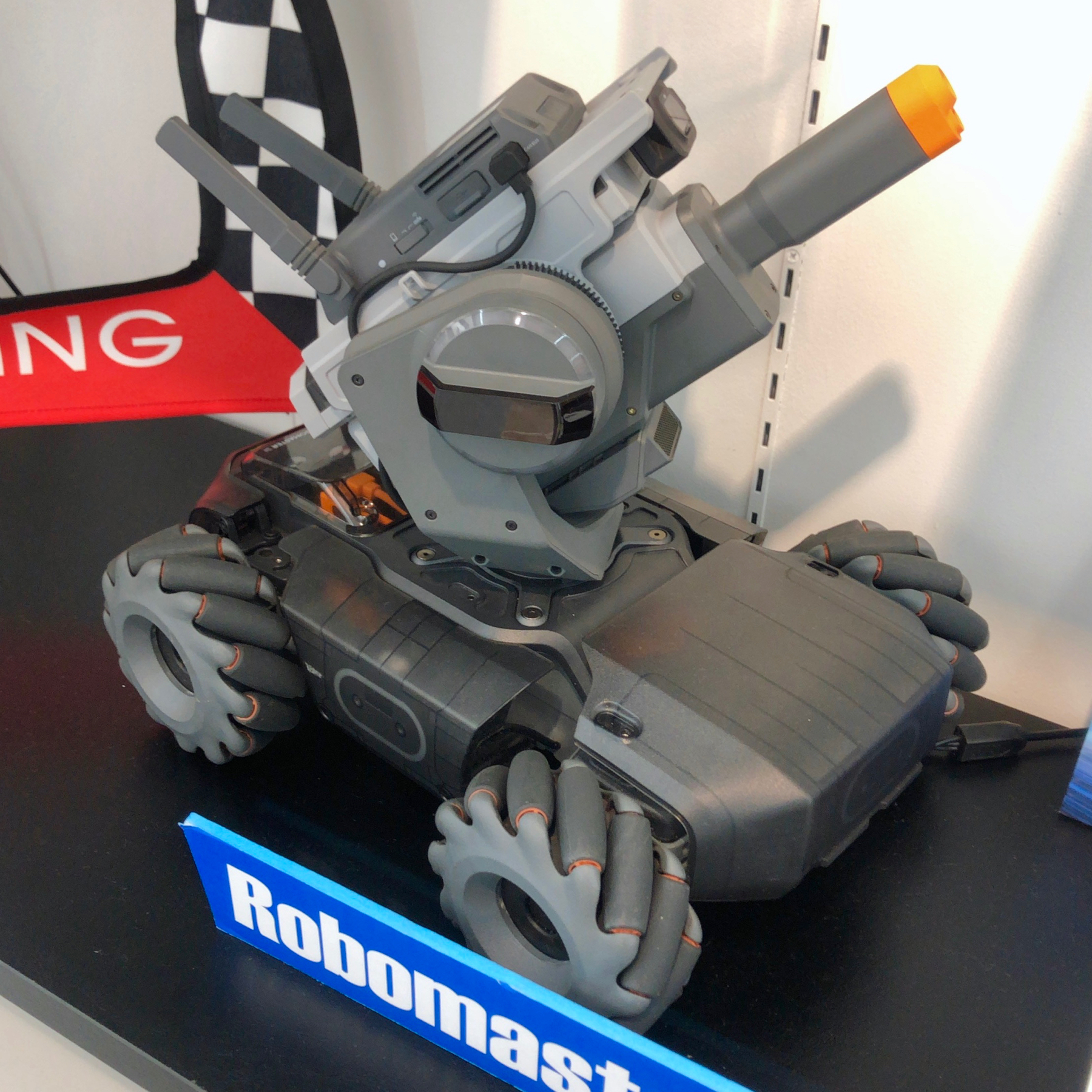
DJI RoboMaster S1

On 11 June 2019, DJI unveiled the RoboMaster S1 (机甲大师 S1), its first consumer ground drone, named after DJI's annual RoboMaster robot combat competition, of which it is now an unofficial mascot. The S1 is a tank-like rover remotely controlled in first-person view via Wi-Fi and an app on Microsoft Windows, Apple iOS or Google Android mobile devices. Designed to be an "advanced educational robot", the user has to assemble the S1 out of the box from loose parts and learn to program its AI functionality. Both Scratch and Python are programming languages employed by DJI along with app learning modules to teach the end user how to code.

==== RoboMaster EP ====
The DJI RoboMaster EP (机甲大师 EP) was officially released on March 9, 2020, although it was first teased in a YouTube RoboMaster S1 commercial on November 25, 2019. The EP supports more than 20 third-party sensors and open-source hardware such as Micro Bit, Arduino and Raspberry Pi.

== Controversies ==
=== United States ===
The company has been designated as a "Chinese Military Company" and sanctioned by the United States government, but its drones can still be purchased and operated in the country.

==== Privacy and security concerns ====
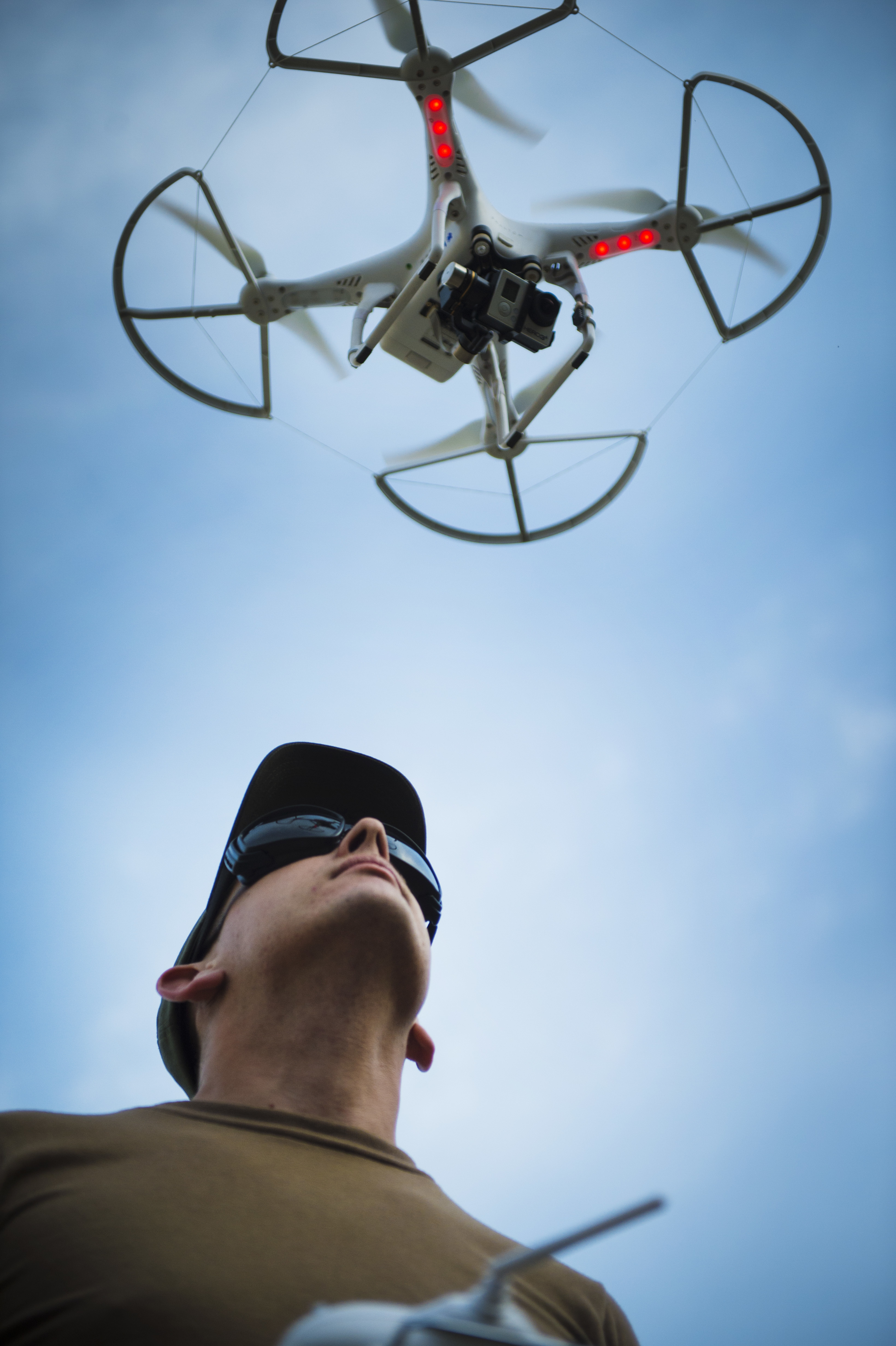
US Navy combat cameraman training to operate a DJI Phantom 2 drone in 2015

The United States Department of the Interior's Office of Aviation Services said in their analysis in July 2017 that DJI's software did not meet their information-sharing requirements. Later, DJI added Local Data Mode, which allows its drones to fly offline without transferring data over the internet.

The Register reported in August 2017 that the DJI GO app contained the JSPatch framework, which allowed DJI to hot-patch the app without triggering a review by Apple, or without first seeking user consent. This was against Apple's rules, and 45,000 apps were blocked from the App Store because of "hot patching concerns". In August, the United States Army also changed its internal guidance on disallowing the use of DJI products, especially in battlefield scenarios. Guidance was based on an Army Research Laboratory report from May 2017, which found cyber vulnerabilities. The US Army's decision launched public research, where it was speculated that the decision was because the data link between the controller and the drone was vulnerable.

In 2017, DJI launched a bug bounty program, enlisting third-party and white hat hackers to find flaws, which was relatively novel for large organizations at the time. However, the DJI team did not properly set up rules regarding non-disclosure agreements and was overwhelmed with the reported issues. The ill-prepared program resulted in miscommunication between DJI and security researchers, such as Kevin Finisterre. Finisterre decided to turn down the $30,000 bounty and disclosed the security breach he found. In the breach, DJI accidentally published its SSL certificate on GitHub. The program ended in a public relations crisis, and led DJI to modify its terms and conditions for the bounty program.

In 2018, in response to the allegations of mishandling user data, DJI commissioned Kivu Consulting to make a larger analysis. Kivu found that only the DJI GO 4 app was connected to the Internet; it worked without an Internet connection and only uploaded data after user confirmation. It also used servers that were located in the US, except for the crash reporting app called Bugly, which uploaded crash reports to a server located in China.

In January 2020, the United States Department of the Interior (DOI) announced that it would be grounding around 800 DJI drones over security concerns, which it had been using for wildlife conservation and infrastructure monitoring purposes. In May 2020, River Loop Security claimed DJI's Mimo app for controlling Osmo gimbals, had security concerns for users and policy-makers. These claims were reiterated by Parrot SA when launching their new product. DJI countered the analysis, calling it "inaccurate, outdated, and sensationalized".

In July 2020, the two separate reports by Synacktiv and GRIMM suggested that the Android version of the DJI GO 4 had potential security vulnerabilities that allowed the collection of smartphone IMSI and IMEI numbers, as well as bypassing the Google Play Store. The app also integrated Weibo SDK, allowing the installation of Weibo-related third-party apps. Although researchers found no evidence that any information was collected and sent to China or any backdoor, these reports boosted the espionage allegations from the US government.

DJI responded that the report described "typical software concerns" and stated that there was no evidence of vulnerabilities being exploited before or records of unexpected data transmission on their product designed for government and professional customers. DJI also stated that the "forced update" function was required to comply with critical safety features like geofencing or altitude restrictions. The function was used to detect illegal modifications to the app and to reinstall the latest version directly from the official website to prevent hackers from overriding safety features. In the statement release, DJI also said Weibo SDK could only be proactively turned on by the user. Industry journalist Scott Simmie suggested that the Achilles' heel of DJI is its country of origin, and repeated unsubstantiated claims of its security vulnerabilities forced the company into a defensive posture. The author also noted that the concern of the Chinese government requesting data from DJI was theoretical, as there was no evidence of malicious activities found; Simmie, based on circumstantial evidence, further speculated a collective campaign targeting DJI was formed to deliberately damage the company's reputation.

A 2020 analysis by Booz Allen Hamilton reported that they did not find evidence of unauthorized data transfers to China. The various apps used backend servers located in the US. The only exception was the crash analytics, which connected to Chinese servers. In November 2020, senators Chris Coons, Rick Scott, and others criticized a decision by the United States Air Force to purchase DJI drones on security grounds. The prospect of a complete ban on DJI drones in the United States was controversial for many reasons. Primary concerns included disruption to the manufacturing ecosystem, delaying technology development, and causing humanitarian, policy, and ethics issues.

In March 2023, during a Senate Committee meeting, Florida state senator Jason Pizzo accused Blue sUAS, a government program, and Florida Department of Management Services Secretary Pedro Allende of accepting aggressive lobbying from Skydio and limiting DJI from market competition despite no proven evidence of DJI drones sending data to any unknown source while in operation. In February 2024, reports found Skydio, BRINC Drones, and the Association for Uncrewed Vehicle Systems International paid lobbying efforts to the United States government to establish legislation for banning DJI.

In April 2024, DJI launched a Trust Center that publishes updates on third-party audits and certifications, along with information on security measures and privacy controls implemented in its drones. In May 2024, concerns were raised about DJI designs, parts, and software being licensed to Anzu Robotics, a drone company based in Texas. In August 2024, the United States House Select Committee on Strategic Competition between the United States and the Chinese Communist Party began a probe into Anzu Robotics, calling Anzu a "passthrough company" used to "avoid current and anticipated U.S. restrictions on DJI products". In September 2024, DJI denied the allegations and stated that Anzu Robotics is not affiliated with the company, and their relationship is limited to a standard technology licensing agreement. In February 2026, Texas attorney general Ken Paxton filed a lawsuit against Anzu Robotics, alleging that it illegally sells rebranded DJI products.

In September 2024, the United States Government Accountability Office (GAO) reported that restrictions on the use of DJI drones negatively impacted the Department of Interior's operations as well as those of its partners, such as the National Oceanic and Atmospheric Administration (NOAA) and academic institutions, which have different compliance policies. The DOI did not ban the use of existing DJI drones for emergency flights, such as managing wildfires, and expanded this allowance to include nonemergency use after determining the security risks were sufficiently low. As of June 2024, procuring new DJI drones was still prohibited except for wildfire management and search and rescue purposes.

A 2024 analysis by FTI Consulting supports the conclusion that "all first-party data transmissions, or transmissions to DJI owned infrastructure, resided within the United States." The report says that DJI employs certificate pinning and Transport Layer Security (TLS) to secure data streams. Its Restricted Network Mode (RNM) and Local Data Mode (LDM) reduced or eliminated information sharing over the network. In January 2025, DJI released an update that permitted its products to fly over previously restricted areas such as military bases, runways, or power plants.

==== US sanctions ====
In December 2020, the United States Department of Commerce added DJI to the Bureau of Industry and Security's Entity List. In January 2021, President Trump signed an executive order mandating the removal of Chinese-made drones from U.S. government fleets. In December 2021, the United States Department of the Treasury prohibited investment in DJI by US individuals and entities, accusing the company of assisting the People's Liberation Army and being complicit in aiding the persecution of Uyghurs.

In October 2022, the United States Department of Defense added DJI to a list of "Chinese military companies" operating in the U.S. In October 2024, DJI filed a lawsuit against the U.S. Department of Defense in an attempt to have the designation removed, arguing that it "is neither owned nor controlled by the Chinese military." In September 2025, DJI lost the lawsuit. The court ruled that the Defense Department had substantial evidence supporting its finding that DJI contributes to the "Chinese defense industrial base."

In 2023, DJI enlisted lobbying firms Subject Matter (who later changed their name to Avoq), Vogel Group, and CLS Strategies to address U.S. restrictions and challenges. Amid debates on Chinese client representation, Vogel Group and Avoq ceased representation in February 2024, while CLS Strategies continued to advocate for DJI. Law firms Sidley Austin and Porter Wright Morris & Arthur, along with Liberty Government Affairs led by Brian Darling, also supported DJI in lobbying efforts.

In September 2024, the U.S. House of Representatives passed the Countering CCP Drones Act. The legislation pending in the U.S. Senate aims to include DJI on a list maintained by the Federal Communications Commission (FCC) under the Secure and Trusted Communications Networks Act of 2019. This action would effectively prevent DJI's drones from operating on U.S. communications infrastructure, making them unusable in the country. DJI denounced what it termed "inaccurate and unsubstantiated allegations".

In October 2024, it was reported that the U.S. Customs and Border Protection was stopping the import of certain DJI drones into the U.S. under the Uyghur Forced Labor Prevention Act. In December 2025, the FCC banned the import, marketing, and sale of new DJI and Autel Robotics drone models in the U.S., though models already approved by the FCC up to that point were excluded from the ban.

==== Pentagon analysis ====
In May 2021, the United States Department of Defense issued an analysis of DJI products. The unclassified portion of the report concluded that two types of drone in the DJI "Government Edition" line-up show "no malicious code or intent and are recommended for use by government entities and forces working with US services." This is according to a summary obtained by The Hill, though the Defense Department did not respond to an inquiry asking for elaboration.

=== Incidents involving DJI products ===
In January 2015, a Phantom FC40 drone crashed into the White House's south lawn, in Washington, D.C., US. DJI later set up a no-fly Geo-system according to prohibited airspace, and forced all drones to update the firmware. The system introduced prevents flights from getting closer to, or to take off from restricted zones, based on GPS location. In the 2015 Tokyo drone incident, a DJI Phantom 2 drone carrying radioactive material landed on the official residence of the Prime Minister of Japan. Subsequently, the National Diet passed a law restricting drone flights near government buildings and nuclear sites.

In 2016, ISIS used DJI drones as exploding devices in Iraq. DJI later created a broad no-fly zone over nearly all of Iraq and Syria. That year, a DJI drone was nearly involved in a midair collision with a Chinese fighter jet. The Chinese government subsequently insisted that DJI develop an air traffic registry to track its drones within China. On 30 March 2018, Israel Defense Forces used DJI's Matrice 600 drones to drop tear gas from above on Gazan protestors. On 4 August 2018, two Matrice 600 drones detonated explosives near Avenida Bolívar, Caracas in an apparent attempt to assassinate Venezuelan president Nicolás Maduro.

==== Russian invasion of Ukraine ====
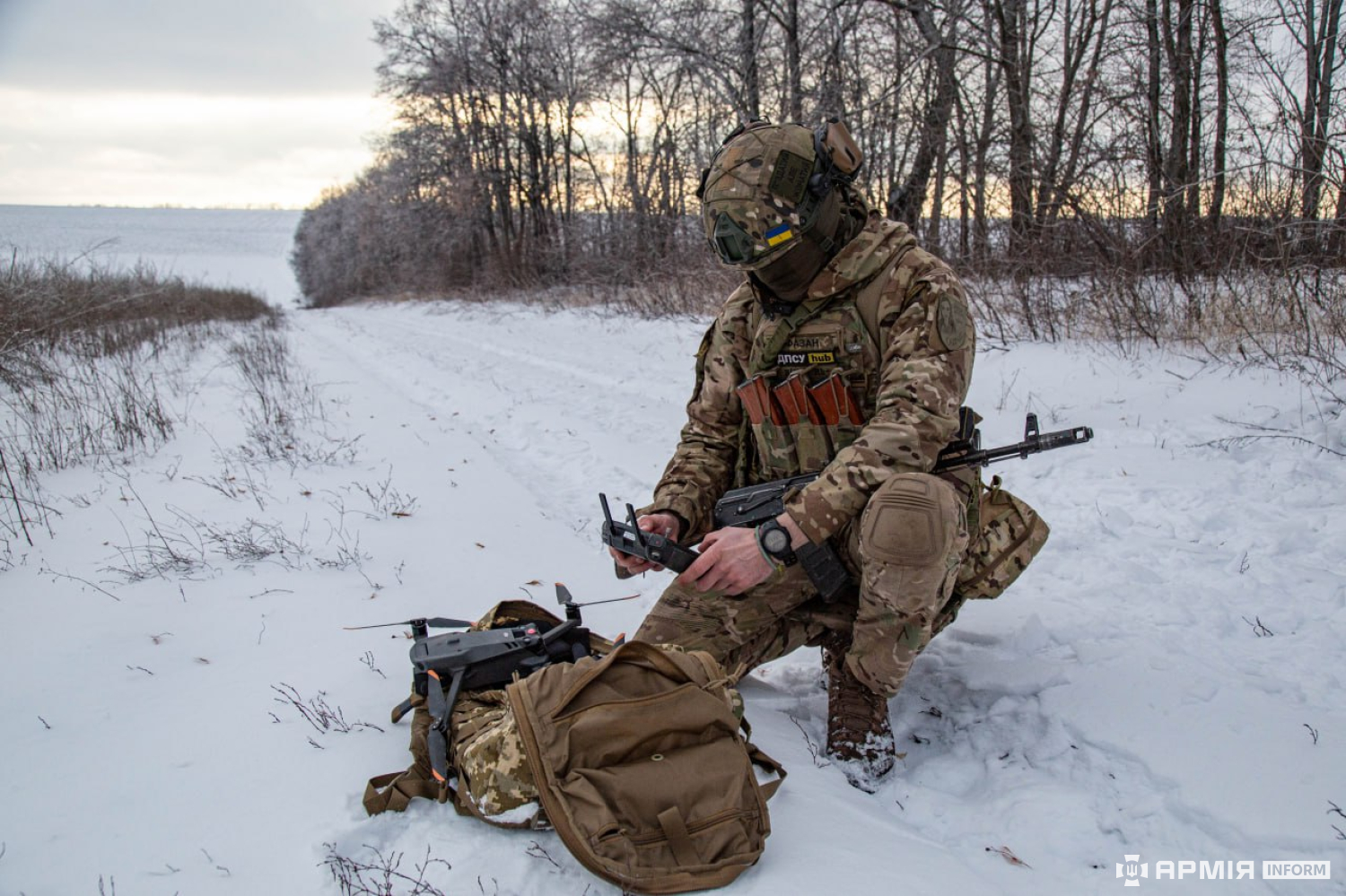
Ukrainian drone operator controlling a DJI Mavic drone

DJI drones have been used by both Ukraine and Russia during the Russian invasion of Ukraine. They have served as a tactical surveillance, strike, and propaganda tool by Ukraine's armed forces. According to the investigation by Faine Greenwood of the Foreign Policy, DJI drones are sourced by governments, hobbyists, international donations to Ukraine and Russia to support each side on the battlefield, and were often flown by drone hobbyists recruited by the armed forces. The prevalence of DJI drones was attributable to their market dominance, affordability, high performance, and reliability. They were also preferred for their commercial availability.

Ukraine has used DJI drones extensively after being invaded, while battlefield footage suggests their usage by Russia as well. After German retailer MediaMarkt stopped selling DJI drones, DJI said that its products were for civilian use and inappropriate for the military. Following criticism of the company's operation in Russia, DJI suspended its business in both Russia and Ukraine to prevent its products from being used in combat. However, donors and buyers from both Russia and Ukraine shipped the drones across the border via intermediates and modified their software to circumnavigate the restrictions.

Ukrainian troops have used DJI drones to conduct reconnaissance, drop improvised explosives, and conduct precision strikes on Russian forces. Fitted with high-definition cameras, Ukrainian military also used the DJI drones to produce effective propaganda materials, including live war footage of Russian forces and heavy equipment being destroyed.

In May 2022, Ukrainian Vice Prime Minister Mykhailo Fedorov said AeroScope detection platform gave Russian forces ability to track Ukrainian drones and gave Russia advantage, and asked DJI to impose no-fly zones over parts of Ukraine. DJI replied saying that its drones are designed for civilians and inappropriate for military use because of visibility features such as AeroScope and Remote ID. It could try to ban them from certain airspaces under a formal request from the Ukrainian government, but doing so would affect all parties' drones being flown there and could be countered by operators preventing their drones from receiving updates. The Verge did not find any confirmed reports on Russian AeroScope usage and interviewed a DJI spokesperson to clarify the issue.

Ukraine continued to purchase DJI drones for its military. In October 2023, the Ukrainian government announced the purchase of 4,000 DJI drones and the plan to purchase 20,000 DJI drones by May 2024. In Ukraine, DJI drones and small UAVs became a ubiquitous and critical part of the war.

==== Gaza war ====
According to an investigation by Al Jazeera, the Israeli military utilized retrofitted DJI drones, especially its Agras model, in the Gaza war to attack civilian shelters and hospitals, as well as monitoring Palestinian prisoners of war being used as human shields. The Israel Defense Forces used several DJI models such as the Agras, Avata, and Mavic during the war for various purposes, including surveillance and dropping bombs. Unlike its actions during the Russian invasion of Ukraine, DJI has yet to halt the sales of DJI drones to the Israeli military.

==== Mount Everest ====
In April 2024, DJI donated two drones to Airlift Technologies in order to help the Sagarmantha Pollution Control Committee's cleanup of Mount Everest. The mountaineering industry on Everest had been exploring uses for drones such as geography mapping, equipment transport, and search and rescue, which historically has been performed by Sherpas. In April 2025, DJI performed what was reported as the highest altitude delivery test to date when it successfully delivered loads weighing 15 kg to Camp I (6130 meters elevation) while flying −25 °C temperatures and 45 km/h winds. The Nepalese government approved the use of DJI's heavy lift drones on the mountain the following December.

On April 30, 2026, the Home Ministry of Nepal canceled the flight permit for DJI's FlyCart 100 (Category D) drone and rejected Airlift's application to use an American drone, the FreeFly Alta X Gen 2. The ministry cited security concerns, with an official with the ministry stating that heightened sensitivity over the drones' countries of origin played an influential role in the decision. But a retired Nepali army major general claimed the decision was "an effort to maintain strategic neutrality." Days after the ban went into effect, a large serac collapsed in the Khumbu Icefall, stranding and injuring climbers. Due to the permit issue, the rescue took place without the help of the drones. Following the protest from Mount Everest expedition operators, the official quickly resumed the flight of DJI drones.

== See also ==
- List of quadcopters
- List of unmanned aerial vehicles of China
- List of Chinese companies
