= Frank Wang =

Founder of DJI (born 1980)

- 汪滔
- Born: Wang Tao; 1980 (age 45–46); Hangzhou, Zhejiang, China
- Education: Hong Kong University of Science and Technology (BE, MPhil)
- Occupations: Aerospace engineer, businessman
- Known for: Founder and CEO of DJI

Wang Tao (Chinese: 汪滔; pinyin: Wāng Tāo; born 1980), better known as Frank Wang, is a Chinese aerospace engineer and businessman. He is the founder and CEO of the Shenzhen-based technology company DJI, the world's largest manufacturer of commercial drones. As of December 2020, he has a net worth of US$4.8 billion.

== Overview ==
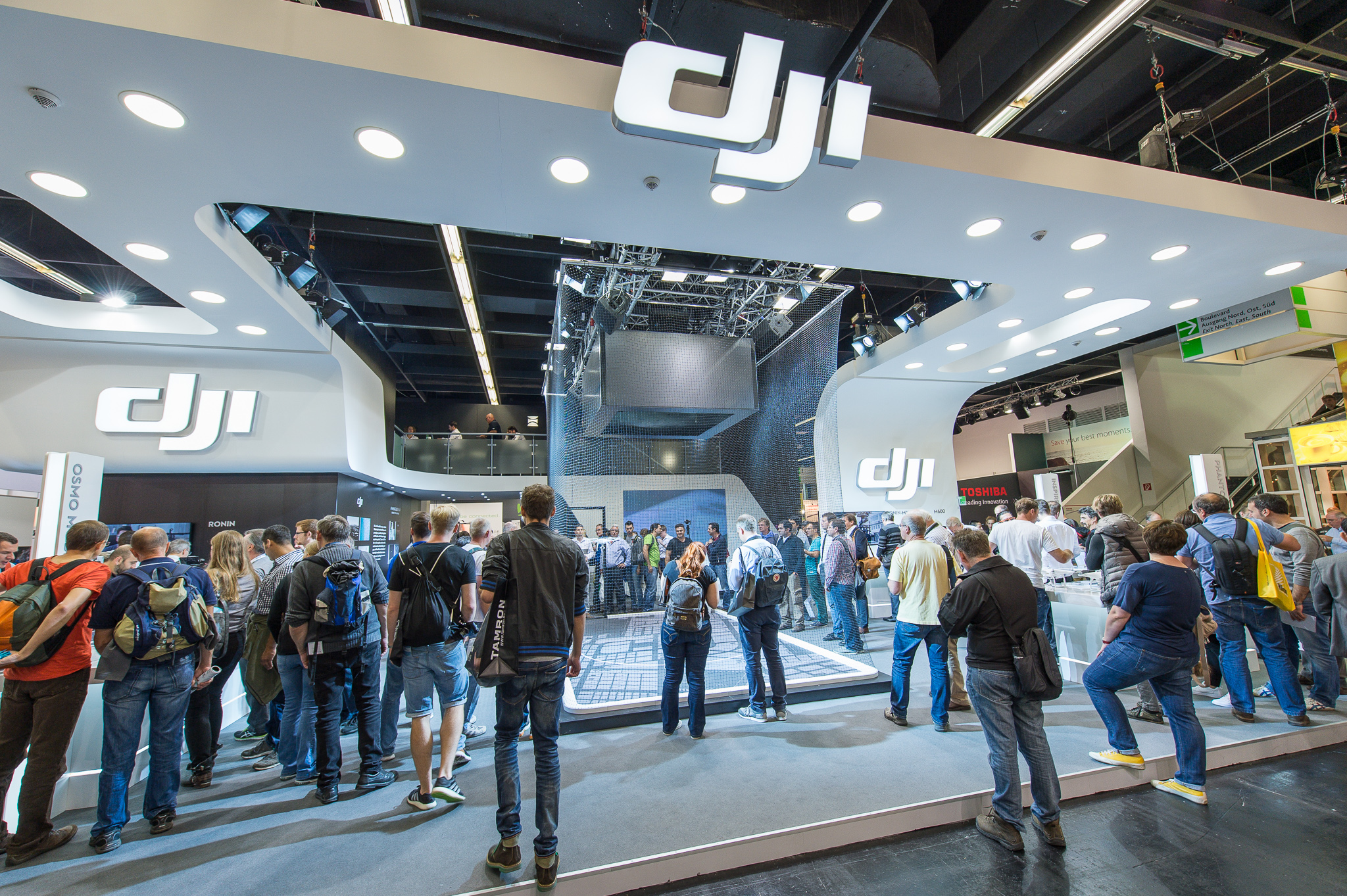
2016 photo of DJI retail outlet in shopping mall

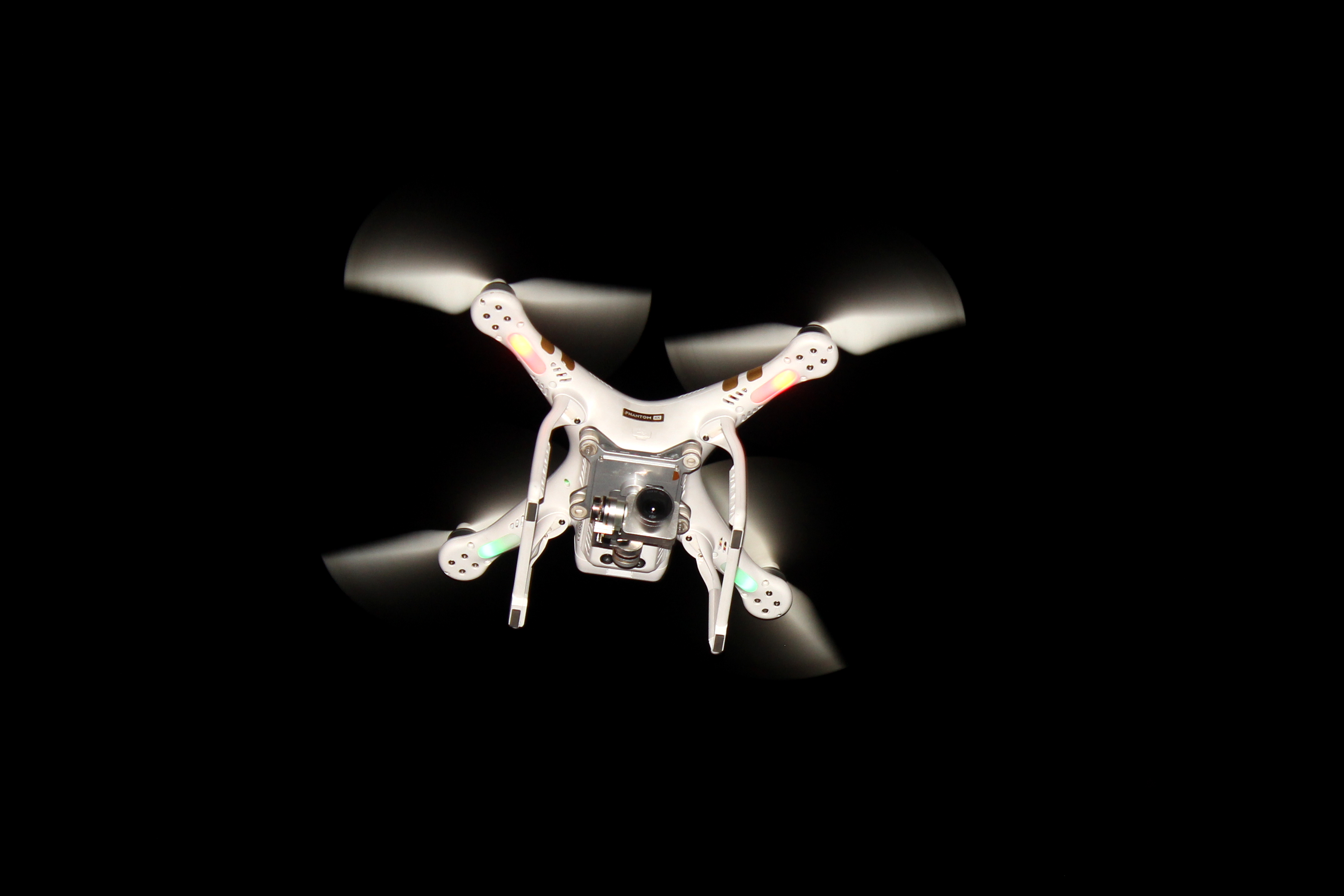
DJI Phantom 4K drone in action

Wang was born in Hangzhou, Zhejiang province. He showed an interest in flight and airborne devices from a young age, but received mediocre grades as a schoolchild. He attended the Hong Kong University of Science & Technology (HKUST) for college, and drew the attention of math professor Li Zexiang (李泽湘) following an impressive performance on a class project to build a helicopter flight control system. Li subsequently brought Wang into the school's graduate program.

In 2005, Wang participated in ABU Robocon and his HKUST team won third prize among teams competing from across Asia. HKUST granted him HK$18,000 (US$2,300) to conduct research and develop a drone.

Wang built the first prototypes of DJI's projects in his dorm room, selling the flight control components to universities and Chinese electric companies. He used the proceeds to move to the industrial hub of Shenzhen and hired a small staff in 2006. The company struggled at first, with a high degree of churn among employees that has been attributed to Wang's abrasive personality and perfectionist expectations of his employees. The company sold a modest amount of components during this period, relying as well on financial support from Wang's family friend, Lu Di, who provided US$90,000 and managed the company's finances.

In 2010, Wang hired a high school friend, Swift Xie Jia, to run the company's marketing. DJI began to cater more to drone hobbyists in markets outside of China. In 2011, Wang met the former television game-show contestant Colin Guinn at a trade show, and the two of them would found DJI North America, a subsidiary company focusing on mass market drone sales. In the same year he defended his MPhil thesis, "Control systems for autonomous helicopters".

In 2013, DJI released the first model of the Phantom drone, an entry-level drone which was significantly more user-friendly than any other drone on the market at the time. The Phantom was a worldwide commercial success, but this success led to conflict between Guinn and Wang. Midway through the year, Wang made an offer to buy Guinn out, which Guinn refused. By the end of the year, DJI had locked all employees of the North American subsidiary out of their email accounts and was well on its way to shutting down the subsidiary's operations. Guinn sued DJI, and the case was settled out of court.

In 2015, DJI eclipsed the success of the Phantom with the release of the Phantom 3, whose even greater popularity was in part due to the addition of a built in live-streaming camera. DJI became the largest consumer drone company in the world, driving many of its competitors out of the market over the following years. In 2017, Wang became Asia's youngest tech billionaire. By 2020, DJI held nearly 77% of the US market share for consumer drones, with no other company holding more than 4%.

In 2016, Frank Wang was ranked #96 on The Creators business visionaries list by Business Insider for his contribution in kickstarting the consumer drone market with DJI. He was named the first "drone billionaire" by Forbes.

In 2020, Wang became a laureate of the Asian Scientist 100 by the Asian Scientist.

== Early life and education ==
Frank Wang was born in 1980 in Hangzhou, Zhejiang Province. He was the son of “a teacher turned small-business owner and an engineer father.” As a child, Wang “spent most of his time reading about model airplanes, a pastime that offered more comfort than his middling grades,” and dreamed of owning his own “‘fairy,’ a device that could fly and follow him with a camera.”

Speaking about when his interest in flying robots first emerged, Frank Wang referenced a comic book in the 1980s called “Dong Naojin Yeye” 动脑筋爷爷 (Grandpa Think-Hard) which featured a red helicopter. Wang explains in an interview, “I remember it so clearly, … I imagined that I’d make a plane like that, that could follow me when I’m hiking or on the train, and use a camera to send the images to me.” At age 16, his parents bought him a toy plane, which he crashed immediately, an early setback that reinforced his fascination with flight.

During high school, Wang met Swift Xie Jia, who would later play a significant role in the development of DJI. Xie joined the company in 2010 to run marketing and act as a confidant; he later sold his apartment to invest in DJI and became one of its largest individual shareholders.

Wang initially enrolled at East China Normal University (ECNU) to study electrical engineering, but dropped out shortly after to reapply to different universities. After facing rejections from his top choices like Massachusetts Institute of Technology and Stanford University, he was later accepted into the Electronic and Computer Engineering program at the Hong Kong University of Science and Technology (HKUST). Reflecting on his studies, Wang said, “At HKUST I took an electronics course that gave me the fundamental knowledge to build autonomously controlled flying machines.”

In 2005, Wang and his team competed in the ABU Robocon competition, winning third prize among teams from across Asia. For his 2005 graduation thesis, rather than selecting a faculty-provided topic, he proposed building an easy-to-use control system for model helicopters.

Wang and two other classmates ultimately received HK$18,000 in funding. On presentation day, however, the helicopter failed to stabilize and crashed, and Wang received a C for the project. He later recalled that he “devoted everything to his final group project, skipping classes and staying up until 5 a.m.”

Wang’s dedication to the project drew the attention of robotics professor Li Zexiang. Li noted Wang’s leadership and technical understanding and admitted him into HKUST’s graduate program, emphasizing that Wang’s poor academic performance was not reflective of his excellence in practical work.

== Founding and early years at DJI ==
After graduation from HKUST, Wang and his team continued refining the flight-control system and by early 2006 had achieved stable flight and landing. He posted the results on a model airplane forum, offering the system for 50,000 yuan; to his surprise, buyers were willing to pay, even though production costs were significantly lower. Seeing a business opportunity, Wang founded DJI in 2006 with two teammates.

He initially built flight controller prototypes out of his HKUST dorm room. Later that year, Wang and his co-founders moved to Shenzhen, renting a small apartment and funding the venture with remaining scholarship money and family support.

DJI began by selling $6,000 flight-control components to clients including Chinese universities and state-owned power companies, which incorporated them into do-it-yourself drones. “I didn't know how big the market could be,” Wang later said. “Our idea was to just make the product, feed 10 to 20 people and have a team.”

The company initially focused on drone parts such as autopilot systems and gimbals, while aiming to build a complete, ready-to-fly drone. The company sold a modest amount of components during this period, relying as well on financial support from Wang's family friend, Lu Di, who provided US$90,000 and managed the company's finances.

The company struggled during these early years, with a high degree of churn among employees that has been attributed to Wang's abrasive personality and perfectionist expectations of his employees. After two years most of the initial founding team had left the company. Additionally, during this time, an early employee attempted to steal DJI’s intellectual property and sell it to competitors. Wang wanted to sue but couldn’t afford the 70,000 CNY legal fees. Ultimately, Professor Li helped Wang settle the lawsuit and fundraise an additional 1 million CNY in capital to support the company. Li then joined DJI as its chairman.

In 2009, Wang’s team at DJI released the XP3.1 flight control system. A demo they released capturing drone footage of the peak of Mount Everest proved meaningful validation, leading to consistent demand of their XP3.1 system. This product launched DJI into the global spotlight.

== Growth and expansion of DJI ==
In 2010, Wang hired a high school friend, Swift Xie Jia, to run the company's marketing. DJI began to cater more to drone hobbyists in markets outside of China. In 2011, Wang met the former television game-show contestant Colin Guinn at a trade show, and the two of them would found DJI North America, a subsidiary company focusing on mass market drone sales. In the same year he defended his MPhil thesis, "Control systems for autonomous helicopters".

In 2013, DJI released the first model of the Phantom drone, an entry-level drone which was significantly more user-friendly than any other drone on the market at the time. Wang was surprised by the level of demand that the Phantom demonstrated–as a result, DJI shifted to also focus their efforts on developing high quality, affordable consumer drones.

Phantom was a worldwide commercial success, but this success led to conflict between Guinn and Wang. Midway through the year, Wang made an offer to buy Guinn out, which Guinn refused. By the end of the year, DJI had locked all employees of the North American subsidiary out of their email accounts and was well on its way to shutting down the subsidiary's operations. Guinn sued DJI, and the case was settled out of court.

By 2015, DJI’s revenue surpassed one billion dollars. In 2015, DJI eclipsed the success of the Phantom with the release of the Phantom 3, whose even greater popularity was in part due to the addition of a built in live-streaming camera. Drone products that followed, including the Mavic Pro (2016) which had a more compact, foldable design, and the Mavic Mini (2019), which was light enough to bypass many legal restrictions surrounding drone weight, helped expand DJI’s market reach, and caused Wang in 2017 to became Asia's youngest tech billionaire.

During these years, DJI became the largest consumer drone company in the world, driving many of its competitors out of the market. By 2020, DJI held nearly 77% of the US market share for consumer drones, with no other company holding more than 4%.

== Security challenges ==
Despite Wang’s success with DJI, the company has experienced several challenges in recent years. In December 2020, the U.S. Department of Commerce cited a group of firms including DJI as “enabl[ing] wide-scale human rights abuses within China…and/or facilitat[ing] the export of items by China that aid repressive regimes around the world,” and in December 2021 the government further limited DJI’s trading and financial capabilities, similarly citing its alleged role in Chinese surveillance efforts.

In February 2022, DJI’s claims denying financial support from the Chinese government were challenged by reports that found evidence of Chinese procurement orders. The firm was blacklisted by the Pentagon in October 2022 for alleged connections to the Chinese military, though DJI denied military involvement. By 2022 and following multiple DJI scandals, Wang lost roughly one quarter of his wealth.

Wang’s company continued to deny military involvement in a court challenge to the Defense Department’s blacklisting but lost the case in September 2025. DJI was also blacklisted by the Federal Communications Commission but has protested this classification by appealing in the court system in February 2026.

In 2022, Wang was contacted by former Ukrainian Vice Prime Minister Mykhailo Fedorov, who claimed DJI products were assisting Russia’s military campaign and asked for DJI to share information about and restrict their use. Wang’s company said it did not intend any military involvement, and it proposed minimizing DJI drone activity in Ukraine through the use of a geofence; DJI subsequently ceased sales in both Russia and Ukraine in April 2022.

== Accomplishments and accolades ==
DJI’s scale under Frank Wang has been described in both market-share estimates and public-sector usage. In 2015, Reuters reported that DJI held “about 70 percent of the commercial market worldwide,” and that it generated nearly $500 million in revenue in 2014. The same article described DJI as having established “a strong early lead in the U.S. commercial market.” Subsequent reporting continued to describe DJI’s scale in global markets. In 2018, an Institute of Electrical and Electronics Engineers article stated that DJI had no real competitor in the personal-use, nonmilitary drone market. In 2021, Reuters reported that the company had a “near-80% market share in consumer drones last year in the United States.”

In 2016, Frank Wang was ranked #96 on The Creators business visionaries list by Business Insider for his contribution in kickstarting the consumer drone market with DJI. He was named the first "drone billionaire" by Forbes.

In 2019, Wang and Li Zexiang were recipients of the IEEE Robotics and Automation Award, which recognizes “contributions in the field of robotics and automation.”

In 2020, Wang became a laureate of the Asian Scientist 100 by the Asian Scientist.

In October 2022, Bloomberg described DJI as “the world's largest manufacturer of consumer drones.” The article also referred estimated his net worth at $3.4 billion. By then, over 500 law enforcement agencies across the United States used DJI aircraft for tasks including searches and scene documentation.

== Availability and expansion across sectors ==
Coverage of DJI’s consumer products has emphasized how their packaged stabilization and navigation features broadened access to aerial photography. Consumer magazine Popular Mechanics described the Phantom drone series as “the first gyro-stabilized quadcopter with GPS that came in a nice, pre-assembled package,” contrasting it with earlier quadcopter that were “extremely difficult to control.” Coverage of the company has emphasized how this accessibility helped push drones into routine commercial workflows, from filmmaking to mapping. In 2015, the company also expanded into agriculture with a drone designed “specifically for spraying crops”. Magazine DroneLife reported that DJI had treated over 500 million hectares and saved approximately 222 million tons of water by the end of 2024.
