= 2015 Tokyo drone incident =

Anti-nuclear protest in Japan

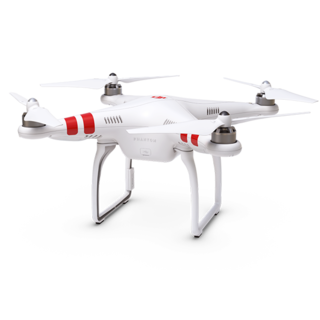
A Phantom 2 drone

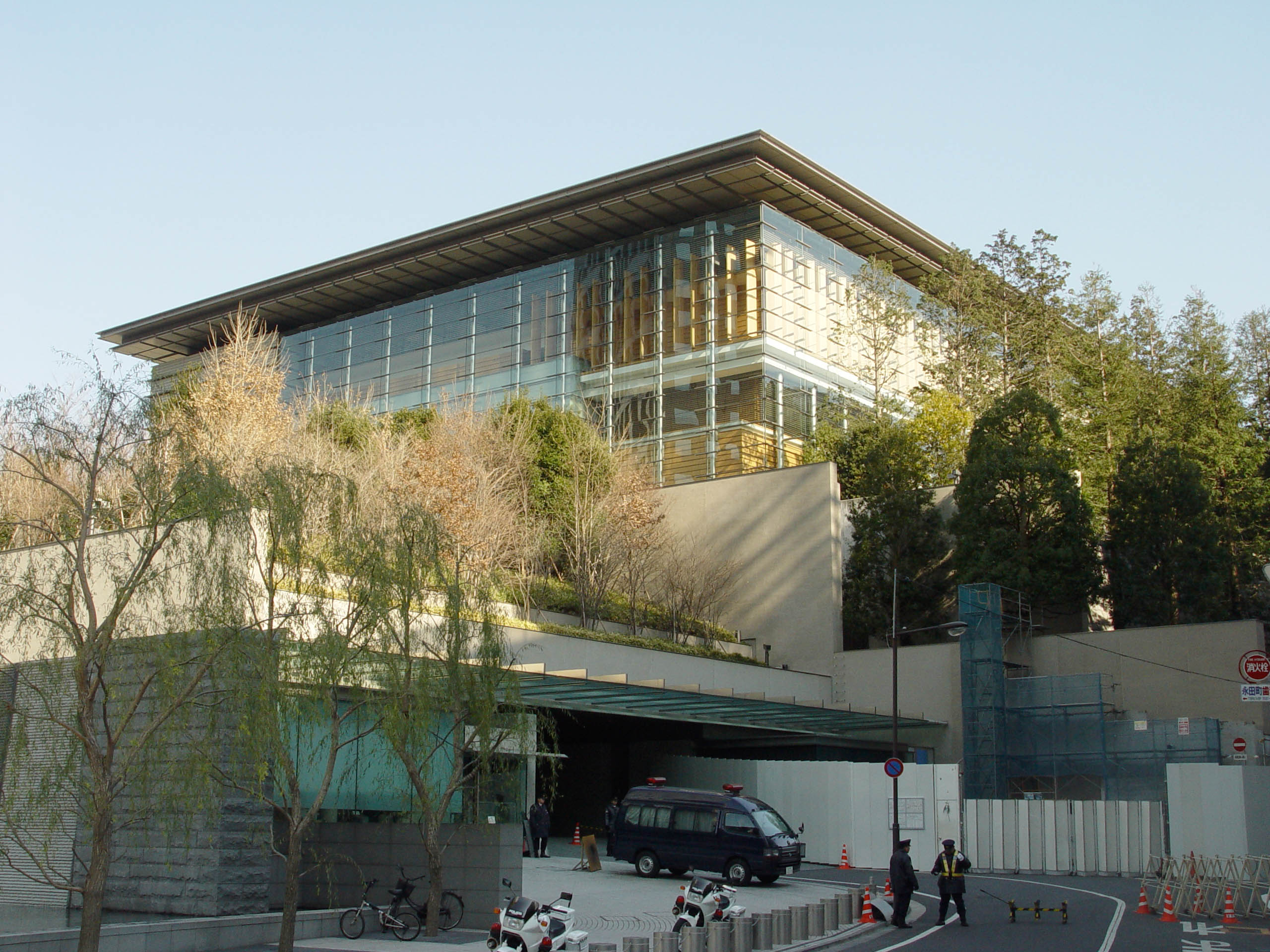
Japanese Prime Minister's Official Residence

In the 2015 Tokyo drone incident (首相官邸無人機落下事件, Sushōkantei mujinki rakka jiken), a Phantom 2 drone carrying traces of radiation was found on the roof of the Japanese Prime Minister's Official Residence. It had been controlled by Yasuo Yamamoto, an anti-nuclear protester from Fukui Prefecture. Yamamoto flew the drone there carrying sand containing caesium from Fukushima prefecture on April 9, but the drone was not discovered until April 22.

This caused substantial embarrassment to the authorities, both for the security breach and for the delayed discovery of the drone. Yamamoto was later given a two-year suspended sentence, and the incident led to wide-reaching changes to regulations on drones in Japan. This along with other incidents led to authorities in Japan becoming much more aware of issues related to drones.

== Yasuo Yamamoto ==
Yasuo Yamamoto was an unemployed 40-year-old man from Fukui prefecture and former Japan Air Self-Defense Force enlistee, residing in Obama, Fukui. Fukui prefecture is home to 13 of Japan's 48 operational nuclear reactors, and in 2014, the reactivation of Japan's nuclear reactors, idled after the 2011 Tōhoku earthquake and tsunami and subsequent Fukushima Daiichi nuclear disaster was a serious topic of debate.

In July 2014, Yamamoto started a blog, which he called "Santa Kantei" (Santa at the Prime Minister's office). He referred to himself in one blog post as "a lone wolf" and in another post said “I will not hesitate to commit a terror act to stop restart (of nuclear reactors)”. In October 2014, he used a drone to observe the Sendai Nuclear Power Plant in Kagoshima prefecture, which was then due to be restarted.

In October 2014, he went to Fukushima to gather contaminated sand. Yamamoto considered various methods to draw attention to his cause, and considered landing a drone with the Fukushima sand at a US diplomatic housing facility. On December 24, when Japanese Prime Minister Shinzō Abe's new cabinet was launched, he had intended to do his flight to the PM's office from a nearby park, but did not do so as it was too stressful. In March 2015, he again visited Fukushima prefecture to gather contaminated sand.

== Drone flight ==
On April 7, 2015, Yamamoto left his home and travelled to Tokyo with his DJI Phantom 2 drone. The drones are sold only in white, but Yamamoto had painted his black, had painted over LEDs on it in black, and placed a radiation symbol sticker on it. On the following day he wished to fly his drone but the weather was poor, so he delayed it until the next day. On April 9 at 3:30am, he flew the drone from a parking lot located near the Prime Minister's office. He had planned to land it in front of the Prime Minister's office, but he lost control of it and it landed on the roof of the Prime Minister's office, which functions as a helipad.

After losing control of the drone, Yamamoto returned to Fukui and posted on his blog about how there were no reports about his drone. On April 18, he showed a picture of himself preparing a second drone.

=== Discovery ===
The drone was found by accident on April 22 by an official who was taking new employees on a tour of the building.

== Arrest and trial ==
After the drone was eventually found, Yamamoto turned himself in to the police on April 24 at the Obama police station and was arrested. The following day he was transported to Tokyo.

On February 16, 2016, the Tokyo District Court handed down a two-year sentence, suspended for four years and ordered the drone confiscated. Prosecutors had asked for a three-year jail sentence.

== Outcome ==
=== Changes to law ===
Before the incident drones were only prohibited near airports or in the flightpath of planes. The National Diet passed a law restricting drone flights near special sites such as the Prime Minister's office, Imperial Palace, Supreme Court and nuclear reactors. Violators would face a prison sentence of a year or a ¥500,000 fine. Paragliders would also be covered by the law.

In December 2015, changes to the Civil Aeronautics Law were passed through Japan's National Diet banned flights by drones weighing over 200 grams (7.1 oz) in crowded urban areas, altitudes of 150 meters (490 ft) or more, and near airports. Among other places, this meant that drones were banned in all of 23 central wards of Tokyo, although the Ministry of Transport can grant case by case exceptions.

=== Police countermeasures ===
After the incident Tokyo police investigated various options for counter-drone measures, and Japan's National Police Agency requested ¥400 million yen for anti-drone countermeasures. It planned to procure radar, cameras, and nets designed to capture drones.

The police planned to launch a drone interceptor squad, and by January 2016, the Tokyo police riot squad had acquired an interceptor drone to capture suspicious drones, and it was announced that they planned to acquire another 10 by February 2016. The 2016 Tokyo Marathon was the first event at which the police planned to use drones as part of the event's security, with several interceptor drones deployed.
