= DJI Osmo =

Brand of camcorder

DJI Osmo 灵眸

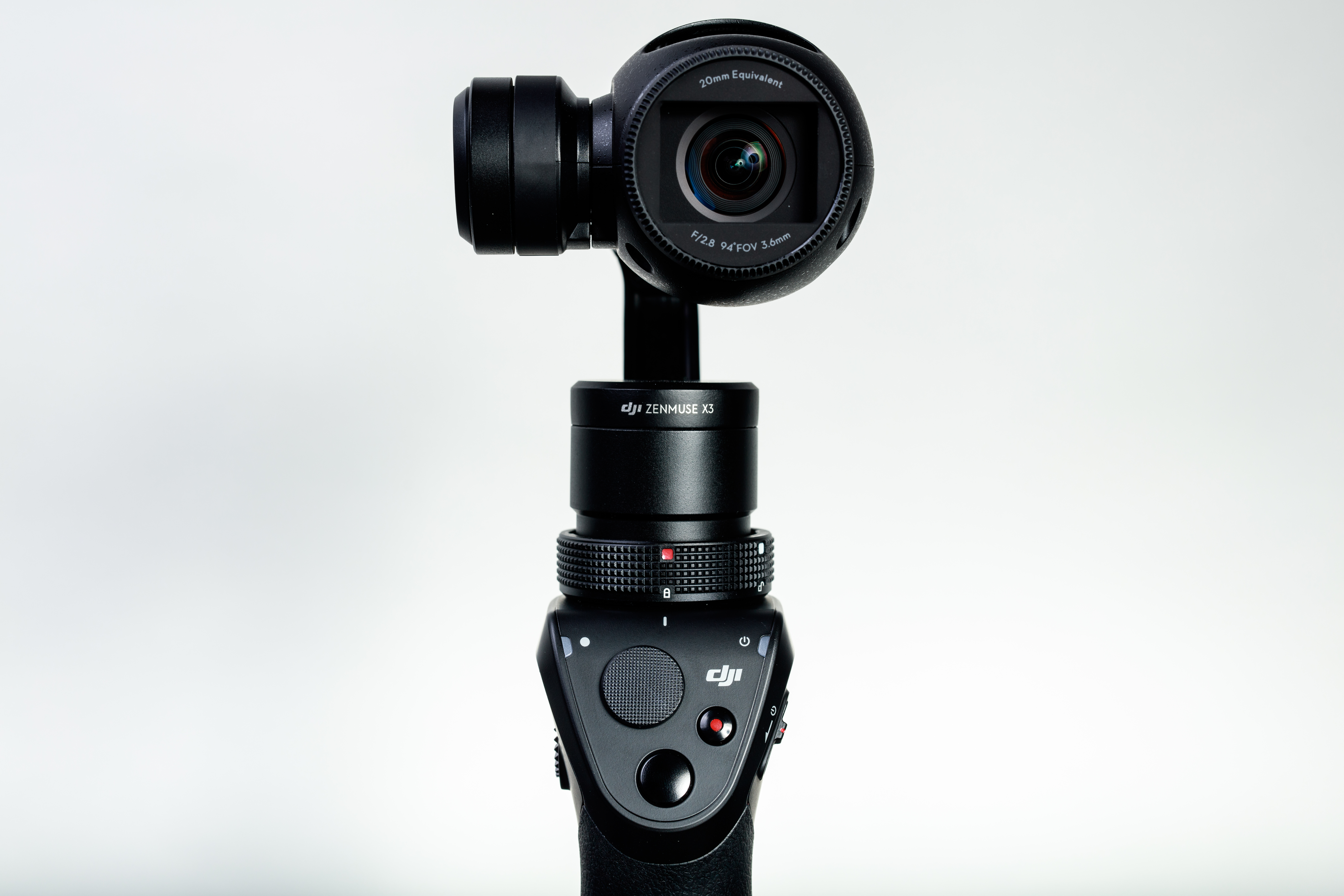
- Manufacturer: DJI
- Type: Camcorder
- Generation: 2
- Released: October 8, 2015; 10 years ago
- Media: FAT32 (≤32GB) *exFAT (>32GB)
- Storage: microSD (64GB max)
- Display: Smartphone via companion app
- Sound: Internal microphone; 3,5mm external jack
- Input: Joystick and buttons; WiFi connectivity
- Camera: Zenmuse X3 (4K, 12MP) *Zenmuse X5 (4K - 24/30fps, 16MP) *Zenmuse X5R (Lossless and RAW 4K - 30fps, 16MP)
- Power: Intelligent Battery (m. HB01-522365; LiPo 980 mAh)
- Dimensions: 61.8 mm × 48.2 mm × 161.5 mm (2.43 in × 1.90 in × 6.36 in) (Osmo) *116 mm × 30 mm × 34 mm (4.6 in × 1.2 in × 1.3 in) (Phone mount)
- Weight: 201 g (0.443 lb)
- Website: dji.com/osmo

The DJI Osmo (Chinese: 灵眸; pinyin: Líng Móu; stylized as DJI OSMO) is a line of compact camcorders manufactured by DJI. It is capable of shooting 4K UHD and 12-16 MP within a maximum of 64 GB microSD storage.

Unlike most camcorders, it incorporates a modular design, as it attaches camera gimbals to its base, which it uses to incorporate different file formats, such as lossless compression and RAW format with the Zenmuse (禅思) X5R gimbal. It is backwards compatible with the Inspire 1 UAV Zenmuse gimbal.

== Overview ==
The DJI Osmo is a camcorder, as it is only packaged with its handle, camera gimbal, and case. The interface of the camera is controlled through a smartphone app called "DJI Go", which is also used in some DJI Phantom drones.

== Specifications ==
=== Camera ===
The DJI Osmo uses a 12.4-megapixel Sony Exmor R CMOS 1/2.3" sensor with a 94 degree FOV and a f/2.8. It has an ISO range of 100-3200 for video and 100-1600 for still photos. The DJI Osmo can shoot in the following frame rates and resolutions:

UHD 4K (4096 x 2160) 24/25p

UHD 4K (3840 x 2160) 24/25/30p

2.7K (2704 x 1520) 24/25/30p

FHD: 1920 x 1080 24/25/30/48/50/60/120p

HD: 1280 x 720 24/25/30/48/50/60p

==== General ====
The DJI Osmo's handle itself weighs 201 g, and the handle is 61.8 mm × 48.2 mm × 161.5 mm dimensionally. (2.43 in × 1.9 in × 6.4 in) Controls are a record button, a joystick, and a trigger in the front. A power slider for turning on and off the camera is located in the right side of the handle. On the left side, a mount can be attached onto the camera.

==== Microphone ====
The camera is equipped with an internal microphone for audio recording, and a 3.5 mm jack placed near the trigger allows external microphones to be plugged in.

==== Camera gimbals ====
The DJI Osmo is compatible with four Zenmuse gimbal-cameras: the X3, X3 Zoom, X5, and X5R. The X3, which is packaged, can shoot up to 4K video and take 12MP stills. The X3 Zoom keeps the same X3 sensor but adds 3.5x optical zoom and 2x digital lossless zoom. The X5, can shoot 4K at 30fps, and can take 16 MP stills. The X5R, which is an upgraded version of the X5 gimbal, adds lossless compression and RAW format and is intended for professional use. However, the X5 and X5R require a separate adapter sold independently.

The gimbals, unless locked, are stabilized with three individual motors, keeping footage steady and stabilized without editing after. When not in use, the motors lock automatically, and can be unlocked manually during set-up and initialization.

=== Software ===
The DJI Osmo has no internal display, as a smartphone running either Android or iOS needs to have the companion app, "DJI Go". However, it can also operate independently, without external connection.
