= DJI Sky City =

Two-tower office complex in Shenzhen, Guangdong, China

- 大疆天空之城
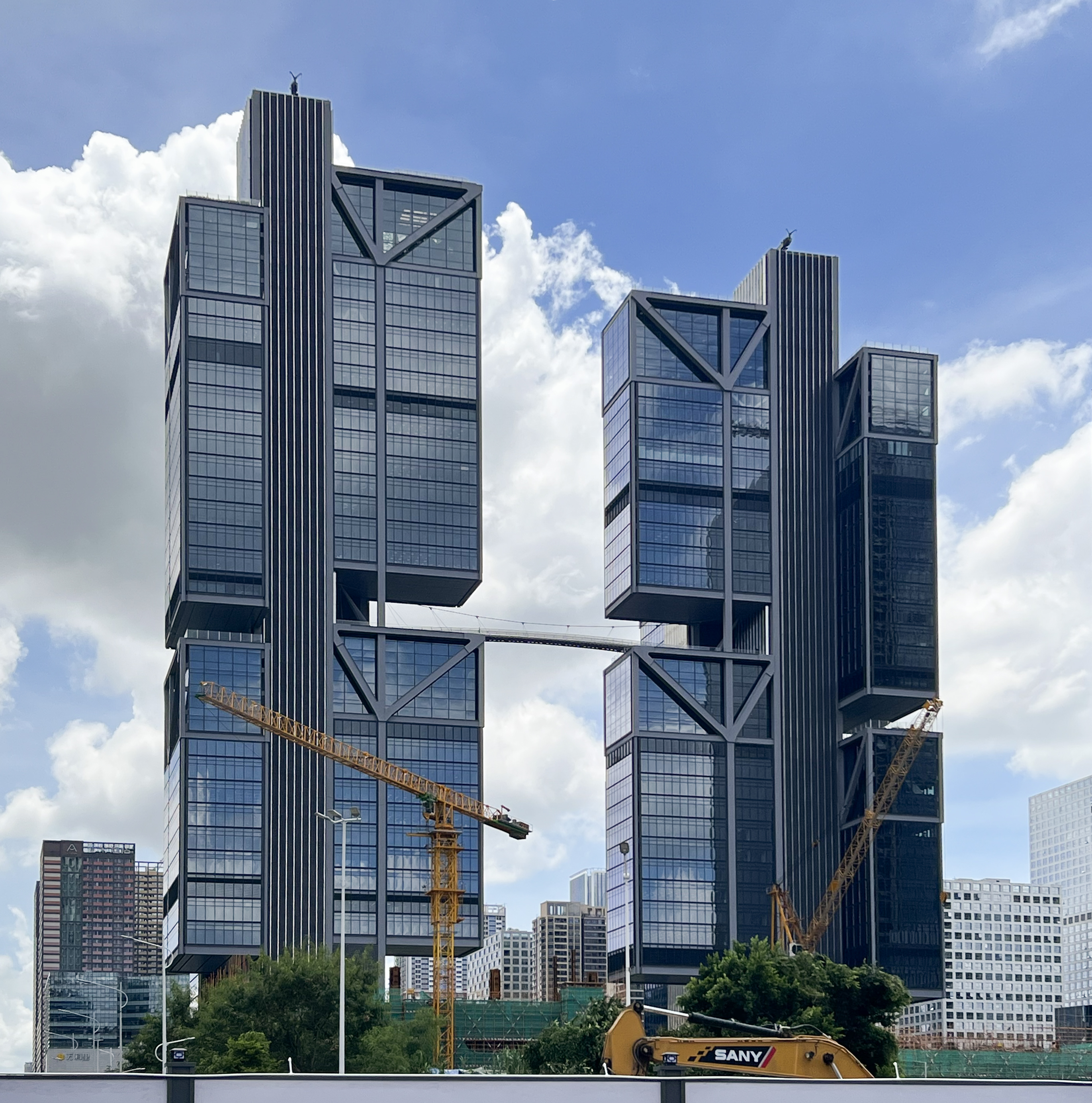
- DJI Sky City in 2023
- Interactive map of the DJI Sky City area

General information
- Status: Completed
- Location: Liuxiandong, Xili Subdistrict, Nanshan, Shenzhen, Guangdong, China
- Coordinates: 22.580354°N 113.937989°E
- Groundbreaking: 2017
- Completed: December 2022
- Owner: DJI

Design and construction
- Architect: Norman Foster
- Architecture firm: Foster + Partners
- Developer: China State Construction Engineering Corporation
- Structural engineer: Arup

DJI Sky City (Chinese: 大疆天空之城) is a two-tower office complex in Nanshan, Shenzhen, Guangdong, China. It is owned by DJI and serves as its global corporate headquarters.

The office complex was designed by English architect Norman Foster of Foster and Partners and constructed by China State Construction Engineering Corporation. The project broke ground in 2017 and completed in December 2022.

The complex consists of two tower buildings, each with a central core with large volumes cantilevered. Multiple protruding glass blocks are suspended asymmetrically on the side. The complex is expected to host 8,000 employees with office space, research and development, testing, and public facilities. The two skyscrapers are around 200 meters tall (213m and 195m respectively), with an open-air suspension bridge connecting them at 100 meters above the ground.
