= Airlift Technologies =

Pakistani company

- Industry: Transportation Grocery Delivery
- Founded: March 2019
- Founders: Usman Gul; Ahmed Ayub; Meher Farrukh
- Defunct: 13th July 2022
- Fate: Insolvency
- Headquarters: Lahore Karachi, Lahore, Pakistan
- Area served: South Africa (Johannesburg, Pretoria, Cape Town) and Pakistan (Karachi, Lahore, Islamabad, Peshawar, Faisalabad, Gujranwala, Sialkot)
- Key people: Usman Gul; Ahmed Ayub; Meher Farrukh
- Products: Airlift Express (Airlift Grocer) and Airlift Transit
- Website: airlifttech.com

Airlift Technologies was a Pakistani company that initially started its operations in Pakistan as a mass transit, ride-hailing service. Amidst COVID 19 and a total lockdown in Pakistan, the company was unable to continue its operations and quickly pivoted into instant delivery service. It was founded in March 2019. It closed all operations on 13 July 2022. Customers of the company used a mobile application or website to order groceries and essentials online, and airlift and secure the items from their warehouse, delivering the items to the consumer within 30 minutes.

== History ==
The idea of Airlift was conceived by the founding Chief Executive Usman Gul after he experienced the congestion during his visit to Lahore for vacations which was caused by the inefficiency of local transportation.

In March 2019, Gul along with a small team founded Airlift and launched its operations with a pilot project in Lahore. Gul initially self-funded the startup using US$50,000. With COVID 19 spreading in Pakistan, the company was forced to halt operations for an indefinite period in order to contain the spread. Gul realized a potential opportunity and quickly pivoted into Q-Commerce Grocery Delivery Business model raising a funding of $12 million in the Series A financing round.

As of July 2019, the company was operating in two Pakistani cities, Karachi and Lahore. In August 2019, Airlift raised $2.2 million in seed funding from local and international institutions.

According to a report, Airlift acquired 50,000 riders in Lahore in less than five months of its operations. In November 2019, the company raised Series A funding of $12 million which included participation from American venture capital firm First Round Capital.

The downturn of economic conditions in 2022 and depleted venture capital funding resulted in the company's suspension of business operations.

== Funding ==
Airlift introduced an online grocery service in Pakistan with the name of "Airlift Express" bringing $10 Million foreign investment. Later in 2021, Airlift secured 85 million USD funding in Series B financing which was the largest raised by a startup in Pakistan, Middle East, and North Africa. The round was co-led by Buckley Ventures and 20 VC Explorer.

The total funding raised by Airlift amounted 110 million USD, taking the startup valuation at 275 million USD.

== See also ==
- Ridesharing company
