= DJI Matrice =

Chinese industrial drone

Matrice 经纬
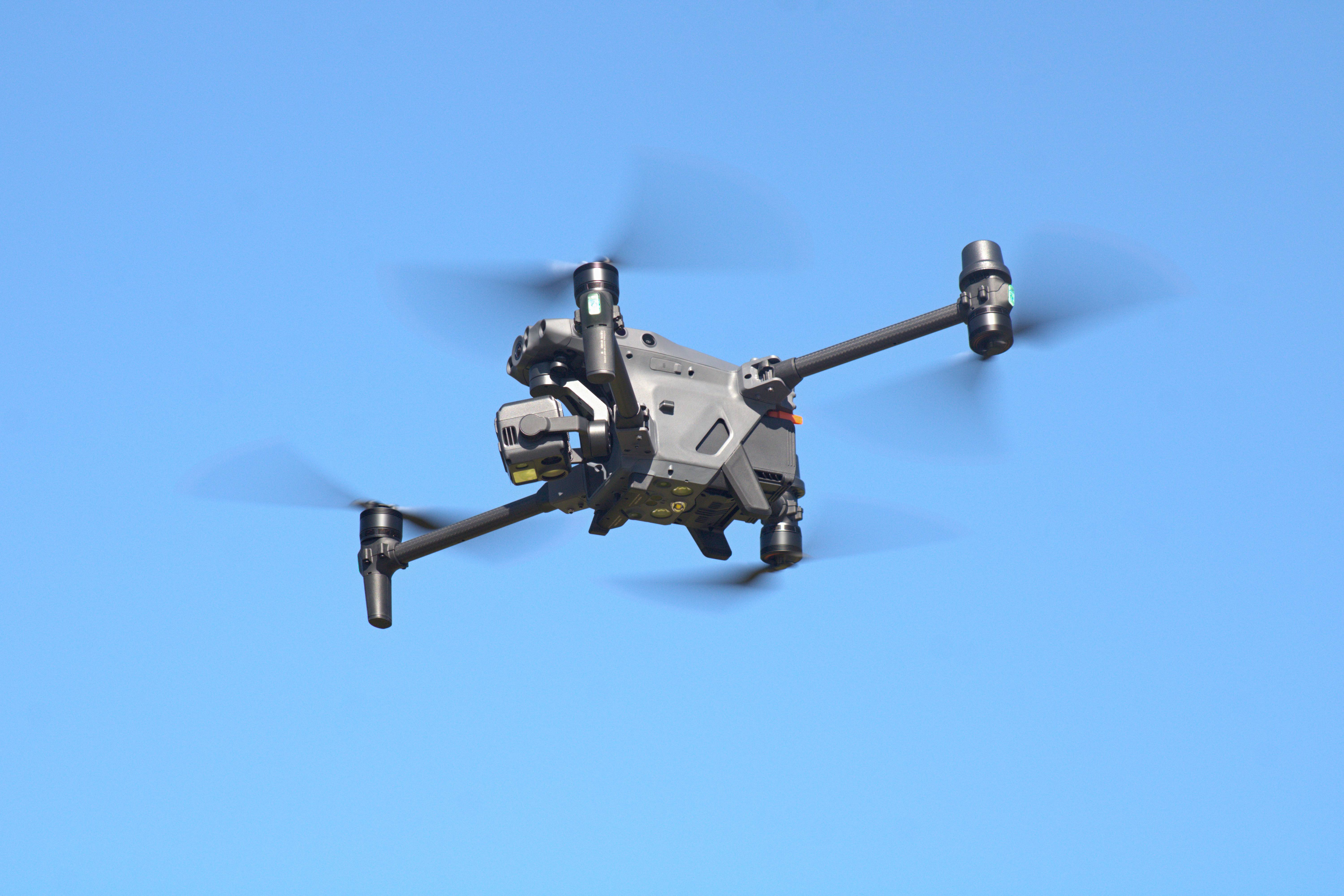
- Matrice 30T in flight

General information
- Type: Industrial drone
- National origin: China
- Manufacturer: DJI
- Status: In production

History
- Manufactured: 2015–present
- Introduction date: June 2015

The DJI Matrice (Chinese: 经纬; pinyin: Jīngwěi) is a series of multirotor industrial drones released by the Chinese technology company DJI.

== Design and development ==
DJI announced the Matrice 100 in June 2015. The Matrice 100 or M100 was intended for developers of drone software and hardware solutions and is capable of flying for 20 minutes on a single battery with a 1 kg (2.2 lb) payload, though this can be increased to 40 minutes with two 5700 mAh TB48D batteries without payload. The drone features a quadcopter layout with landing legs at the tips of its four arms. Like the DJI Phantom, the Matrice 100 uses a Lightbridge video transmission system. The drone was designed to be compatible with the Zenmuse X3 camera/gimbal of the DJI Inspire 1, though any camera with an analog video output or HDMI port can also be used. The Matrice 100 is also compatible with the DJI Guidance collision avoidance system, which was released alongside the drone.

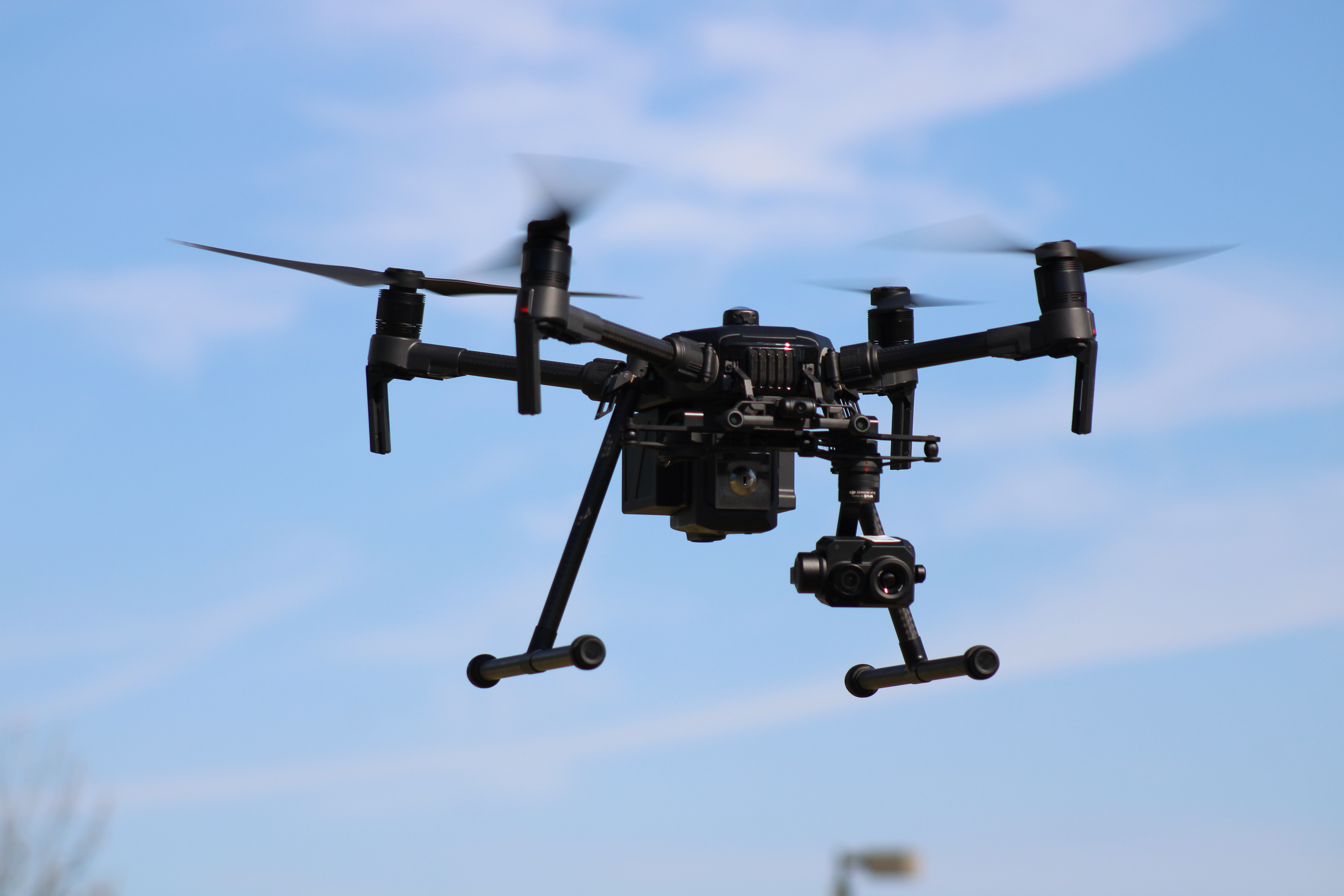
Matrice 210 with a Zenmuse XT2 thermal imaging camera on its lower left gimbal mount. The lower right and upper mounts are empty.

In February 2017, DJI introduced several redesigned versions of the Matrice as the Matrice 200 series. The series originally consisted of three variants; the Matrice 200 with a single downward-facing gimbal mount, the Matrice 210 with two downward and one upward-facing gimbal mount, and Matrice 210 RTK with a DJI D-RTK real-time kinematic (RTK) positioning module. The M200 series has an IP43 protection rating, allowing the drones to fly in rain, and features a built-in first-person view (FPV) camera and a suite of 20 sensors including an ADS-B receiver and redundant inertial measurement units (IMU). The drones are compatible with several DJI camera gimbal models, including the Zenmuse X4S, X5S, and Z30 visual spectrum cameras as well as the Zenmuse XT and XT2 thermal imaging cameras. Power is provided by a pair of 7660 mAh TB55 batteries, which are automatically heated to allow the drone to fly in freezing temperatures, giving the drone a total flight time of 38 minutes without a payload. The M200 V2 series was released in February 2019 with multiple upgrades including an AES-256 encrypted OcuSync 2.0 video transmission system, anti-collision lights for night operations, improved performance with multiple payloads, and support for the Zenmuse X7 gimbal.

The Matrice 300 RTK was released in July 2020 alongside the compatible Zenmuse H20 "hybrid" multi-sensor camera gimbal. The drone features a folding design with an IP45 protection rating, downward-facing motors, a built-in 6-direction collision avoidance system, an OcuSync Enterprise transmission system, and a D-RTK module. Power is provided by a 5935 mAh battery, giving it a flight time of 45 minutes with a 700 g (1.5 lb) payload. The similar Matrice 350 RTK was released in May 2023 with multiple improvements, including an O3 Enterprise transmission system, enhanced FPV camera, IP55 protection system, and a TB65 battery giving it a flight time of 55 minutes.

In June 2025, DJI released the successor to the Matrice 350 RTK as the Matrice 400. Improvements over its predecessor include a built-in lidar/radar-based obstacle avoidance system, an O4 Enterprise transmission system, the ability to mount up to seven payloads simultaneously with a total payload weight of 6 kg (13 lb). Power is provided by a 20254 mAh TB100 battery, giving the drone a flight time of 59 minutes with a single Zenmuse H30T camera gimbal or 31 minutes with a maximum payload.

=== Matrice 600 series ===
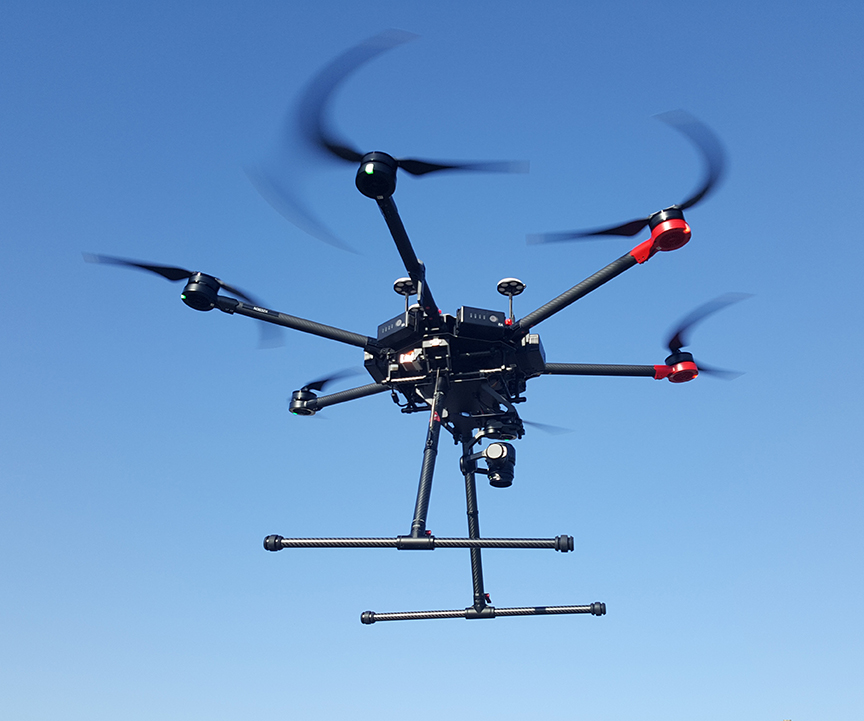
Matrice 600 Pro with landing gear extended and carrying a Zenmuse camera gimbal.

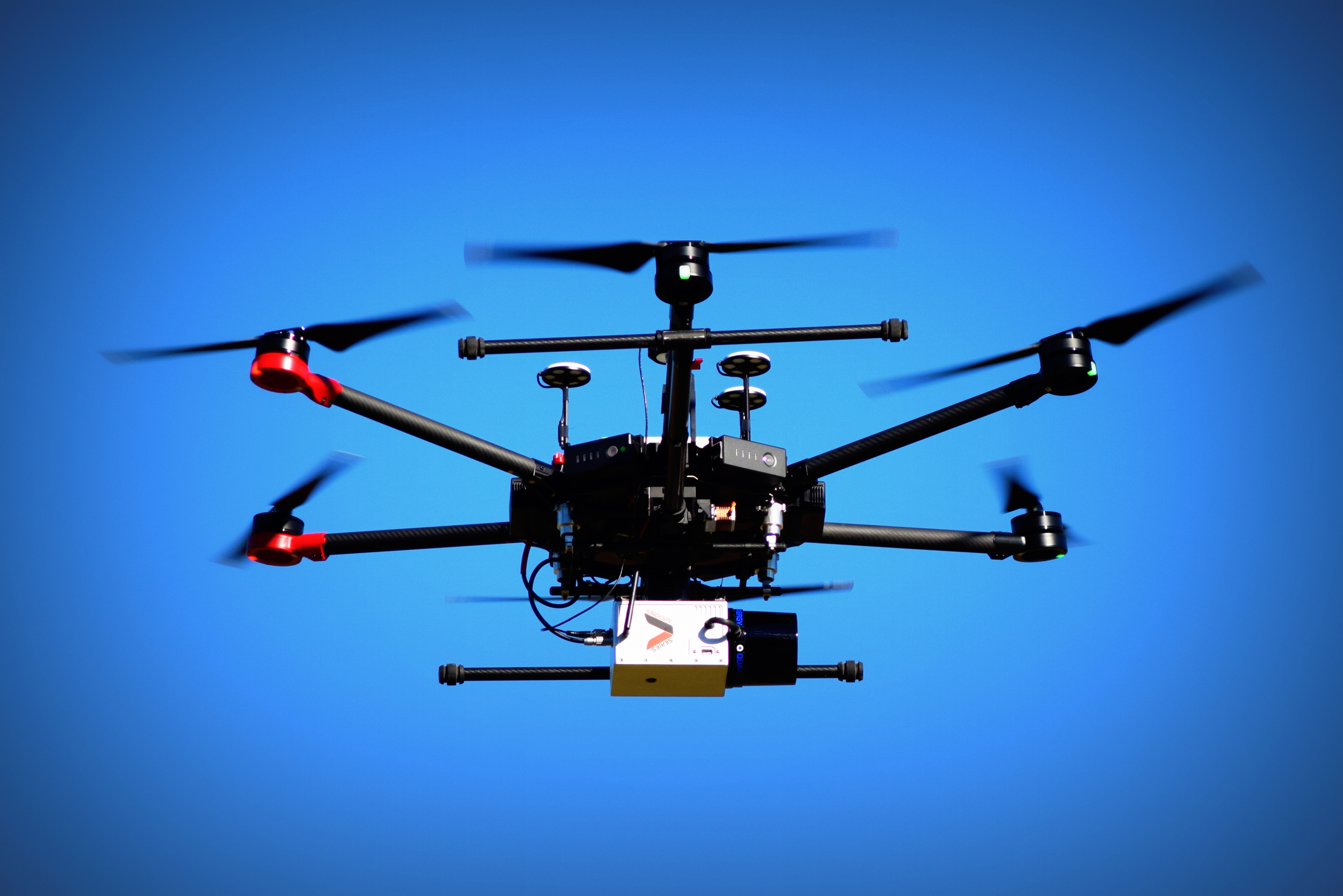
Matrice 600 Pro with landing gear retracted and carrying a SNoopy 120 lidar system.

The Matrice 600 was released in April 2016 as a successor to the DJI Spreading Wings series. The drone is largely unrelated to the Matrice 100; being a hexacopter rather than a quadcopter and featuring retractable landing gear. At the time of release, Matrice 600 was compatible with all Zenmuse X-series cameras as well as the Ronin MX gimbal, capable of mounting the Red Epic and among other camera models. The drone features an A3 flight controller and a Lightbridge 2 transmission system. An optional A3 Pro flight controller was available, providing the drone with three GNSS units and three IMUs, and could be paired with an optional RTK module for further improved positioning. Power was provided by a total of six 4500 mAh TB47S or 5700 mAh TB48S batteries; the latter giving the drone a flight time of 40 minutes with no payload or 18 minutes with a 5.5 kg (12 lb) payload.

The improved Matrice 600 Pro was released in November 2016. Compared to its predecessor, the M600 Pro features an A3 Pro flight controller as standard equipment, a Lightbridge 2 HD transmission system, and pre-installed arms and antennas for ease of setup. Like its predecessor, power was provided by a total of six TB47S or TB48S batteries; the latter giving the drone a flight time of 35 minutes with a Zenmuse XT gimbal. The Matrice 600 Pro's battery management system is designed land the drone safely if one of its six batteries fails.

=== Matrice 30 series ===
In March 2022, DJI unveiled the Matrice 30 and Matrice 30T alongside the Dock ground station. Unlike previous Matrice models, the Matrice 30 series has folding arms similar to the smaller DJI Mavic, allowing it to be carried in a backpack. The drone also features an IP55 protection rating and a built-in Zenmuse H20N camera gimbal, with the Matrice 30T's gimbal including a thermal camera while the Matrice 30 lacks such a camera. The drone is compatible with either standard Model 1671 propellers or Model 1676 high-altitude propellers; the latter being included in some countries and regions as standard equipment. Power is provided by two 5880 mAh TB30 batteries, giving the drone a maximum flight time of 41 minutes when fitted with Model 1671 propellers. When paired with the DJI Dock, a Matrice 30 series drone can operate fully autonomously and can charge its battery at the ground station. Two additional variants, the Matrice 30 EU and Matrice 30T EU, were released for the European market with EASA C2 certification.

=== Matrice 3/4 series ===
The Matrice 3D and Matrice 3TD were released alongside the Dock 2 ground station in March 2024. When photos of the Matrice 3D were leaked in October 2023, the drone was noted to be similar to the Mavic 3, but larger and without folding arms. The Matrice 3D/3TD is smaller than the Matrice 30 series and has raised arms, allowing it to fit in the smaller Dock 2. The Matrice 3D features a gimbal with a 12-megapixel 1/2" CMOS telephoto camera and a 20MP 4/3" CMOS wide-angle camera with a mechanical shutter. The Matrice 3TD swaps the 4/3" CMOS wide-angle camera for a 48MP 1/1.32" CMOS unit, making room for an infrared thermal camera mounted beside it. Both drones have an IP54 protection rating and feature a built-in RTK module. Power is provided by a 7811 mAh battery, giving the drone a flight time of 50 minutes.

In January 2025, DJI released the Matrice 4 series as the successor to the Mavic 3 Enterprise series. The body of the Matrice 4 series is similar to that of the Mavic 3, albeit with an RTK module on top. The Matrice 4 series originally consisted of two models; the Matrce 4E and Matrice 4T, differing primarily in the cameras equipped. The Matrice 4E has three cameras; a 20MP 4/3" CMOS wide-angle camera, a 48MP 1/1.5-inch CMOS telephoto camera, and a 48MP 1/1.3" CMOS medium telephoto camera. The Matrice 4T retains the telephoto and medium telephoto cameras, but replaces the wide-angle camera with a smaller 48MP 1/1.3" CMOS unit, making room for a 1280×1024 pixel thermal camera. Both drones have integrated artificial intelligence and can be fitted with the optional AL1 spotlight and AS1 speaker attachments for crowd control or search and rescue operations.

Two additional drones were added to the Matrice 4 series in February 2025 to complement the Dock 3 vehicle-based ground station. The Matrice 4D and Matrice 4TD share the same cameras as the Matrice 4E and Matrice 4T, respectively, and have longer, fixed armed similar to the Matrice 3 series. The drones also feature anti-ice low-noise propellers and an IP55 protection rating. Power is provided by a 6768 mAh battery, giving the drone a flight time of 54 minutes.

== Variants ==
Matrice 100
Company designation Model M100. Original model with quadcopter configuration, Lightbridge video transmission system, DJI 3510 motors, DJI 1345s propellers, and powered by one or two standard 4500 mAh TB47D or optional 5700 mAh TB48D batteries; the latter giving it a maximum hover time of 40 minutes without a payload. Compatible with the Zenmuse X3 gimbal and Guidance collision avoidance system. Announced in June 2015. Production ceased in January 2019.

Matrice 200
Company designation Model M200. Redesigned model with an IP43 protection rating, a single downward-facing gimbal mount, a built-in FPV camera, a suite of 20 sensors including an ADS-B receiver and redundant IMUs, DJI 3515 motors, DJI 1760S propellers, and powered by two standard 4280 mAh TB50 or optional 7660 mAh TB55 batteries; the latter giving it a maximum hover time of 38 minutes without a payload. Compatible with the Zenmuse X4S, X5S, XT, XT2, and Z30 gimbals. Introduced in February 2017 alongside the Matrice 210 and Matrice 210 RTK. Production ceased in January 2019.
Matrice 200 V2
Company designation Model M200 V2. Improved Matrice 200 with an AES-256 encrypted OcuSync 2.0 transmission system, anti-collision lights, improved performance, support for the Zenmuse X7 gimbal, and TB55 batteries as standard. Introduced in February 2019 alongside the Matrice 210 V2 and Matrice 210 RTK V2. Production ceased in March 2021.
Matrice 210
Company designation Model M210. As Matrice 200 but with a second downward-facing gimbal mount and an upward-facing gimbal mount. Introduced in February 2017 alongside the Matrice 200 and Matrice 210 RTK. Production ceased in January 2019.
Matrice 210 V2
Company designation Model M210 V2. As Matrice 210 but with M200 V2 upgrades and a reduced flight time of 34 minutes without a payload. Introduced in February 2019 alongside the Matrice 200 V2 and Matrice 210 RTK V2. Production ceased in March 2021.
Matrice 210 RTK
Company designation Model M210RTK.As Matrice 210 but with a built-in D-RTK module and a flight time of 32 minutes with two TB55 batteries and no payload. Introduced in February 2017 alongside the Matrice 200 and Matrice 210. Production ceased in January 2019.
Matrice 210 RTK V2
Company designation Model M210 RTK V2. As Matrice 210 RTK but with M200 V2 upgrades and an increased flight time of 32 minutes without a payload. Introduced in February 2019 alongside the Matrice 200 V2 and Matrice 210 V2. Production ceased in March 2021.

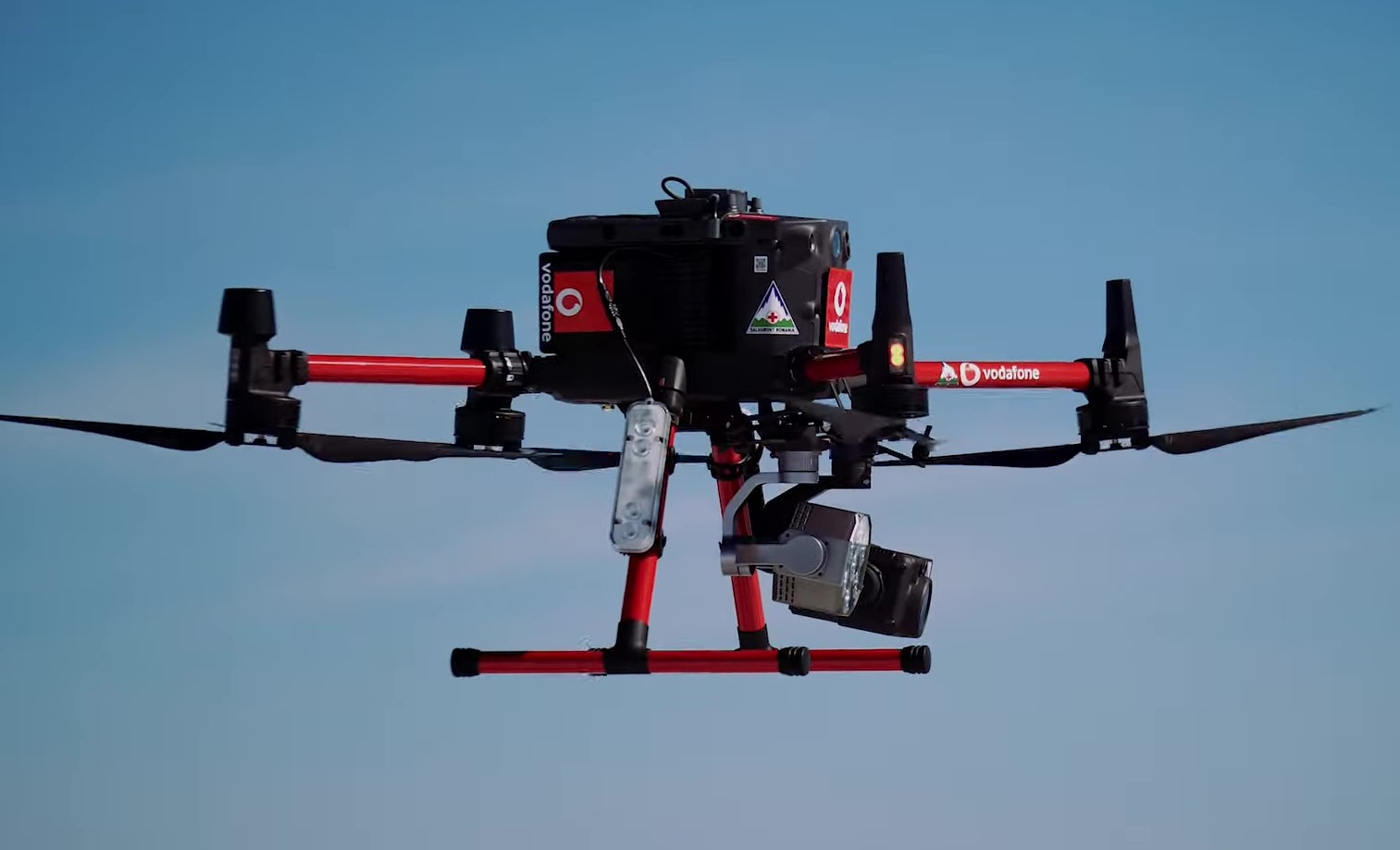
Vodafone Matrice 300 RTK

Matrice 300 RTK
Company designation Model M300. Improved model with a folding design, an IP45 protection rating, downward-facing motors, a 6-direction collision avoidance system, an OcuSync Enterprise transmission system, a D-RTK module, downward-facing DJI 6009 motors, DJI 2110 propellers, and a single 5935 mAh battery giving it a flight time of 45 minutes with a 700 g (1.5 lb) payload. Compatible with the Zenmuse H20, H20N, H20T, L1, P1, XT S, XT2, and Z30 gimbals as well as DJI 2195 high-altitude propellers. Released in July 2020.

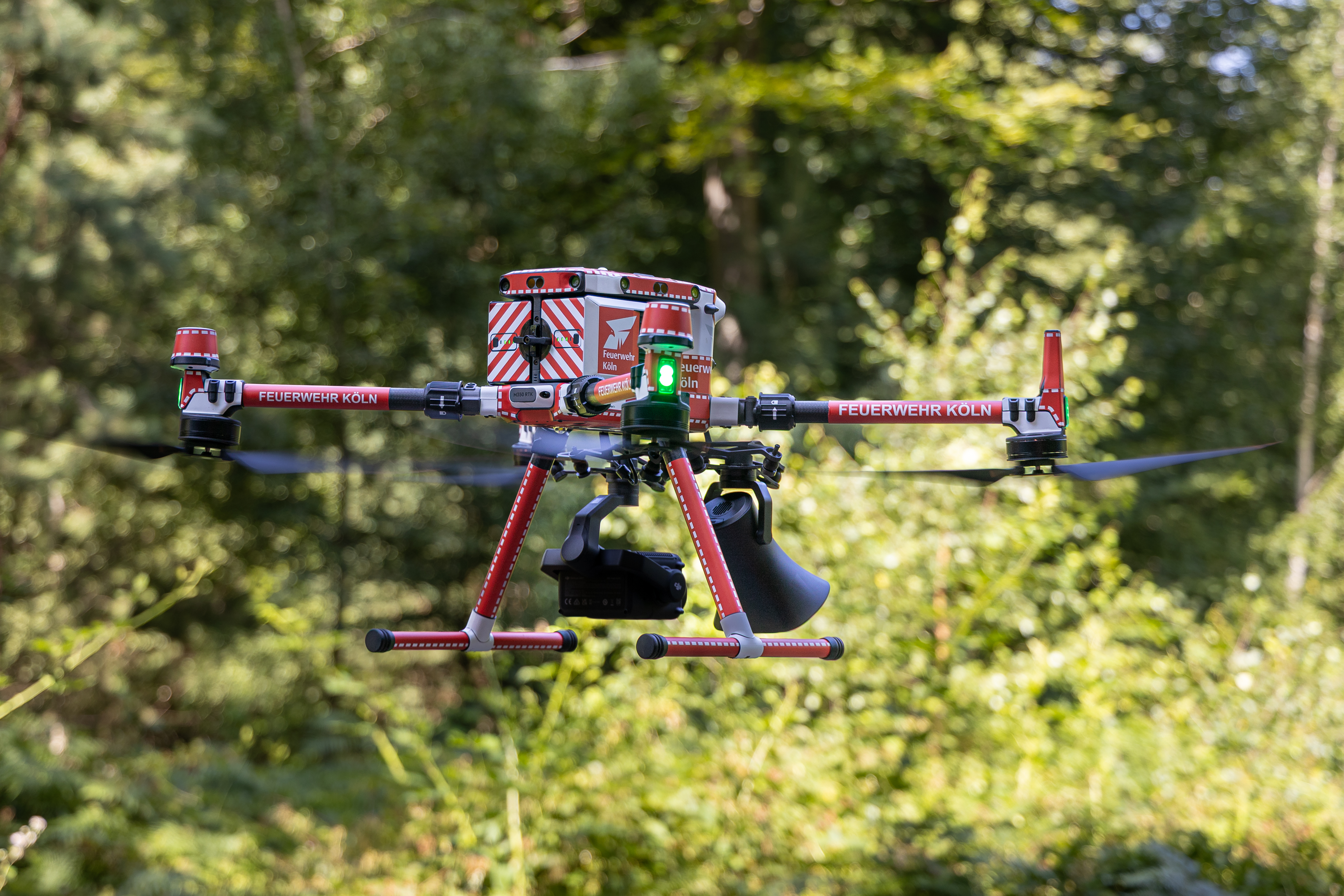
Cologne Fire Department Matrice 350 RTK

Matrice 350 RTK
Company designation Model M350 RTK. Improved Matrice 300 RTK with an O3 Enterprise transmission system, enhanced FPV camera, IP55 protection system, DJI 2110 propellers, and a 5880 mAh TB65 battery giving it a flight time of 55 minutes with no payload. Compatible with the Zenmuse H20, H20N, H20T, L1, and P1 gimbals as well as DJI 2112 high-altitude propellers. Released in May 2023.

Matrice 400
Improved model with a lidar/radar-based obstacle avoidance system, an O4 Enterprise transmission system, mounts for up to seven payloads, DJI 2510F propellers, and powered by a 20254 mAh TB100 battery giving it a flight time of 59 minutes with a single Zenmuse H30T gimbal. Compatible with Zenmuse H30, H30T, L2, P1, S1, and V1 gimbals. Released in June 2025.
Matrice 400A
Company designation Model M400A. Variant revealed in a product label submitted to the Federal Communications Commission in March 2025. According to the label, the Matrice 400A will be powered by a 20254 mAh, 977Wh battery.

=== Matrice 600 series ===
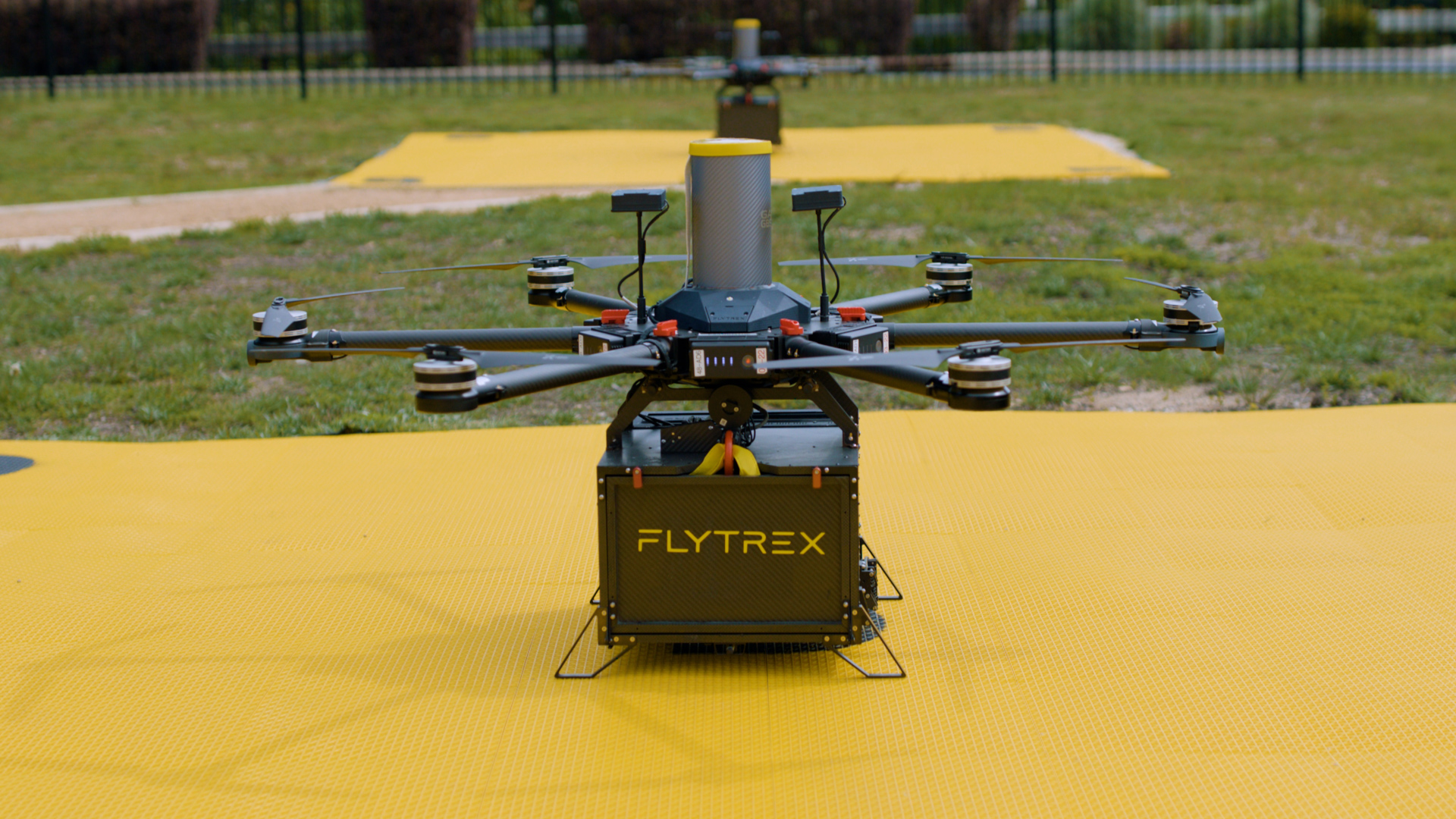
Flytrex FTX-M600P, a delivery drone based on the Matrice 600

Matrice 600
Company designation Model M600. Hexacopter successor to the DJI Spreading Wings with retractable landing gear, an A3 flight controller, a Lightbridge 2 transmission system, DJI 6010 motors, DJI 2170 propellers, and powered by six 4500 mAh TB47S or 5700 mAh TB48S batteries; the latter giving it a flight time of 40 minutes with no payload. Compatible with Zenmuse X3, X5, XT, Z15 series, and Ronin MX gimbals as well as the A3 Pro flight controller. Released in April 2016. Production ceased in December 2016.
Matrice 600 Pro
Improved Matrice 600 with an A3 Pro flight controller, a Lightbridge 2 HD transmission system, pre-installed arms and antennas, and a battery management system to handle battery failures. Released in November 2016. Production ceased in May 2021.
FTX-M600P
Delivery drone created from a Matrice 600 airframe by Flytrex.

=== Matrice 30 series ===
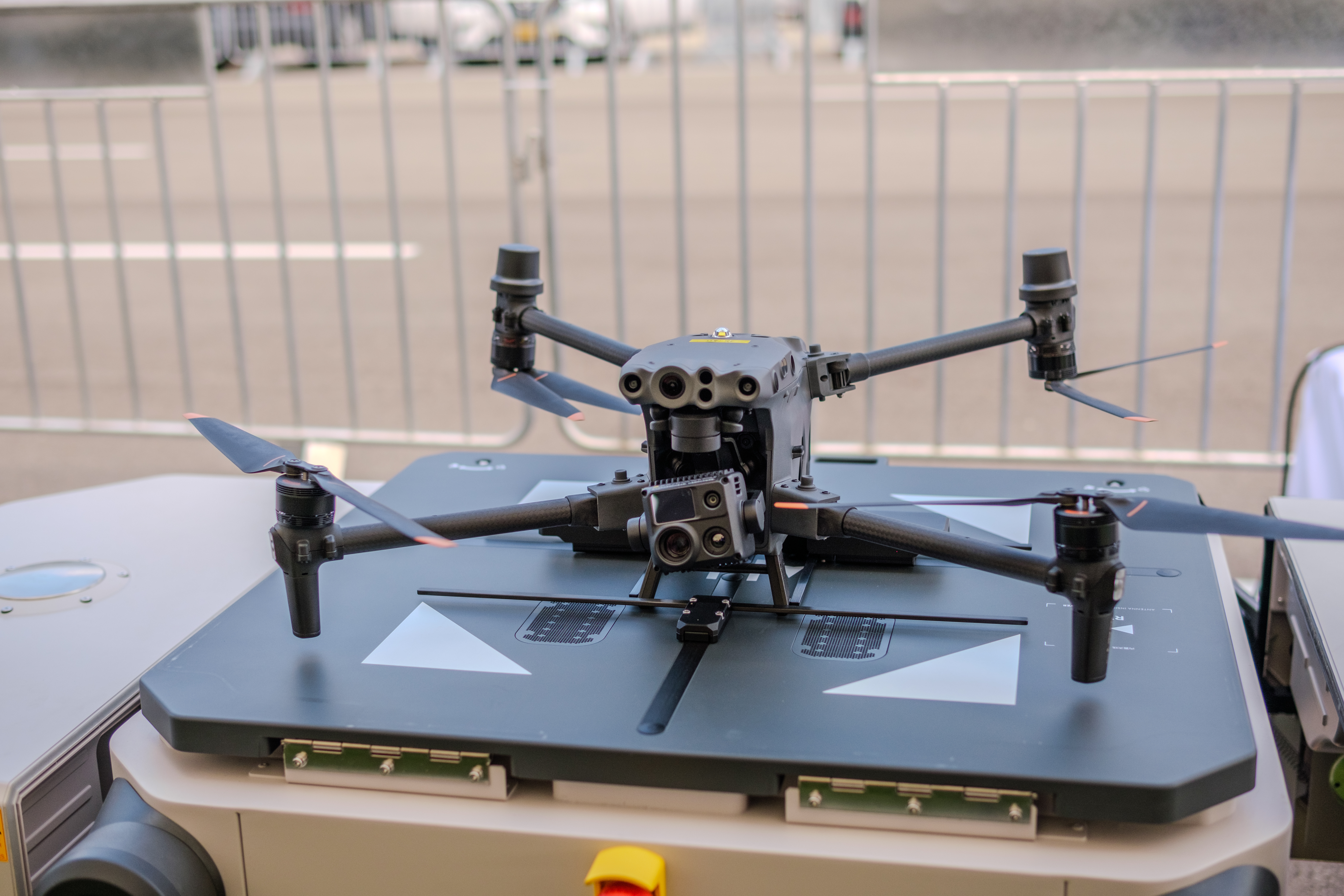
Matrice 30T on a DJI Dock

Matrice 30
Company designation Model M30 RTK. Compact model with folding arms, an IP55 protection rating, a built-in Zenmuse H20N camera gimbal without a thermal camera, DJI 3511 motors, DJI 1671 propellers, and powered by two 5880 mAh TB30 batteries giving it a flight time of 41 minutes. Intended for use with the DJI Dock ground station and compatible with DJI 1676 high-altitude propellers. Released in March 2022 alongside the Matrice 30T.
Matrice 30 EU
EASA C2 certified version of the Matrice 30.
Matrice 30T
Company designation Model M30T RTK. As Matrice 30 but with a thermal camera. Released in March 2022 alongside the Matrice 30.
Matrice 30T EU
EASA C2 certified version of the Matrice 30T.

=== Matrice 3/4 series ===
Matrice 3D
Company designation Model M3D. Compact model with non-folding raised arms, an IP54 protection rating, a built-in RTK module, a 12MP 1/2" CMOS telephoto camera, a 20MP 4/3" CMOS wide-angle camera, DJI 2607 motors, DJI 1149 propellers, and powered by a 7811 mAh battery giving it a flight time of 50 minutes. Intended for use with the DJI Dock 2 ground station, but also compatible with the later Dock 3. Released in March 2024 alongside the Matrice 3TD.

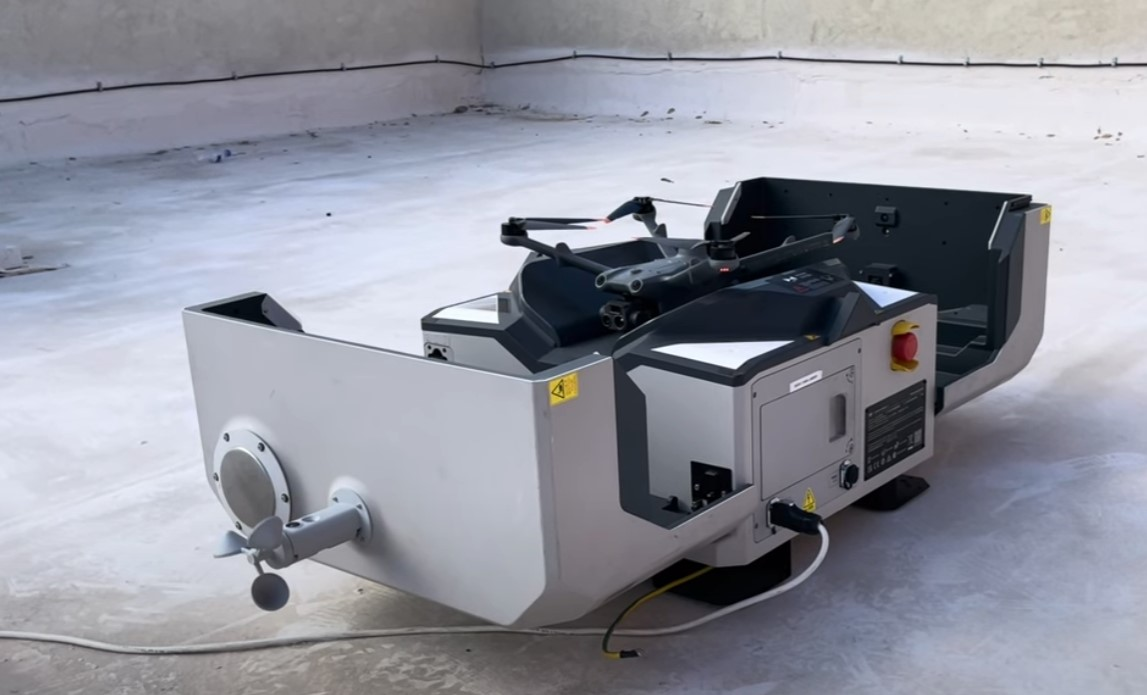
Matrice 3TD in a Dock 2

Matrice 3TD
Company designation Model M3TD. As Matrice 3D but with the 20MP wide-angle camera replaced by a 48MP 1/1.32" CMOS unit and a thermal camera. Released in March 2024 alongside the Matrice 3D.

Matrice 4E
Company designation Model M4E. Compact model to replace the Mavic 3 Enterprise. Has a body similar to the Mavic 3 with folding arms, an RTK module, integrated artificial intelligence, a camera suite consisting of 20MP 4/3" CMOS wide-angle, a 48MP 1/1.5-inch CMOS telephoto, and a 48MP 1/1.3" CMOS medium telephoto cameras, DJI 1157F propellers, and powered by a 6741 mAh battery giving it a flight time of 49 minutes. Compatible with DJI 1154F low-noise propellers as well as the AL1 spotlight and AS1 speaker attachments. Released in January 2025 alongside the Matrice 4T.
Matrice 4T
Company designation Model M4T. As Matrice 4E but with the 20MP wide-angle camera replaced by a 48MP 1/1.3" CMOS unit and a 1280×1024 pixel thermal camera. Released in January 2025 alongside the Matrice 4E.
Matrice 4D
Company designation Model M4D. Compact model with non-folding raised arms, an IP55 protection rating, the Matrice 4E camera suite, DJI 2611 motors, DJI 1364F anti-ice low-noise propellers, and powered by a 6768 mAh battery giving it a flight time of 54 minutes. Intended for use with the DJI Dock 3 ground station. Released in February 2025 alongside the Matrice 4TD.
Matrice 4TD
Company designation Model M4TD. As Matrice 4D but with the camera suite of the Matrice 4T. Released in February 2025 alongside the Matrice 4D.

== Operators ==
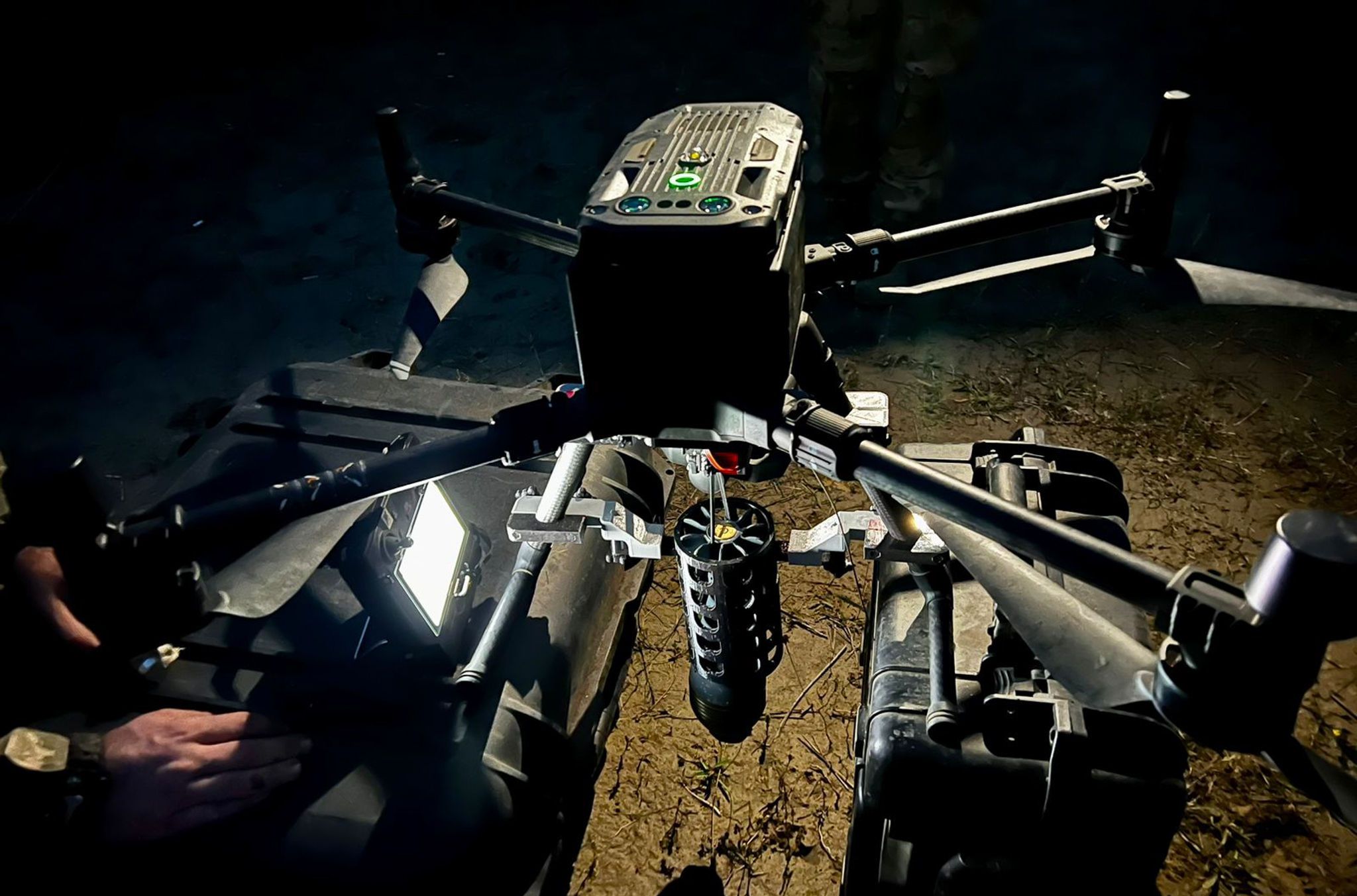
Matrice 300 RTK of the Ukrainian 72nd Mechanized Brigade modified as a "bomber" carrying a single mortar.

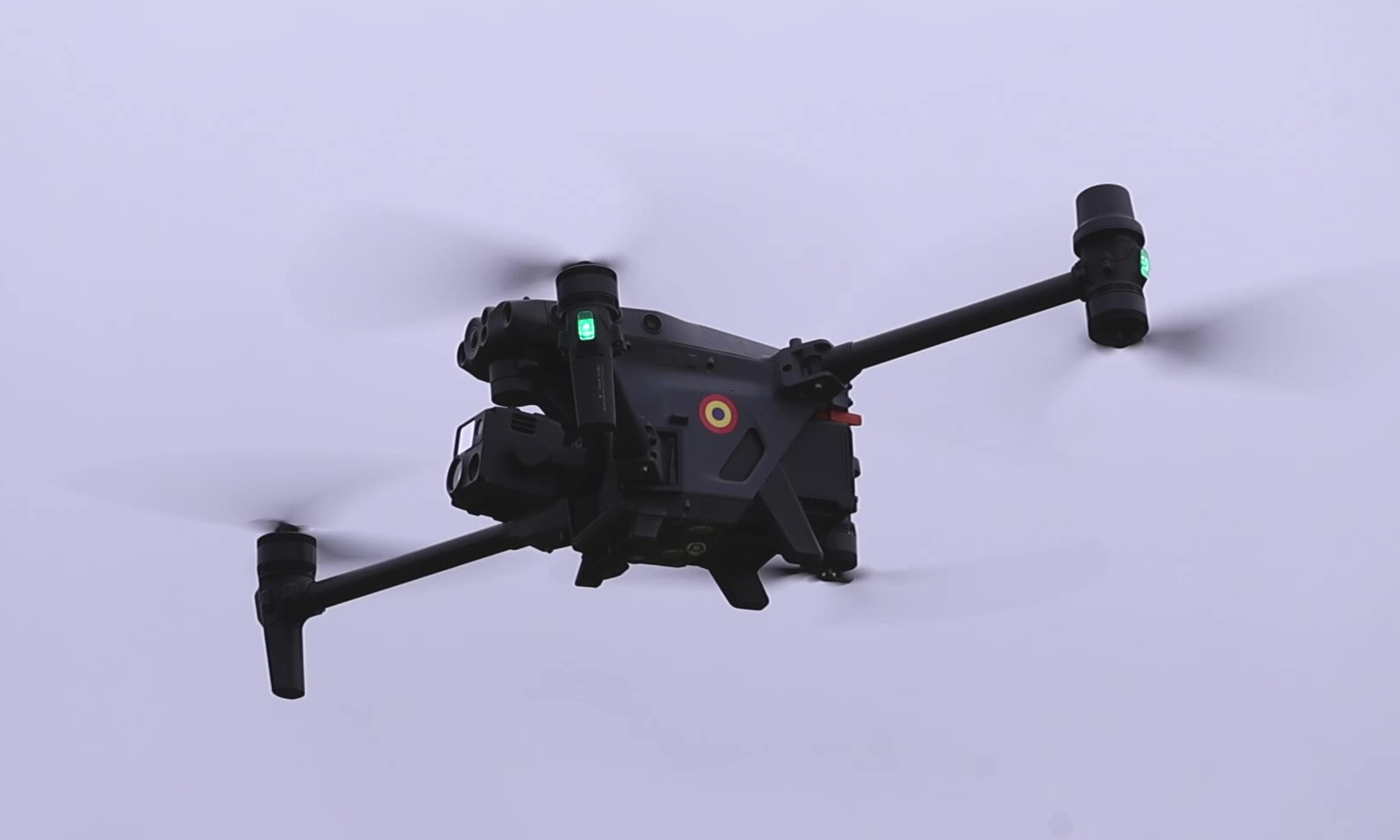
Matrice 30T in Romanian service

Argentina

- Argentine Army introduced the Matrice 210 in 2019.

Brazil

- Brazilian Army Aviation had four Matrice 300 RTK drones in service as of December 2023, all equipped with the Zenmuse H20T camera.

Dominican Republic

- Dominican Armed Forces introduced the Matrice 210 in 2018.

Greece

- Hellenic Army used the Matrice 300 RTK as of 2021.

Israel

- Israeli Ground Forces introduced the Matrice in 2017. In 2018, the IDF used Matrice 600 drones to drop tear gas on protestors in Gaza. As of February 2021, Israel was also using the Matrice 100; one of which came down over Lebanon. Hezbollah claimed responsibility for the downing, though the IDF denied this and claimed that it had simply fallen from the sky near the Blue Line.

Moldova

- Moldovan Ground Forces had at least 18 Matrice 300 RTK drones in service as of August 2023.

Portugal

- Madeira Operational Command used the Matrice 300 RTK as of December 2020.

Romania

- Romanian Armed Forces used Matrice 300 RTK and Matrice 30 drones since at least 2023.
- Salvamont used various Matrice series drones for mountain rescue activities as of 2025.

Ukraine

- State Border Guard Service of Ukraine bought 60 Matrice 300 drones in 2021. Ukraine acquired a further 78 Matrice 300s in 2022 using funds raised on the United24 platform.

== Accidents and incidents ==
4 August 2018
Two Matrice 600 drones detonated explosives near Avenida Bolívar, Caracas, where Nicolás Maduro, the President of Venezuela, was addressing the Bolivarian National Guard in front of the Centro Simón Bolívar Towers and Palacio de Justicia de Caracas. The Venezuelan government claims the event was a targeted attempt to assassinate Maduro, though the cause and intention of the explosions is debated. Others have suggested the incident was a false flag operation designed by the government to justify repression of opposition in Venezuela.
October 2018
The West Midlands Police grounded its Matrice 200 fleet after one of its drones fell from the sky due to a power failure. After several such incidents were reported, DJI issued a statement urging caution when flying drones powered by the TB50 and TB55 batteries, including the Matrice 200 series and Inspire 2, while stating that they were working on a firmware update to fix the issue. The Civil Aviation Authority also issued restrictions on flights with these batteries. PetaPixel compared the issue to a similar string of incidents involving the GoPro Karma shortly after its launch in 2016.
6 May 2021
A Matrice 300 RTK, registered FA3HW43WTF, was involved in an accident while performing a flight demonstration next to a prison in Young Harris, Georgia. The drone, which was carrying a Zenmuse H20T camera and Wingsland Z15 spotlight payload, took off near the prison's "Restricted Zone" geofence. Seven minutes into the flight the pilot initiated the "return-to-home" (RTH) function, but the close proximity of the geofence prevented the drone from completing the command, instead causing it to hover at the zone border over a parked vehicle despite the pilot's attempts to cancel the RTH command. The pilot grabbed the drone by the landing gear and attempted to pull the drone away from the vehicle, but drone's positioning system resisted. The pilot then handed the controller to a demonstration attendee and attempted to remove the drone's battery, but one of the propellers struck his right hand resulting in a serious injury. The pilot held onto the drone for several more minutes until the batteries were depleted. The National Transportation Safety Board conducted an investigation into the accident. In its final report, the NTSB determined the probable cause of the accident to be "inadequate preflight planning and lack of airspace awareness", as well as the pilot's decision to hold onto the drone mid-flight.
10 August 2021
A Cessna 172 collided with a Matrice 210 operated by the York Regional Police while on approach to Buttonville Municipal Airport. The Cessna landed without incident and suffered major damage, including a bent airbox, a damaged engine cowling, and a propeller strike.

== Specifications (Matrice 300 RTK with standard propellers) ==
Data from Matrice 300 RTK user manual

General characteristics

- Capacity: 2,700 g (6.0 lb) payload
- Length: 0.810 m (2 ft 8 in) (0.430 m (1 ft 4.9 in) folded)
- Width: 0.670 m (2 ft 2 in) (0.420 m (1 ft 4.5 in) folded)
- Height: 0.430 m (1 ft 5 in)
- Empty weight: 3.600 kg (8 lb) excluding battery
- Max takeoff weight: 9.000 kg (20 lb)
- Battery capacity: 52.8V 5935 mAh (274 Wh)
- Powerplant: 4 × DJI 6009 brushless DC electric motor
- Propellers: 2-bladed DJI 2110, 0.53 m (1 ft 9 in) diameter

Performance

- Maximum speed: 82.8 km/h (51.4 mph, 44.7 kn)
- Endurance: 45 minutes with 700 g (1.5 lb)
- Service ceiling: 5,000 m (16,000 ft)
- Rate of climb: 6 m/s (1,200 ft/min)

Avionics

- Camera: 960p FPV camera
- Gimbal compatibility: Zenmuse H20, H20N, H20T, L1, P1, XT S, XT2, Z30
- GNSS compatibility: GPS, GLONASS, BeiDou, Galileo
- Transmission system: OcuSync Enterprise

== See also ==
- History of unmanned aerial vehicles

Aircraft of comparable role, configuration, and era

- Autel Evo
- Intel Falcon 8
- Skydio X2
- Skydio X10
- Yuneec International Typhoon H

Related lists

- List of unmanned aerial vehicles
