= Skydio X10 =

American camera drone

X10
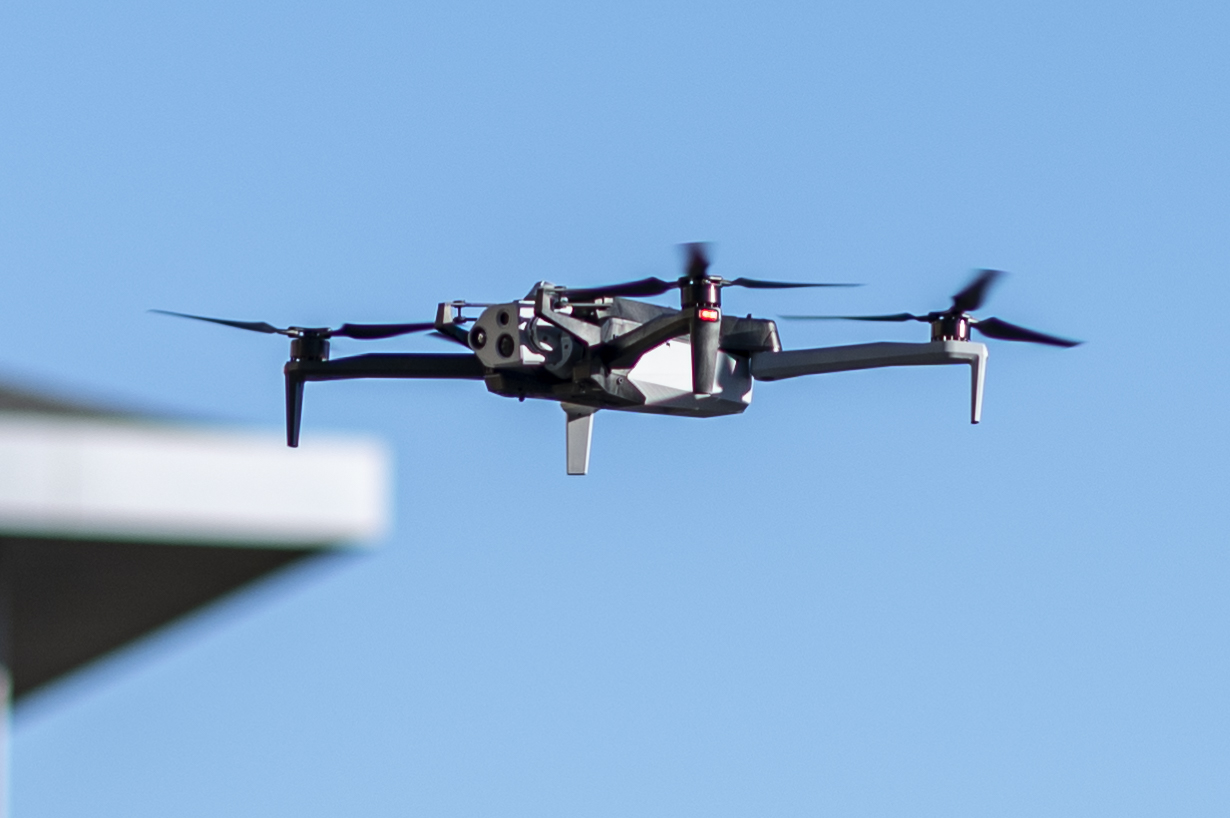
- Skydio X10 Gen 1 in flight

General information
- Type: Camera drone
- National origin: United States
- Manufacturer: Skydio; AeroArc
- Primary users: United States Army Spanish Army

History
- Manufactured: 2023–present
- Introduction date: September 2023

The Skydio X10 is an American teleoperated compact quadcopter drone produced by Skydio. Introduced in September 2023, the X10 is intended for both military and civilian use and has also been produced in India by AeroArc.

== Design and development ==
The Skydio X10 was announced in September 2023. The drone is a quadcopter with a folding design which, according to Skydio, can be made flight ready from a backpack in 40 seconds. The X10's name derives from the drone's computing power being improved tenfold compared to its predecessor, the Skydio X2. The X10 also has an IP55 protection rating, is compatible with Skydio's "NightSense" zero-light autonomous flight system, and can be controlled using a 5G cellular connection, giving it a theoretically infinite range. Like the X2, the X10 was originally released in two variants; the X10 for civilian users and the X10D for military and government use. Unlike the baseline X10, the X10D is equipped with a multi-band radio, allowing it to operate in contested environments.

The drone was initially released with two interchangeable camera options; the VT300-Z and VT300-L. The VT300-Z features a 48-megapixel telephoto zoom camera, a 64MP narrow-angle camera, and a 640×512 Teledyne FLIR Boson+ thermal camera. The VT300-L, intended for low-light operations, swaps the telephoto zoom camera for a 50MP wide-angle camera with a 1-inch sensor and adds a 2800-lumen flashlight. A third option, the VT100-L, was released later with the flashlight, wide-angle, and narrow-angle cameras of the VT300-L, but without the thermal camera.

Several improvements were incorporated into the X10 and X10D throughout production. The X10/X10D Gen 2 replaced the original X10 (retroactively redesignated "Gen 1") in June 11, 2025. The Gen 2, which is externally distinguishable from its predecessor with its all-gray color scheme, features improved hardware enabling "bring your own plan" (BYOP) capabilities that allow users to connect the drone to a larger variety of wireless carriers. At launch, Skydio announced plans to add 5G Standalone capabilities to the X10 Gen 2 in the future. Other improvements include changes to minimize battery corrosion for dock-based aircraft and improved rubber plugs for external ports. In October 2025, Skydio replaced the original aluminum/stainless steel "REV 1" propellers with the new low-friction plastic "REV 2" model with a stabilizing hoop on the hub. The change was made due to the REV 1 model not meeting performance expectations and causing accelerated wear to the propeller hub. The company planned to ship REV 2 replacements for all aircraft originally shipped with REV 1 propellers by November 2025.

== Variants ==
X10
Baseline variant for enterprise and first responder users with an IP55 protection rating, "NightSense" autonomous flight system, and a 5G cellular connection. The following model numbers refer to differences in internal hardware and capabilities:
- Model SR47PI and SR47PCI: Equipped with infrared light obstacle sensors and is compatible with both visible and IR light versions of the NightSense system.
- Model SR47PV and SR47PCV: Equipped with visible light obstacle sensors and is only compatible with the visible light version the NightSense system.
- Model SR47PC9V: FirstNet-capable variant of the X10.
Two primary variants of the enterprise X10 exist:
- X10 Gen 1, original variant.
- X10 Gen 2, improved variant with "bring your own plan" (BYOP) capabilities and an all-gray color scheme.
X10D
Militarized variant with a multi-band radio. Built in Gen 1 and Gen 2 variants similar to the X10.
Trishul
Variant of the X10 series produced in India by AeroArc.

== Operators ==
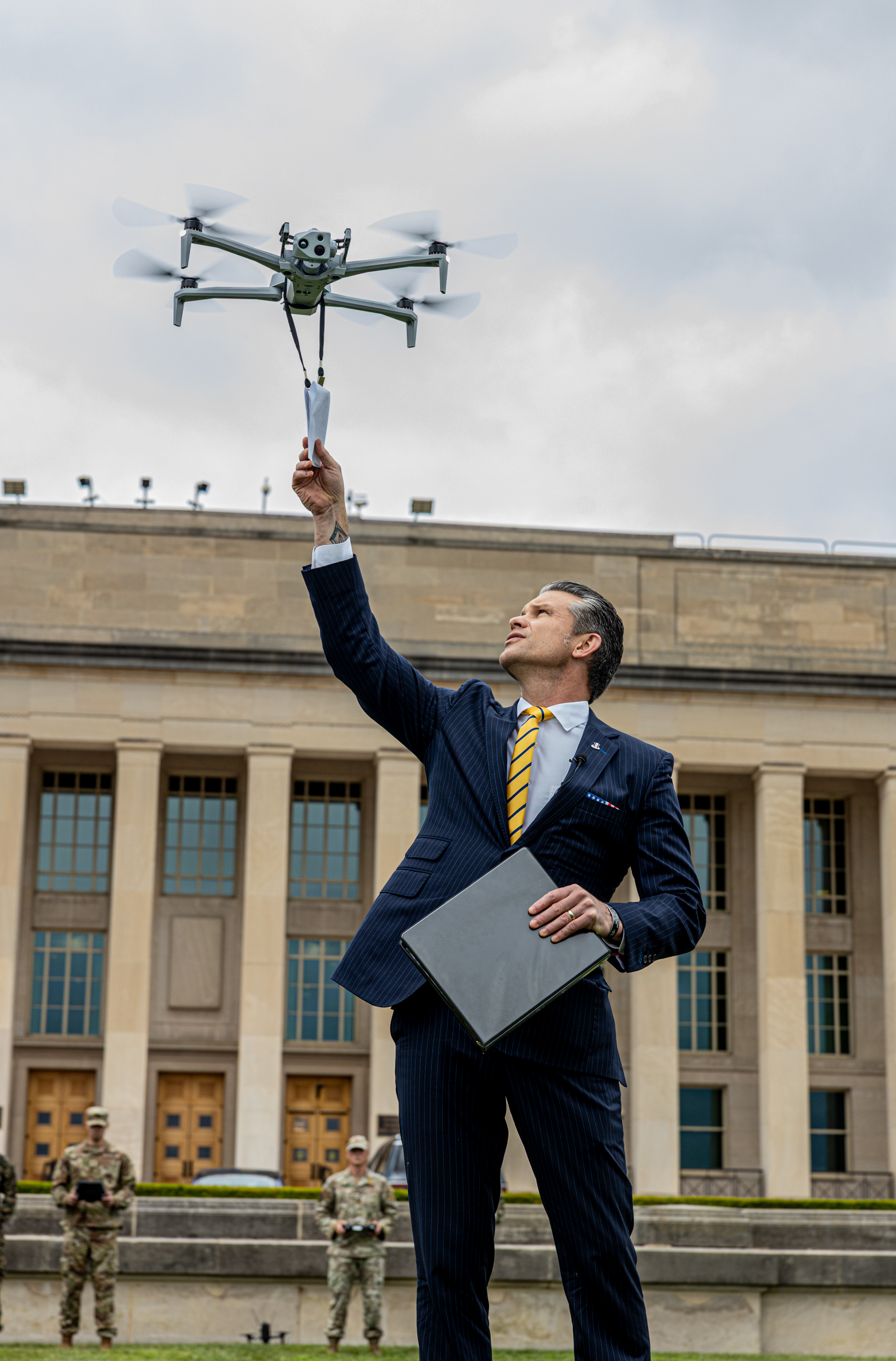
US Secretary of Defense Pete Hegseth with a Skydio X10D during the announcement of Executive Order 14307.

=== Law enforcement operators ===
United States

- The Las Vegas Metropolitan Police Department acquired the X10 to replace its X2 fleet in 2024, which was determined to be inadequate for the LVMPD's needs. Skydio first proposed the X10 to the LVMPD chief in 2023. The proposal was immediately forwarded to Ben Horowitz, who subsequently donated money to purchase the drones. Horowitz's involvement in the deal, and his donations to the LVMPD as a whole, caused controversy as critics stated they bypassed normal equipment procurement processes and lacked transparency.
- On July 6, 2026 the Montgomery County Police Department announced the X10 would replace its DJI Matrice 300 RTK fleet for its Drone as First Responder Program, with 12 drones stationed in pairs at 6 launching sites.

Canada

- On June 10, 2026, the Vancouver Police Department announced they would deploy 6 X10's after testing for several weeks and have approval from Transport Canada

=== Military operators ===
Philippines
The X10 was among the several drone models donated to the Philippine Coast Guard by Australian government in April 2025 for use in the West Philippine Sea.
Portugal

- The Portuguese Army began receiving its first units of the Skydio X10D unmanned aerial system in 2026.

Spain

- The Ministry of Defence chose the X10D in February 2025 for use by the Spanish Army.

United States

- The United States Army introduced the X10D in January 2025 as a replacement for its RQ-28A (Tri-Service designation of the Skydio X2D). On June 25, 2025, the 173rd Airborne Brigade conducted the Army's first grenade drop from a UAV using an X10D at the Grafenwoehr Training Area, having been inspired by similar tactics used by Ukraine in its war with Russia.

== Specifications (Skydio X10 with VT300-L) ==
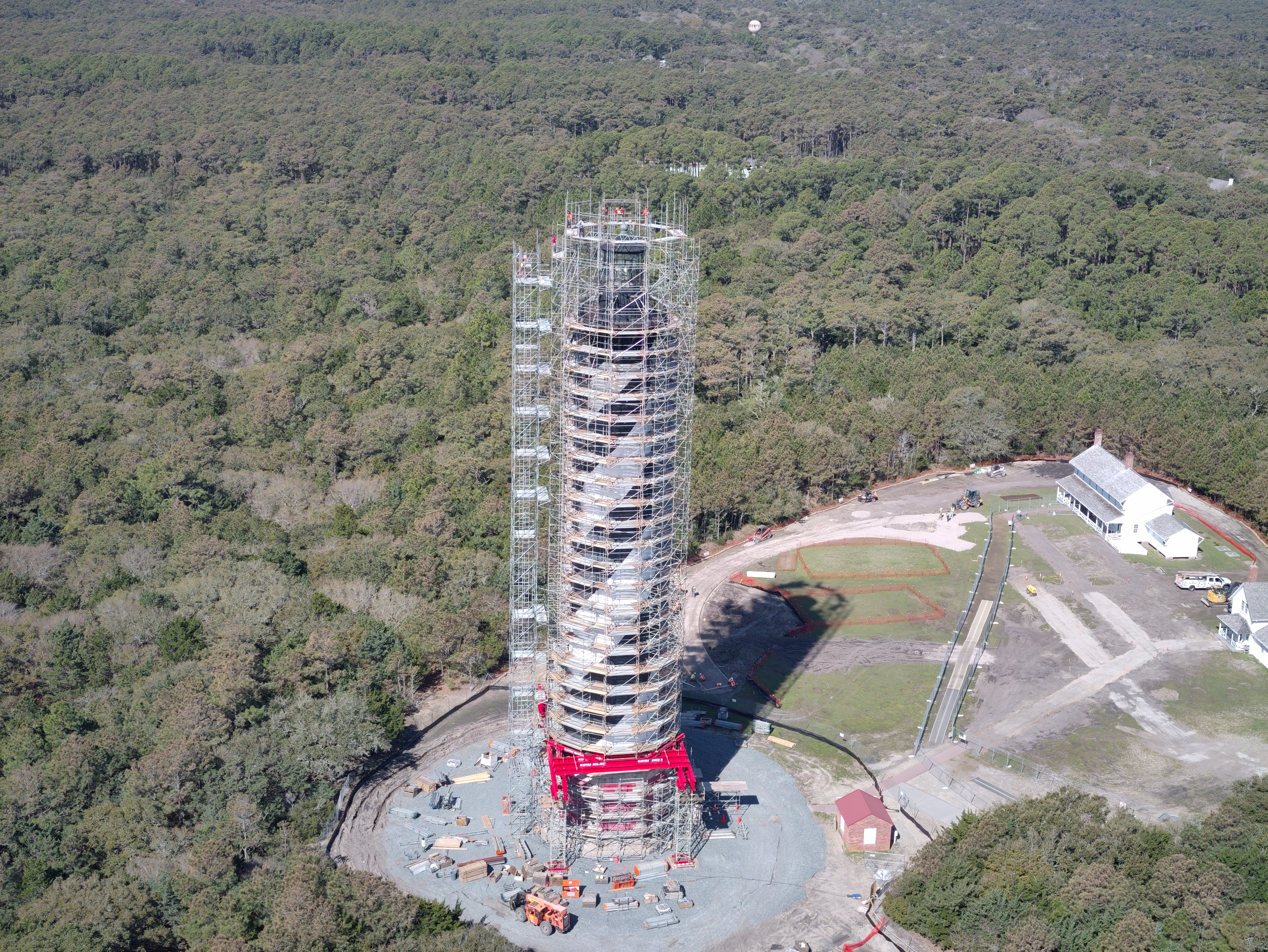
Aerial photo of the Cape Hatteras Lighthouse during its 2024 restoration, taken with a Skydio X10.

Data from Skydio X10 operator manual

General characteristics

- Length: 2 ft 1.6 in (0.650 m)
- Width: 2 ft 7.1 in (0.790 m)
- Empty weight: 4.65 lb (2.11 kg) without 5G module, with battery
- Max takeoff weight: 5.49 lb (2.49 kg)
- Battery capacity: 18.55V 8419 mAh (156.17Wh)

Performance

- Maximum speed: 45 mph (72 km/h, 39 kn) at sea level
- Range: 7.5 mi (12 km, 6.5 nmi) (wireless range)
- Endurance: 40 minutes
- Service ceiling: 15,000 ft (4,600 m) without payload
- Rate of climb: 1,200 ft/min (6 m/s)
- Maximum wind resistance: 28 mph (46.1 km/h)
- Operating temperature: -4°F (-20°C) to 113°F (45°C)

Avionics

- Cameras:

- 50.3MP 1" CMOS wide-angle camera
- 64MP 1/1.7" CMOS narrow-angle camera
- 640×512 Teledyne FLIR Boson+ thermal camera

- GNSS compatibility: GPS, Galileo, GLONASS, BeiDou
- Processors:

- Nvidia Jetson Orin
- Qualcomm QRB5165

- Encryption: AES-256

== See also ==
- History of unmanned aerial vehicles

Aircraft of comparable role, configuration, and era

- DJI Matrice
- DJI Mavic
- Parrot Anafi

Related lists

- List of unmanned aerial vehicles
