= Intel Falcon 8 =

German/American camera drone

Falcon 8
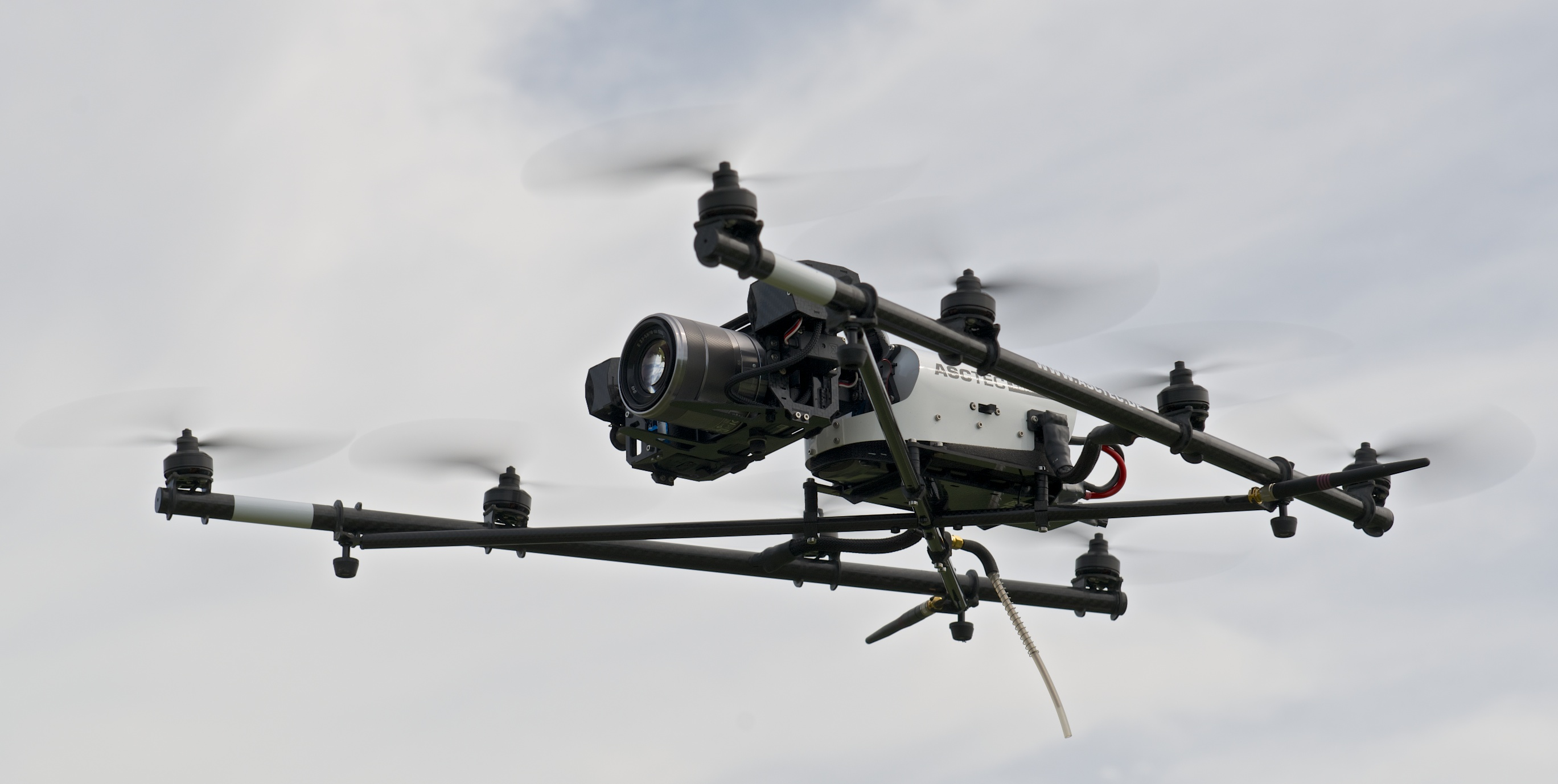
- AscTec Falcon 8

General information
- Type: Camera drone
- National origin: Germany/United States
- Manufacturer: Ascending Technologies (later Intel)

History
- Manufactured: 2009–present
- Introduction date: 2009

The AscTec (later Intel) Falcon 8 is a series of octocopter camera drones originally released by the German company Ascending Technologies (AscTec) in 2009. Intel continued to produce the Falcon 8 after acquiring Ascending Technologies in 2016.

== Design and development ==
Serial production of the Falcon 8 began in 2009. The Falcon 8 is an octocopter intended for aerial photography, with its eight motors being arranged on a V-shaped frame to keep them out of the camera's view. The drone has a stabilized gimbal which is compatible with cameras from several manufacturers, including Sony (α7R, α6000, HDR-PJ810E, and NEX-5N), Sigma (DP1 Merrill), and Panasonic (Lumix DMC-TZ71), as well as a FLIR Tau 640 thermal camera. The Falcon 8 is capable of carrying a 0.75 kg (1.7 lb) payload has a maximum flight time of 20 minutes with a standard payload. By January 2016, the Falcon 8 was capable of using the AscTec Trinity autopilot system with a triple-redundant inertial measurement unit. That same month, Ascending Technologies was acquired by Intel. That July, Intel demonstrated a modified Falcon 8 with RealSense cameras at the Farnborough International Airshow, during which it performed a visual inspection of an Airbus airliner.

In October 2016, Intel released an updated version as the Falcon 8+ for the North American market. The Falcon 8+ has a payload capacity of 0.8 kg (1.8 lb) and is controlled with a weatherproof Intel Cockpit controller. Among the payloads compatible with the Falcon 8+'s three-axis gimbal include a Sony α7R camera with a Sonnar T* FE 35mm f/2.8 ZA lens. Power is provided by two Powerpack 4000 batteries, giving the drone a maximum flight time of 26 minutes with no payload or 16 minutes with a maximum payload.

== Variants ==
Falcon 8
Original variant with a payload capacity of 0.75 kg (1.7 lb). Later versions have an AscTec Trinity autopilot system with a triple-redundant IMU. Powered by a 6250 mAh Powerpack 6250 battery, giving it a flight time of 20 minutes with a standard payload. Released in 2009.
Falcon 8+
Improved variant with a payload capacity of 0.8 kg (1.8 lb) and powered by two Powerpack 4000 batteries, giving it a maximum flight time of 26 minutes with no payload or 16 minutes with a maximum payload. Released in October 2016.

== Specifications (Falcon 8+) ==
Data from Intel Falcon 8+ UAS User Manual

General characteristics

- Capacity: 1.76 lb (0.8 kg) payload
- Length: 2 ft 6.2 in (0.768 m)
- Width: 2,680 ft 5 in (817 m)
- Height: 524 ft 11 in (160 m)
- Empty weight: 2.65 lb (1.2 kg)
- Max takeoff weight: 6.17 lb (2.8 kg)
- Battery: 2× Intel Powerpack 4000
- Powerplant: 8 × 125W brushless DC electric motor
- Propellers: 2-bladed, 8.0 in (0.2032 m) diameter

Performance

- Maximum speed: 40 mph (64.8 km/h, 35 kn)
- Range: 0.62 mi (1.0 km, 0.54 nmi)
- Endurance: 26 minutes (no payload), 16 minutes (max payload)
- Service ceiling: 13,123 ft (4,000 m) above sea level
- Rate of climb: 1,936 ft/min (10 m/s)
- Maximum wind resistance: 35.8 miles per hour (57.6 km/h)
- Operating temperature: 23°F (-5°C) to 113°F (45°C)

Avionics

- GNSS compatibility: GPS, GLONASS

== See also ==
- History of unmanned aerial vehicles

Aircraft of comparable role, configuration, and era

- DJI Inspire
- DJI Matrice
- Skydio X2

Related lists

- List of unmanned aerial vehicles
