= DJI Ronin =

Series of motorized camera stabilization gimbals

DJI Ronin 如影
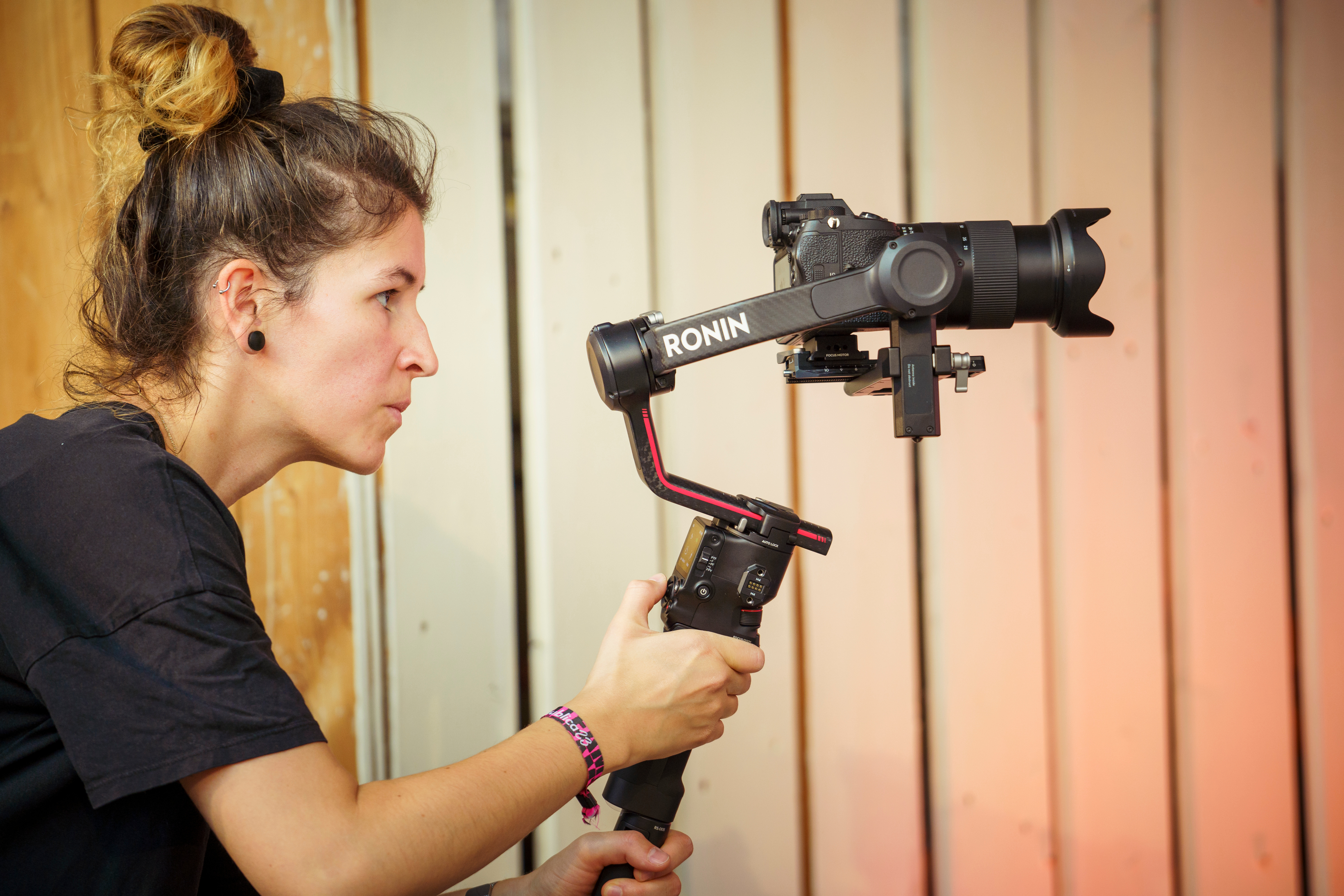
- Also known as: Ronin M, MX, 2, S, SC, RS2, RSC2, 4D, RS3, RS3 Pro, RS4, RS4 Pro
- Developer: DJI
- Manufacturer: DJI
- Released: 2014 (first generation)

DJI Ronin (Chinese: 如影; pinyin: Rúyǐng) is a series of motorized camera stabilization gimbals and digital movie cameras manufactured by DJI, a Chinese drone manufacturer.

== Ronin ("Ronin 1") ==
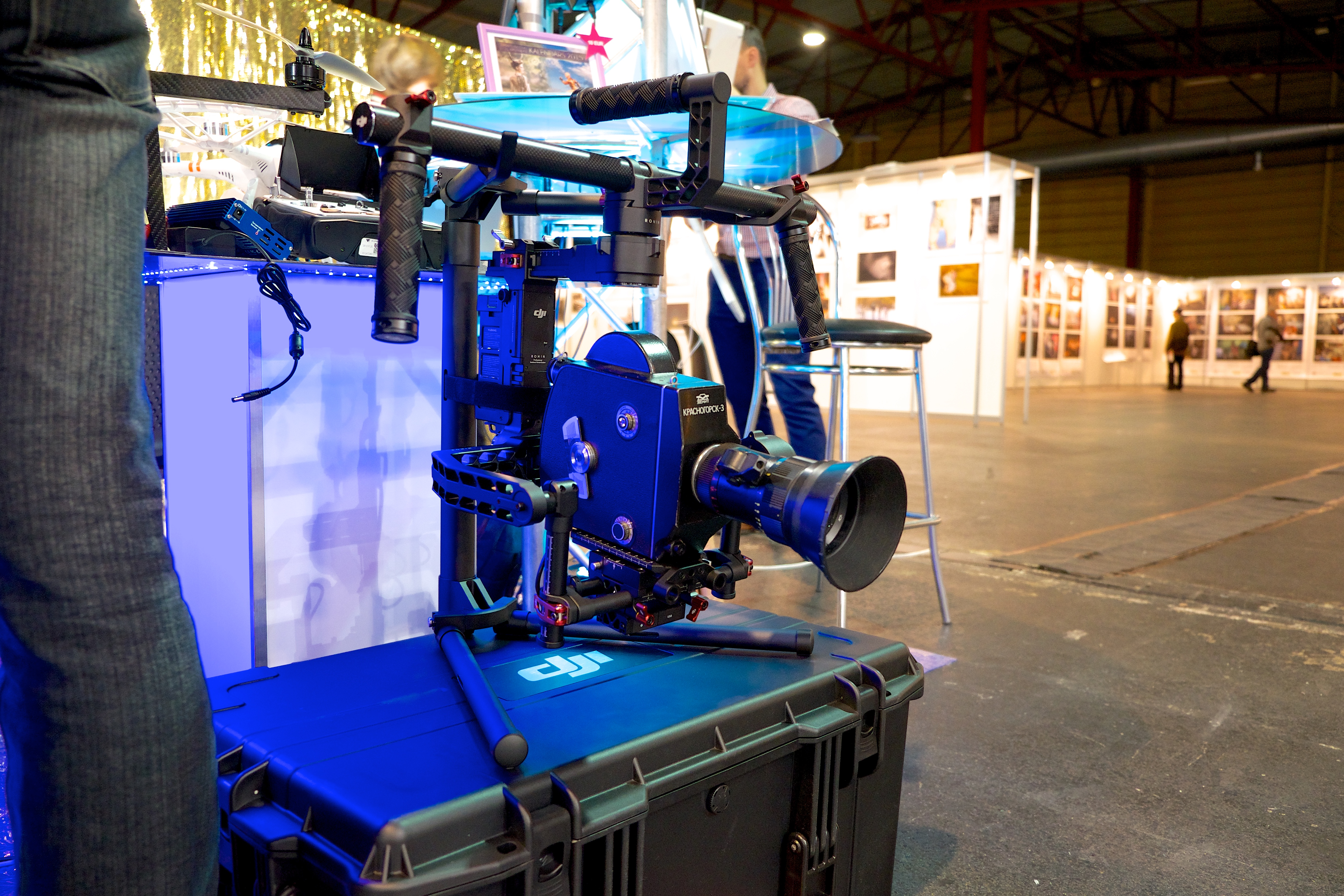
DJI Ronin (first-generation)

The Ronin or "Ronin 1," announced on June 25, 2014, was DJI's first entry into the market of digitally stabilized camera gimbals. This version had a max payload of 16lbs (7.25kg), accommodating the heavier prosumer-level cinema and DSLR cameras of the time.

Due to similarities in the naming convention of Ronin products, DJI presently refers to this model as the "Ronin 1," as do some aftermarket suppliers.

== Ronin M ==
The Ronin M effectively reduced the overall weight and dimensions of the original Ronin 1 into a similar package. The new model introduced an updated 1580mAh battery while maintaining backwards compatibility with the higher capacity battery of the Ronin 1.

== Ronin MX ==
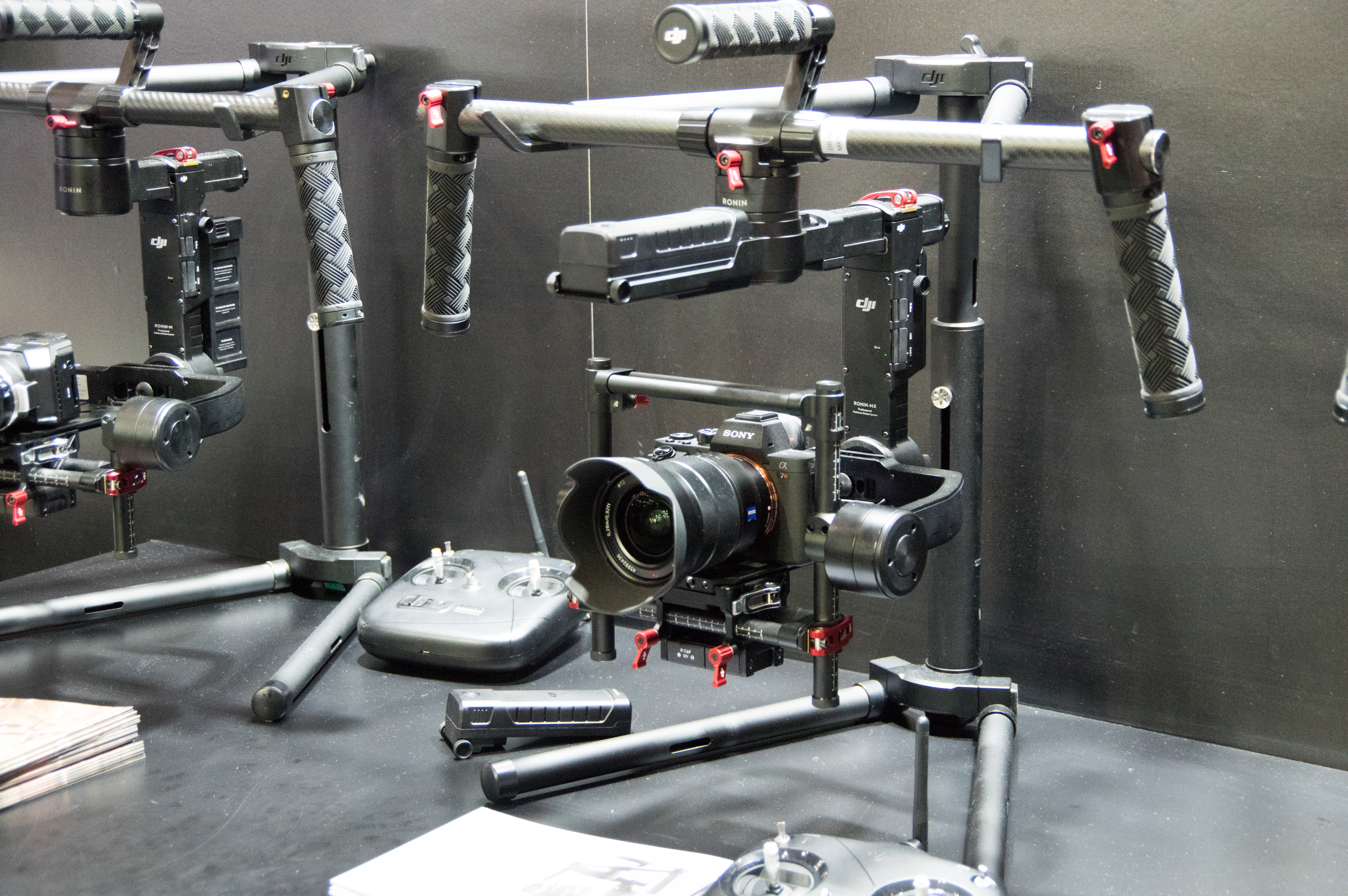
DJI Ronin MX

The MX was released as an action gimbal designed for higher G-forces and aerial videography, with more powerful motors than the standard M model.

This model features a slightly higher payload of 10lbs(4.5kg) over the M when used conventionally. This payload drops to 8.49lbs(3.85kg) when the gimbal is used in conjunction with DJI's M600 hexacopter.

== Ronin 2 ==
The Ronin 2 is the largest of the Ronin series, designed for large-scale professional cinema applications, with a capacity of up to 30 pounds. The Ronin 2 uses a monopod halo ring instead of handles, providing multiple grip positions and mounting points.

== Ronin S ==
The Ronin S the first Ronin to incorporate the popular, single-hand form factor. The S incorporated ergonomics that would become common across the Ronin lineup.

The S gained DJI's Force Mobile and ActiveTrack 3.0 features during a firmware update released in September 2019, giving it the capability to auto-track selected facial features by using a smartphone camera connected through the DJI Ronin app.

== Ronin SC ==
The SC is a downsized version of the S (Ronin S "Compact") for lighter mirrorless cameras. The SC is equipped with a smaller battery and load capacity than the S, but shares similar ergonomics.

Like the S, it gained firmware support for Force Mobile and ActiveTrack 3.0 in 2019.

== Ronin-S2, SC2 (RS 2/RSC 2) ==
=== RS 2 ===
The RS 2 is the first DJI Ronin-series gimbal to include a built-in touchscreen and focus wheel.

When equipped with DJI's optional RavenEye system, the RS 2 is also capable of ActiveTrack directly from the onboard LCD screen.

=== RSC 2 ===
The RSC 2 is a budget adaption of the RS 2, sharing many of the same features. Like earlier Ronin SC, the reduced form factor is designed primarily for mirrorless cameras. Unlike the RS 2, the RSC 2 requires an external phone for ActiveTrack.

It also has a built-in battery on a non-swappable grip.

== Ronin 4D (6K and 8K) ==
The 4D is the first complete cinema camera integrated into the Ronin series. The design merges DJI's gimbal technology onto a camera body with an iso-elastic Z-axis arm. The 4D also debuted DJI's optional LiDAR system for focusing and tracking objects on screen.

Both the 6K and 8K versions were announced on October 20, 2021. The 6K began shipping in February 2022, followed by the 8K in December 2023.

An additional accessory for the 4D, the Ronin 4D Flex, was announced in March 2023. The Flex allows the 4D's lens and gimbal to be removed from the main body of the camera and reconnected by a 2-meter long flex cable; providing better access in tight locations.

== Ronin-S3, S3 Pro, S3 Mini (RS 3/RS 3 Pro/RS 3 Mini) ==
=== RS 3 ===
The RS 3 replaces the RSC 2, incorporating many of the features from the RS 2, including the built-in touchscreen LCD.

=== RS 3 Pro ===
The RS 3 Pro replaces the previous RS 2 model, carrying over and improving existing features, including a larger (1.8") LCD screen for controlling the gimbal and for ActiveTrack, and a switch for changing shooting modes.

Like the Ronin 4D cinema camera, the RS 3 Pro introduces support for an optional LiDAR system for following and focusing on subjects automatically.

=== RS 3 Mini ===
The RS 3 Mini is designed to provide a lightweight alternative to the larger RS-series, capable of handling a payload of up to 4.4 pounds. It also offers native physical mounting on the gimbal body for vertical video shooting.

== Feature comparison ==
Model	Model Number	Announced	Availability	Type	Active Track	LiDAR compatibility	Unit Weight	Max Payload	Battery	Battery Model
Ronin ("Ronin 1")	CP.ZM.000078	June 25, 2014	Discontinued	Two-handle gimbal	No	No	9.26lbs/4.20kg	16.00lbs/7.25kg	14.8V 3400mAH 4S LiPo	CP.ZM.000099
Ronin M	CP.ZM.000144	April 23, 2015	Discontinued	Two-handle gimbal	No	No	5.07lbs/2.30kg	8.00lbs/3.60kg	14.8V 3400mAH 4S LiPo; 14.4V 1580mAh LiPo	CP.ZM.000099; CP.ZM.000226
Ronin MX	CP.ZM.000377	April 17, 2016	Discontinued	Two-handle gimbal + aeronautical	No	No	6.11lbs/2.77kg	10.00lbs/4.50kg	14.4V 1580mAh LiPo	CP.ZM.000226
Ronin 2	CP.ZM.00000008.02	April 23, 2017	Current	Halo gimbal	No	No	14.00lbs/6.3kg	30.00lbs/13.60kg	22.8V 4280mAh LiPo	CP.BX.000202 (TB50)
Ronin S	CP.ZM.00000103.02	January 7, 2018	Discontinued	Single-handle gimbal	Yes, w/firmware update	No	4.00lbs/1.81kg	7.93lbs/3.60kg	14.4V 2400mAh Li-Ion	CP.RN.00000004.01 (BG37)
Ronin SC	CP.RN.00000040.01; CP.RN.00000043.01 ("Pro")	July 7, 2019	Current	Single-handle gimbal	Yes, w/firmware update	No	2.38lbs/1.08kg	4.41lbs/2.00kg	14.4V 2450mAh Li-Ion	CP.RN.00000047.01 (BG18)
Ronin-S2 (RS 2)	CP.RN.00000094.01	October 15, 2020	Current	Single-handle gimbal	Yes, with RavenEye	No	3.77lbs/1.71kg	10.00lbs/4.50kg	15.4 V 1950mAh 4S LiPo	CP.RN.00000103.03 (BG30)
Ronin-SC2 (RSC 2)	CP.RN.00000121.01	October 15, 2020	Current	Single-handle gimbal	Yes, with RavenEye	No	3.40lbs/1.54kg	6.61lbs/3.00kg	7.2V 3400mAh 2S Li-Ion	Integrated, not replaceable
Ronin 4D 6K	CP.RN.00000176.01	October 20, 2021	Current	Unified gimbal + camera	Yes, integral	Yes	10.30lbs/4.67 kg (overall)	Not applicable	22.8V 4280mAh LiPo	CP.BX.000202 (TB50)
Ronin 4D 8K	CP.RN.00000177.01	October 20, 2021	Current	Unified gimbal + camera	Yes, integral	Yes	10.30lbs/4.67 kg (overall)	Not applicable	22.8V 4280mAh LiPo	CP.BX.000202 (TB50)
Ronin-S3 (RS 3)	CP.RN.00000216.01	June 15, 2022	Current	Single-handle gimbal	Yes, with RavenEye	No	3.26lbs/1.48kg	6.60lbs/3.00kg	7.2V 3000mAh 18650 Li-Ion	CP.RN.00000226.01 (BG21)
Ronin-S3 Pro (RS 3 Pro)	CP.RN.00000218.01	June 15, 2022	Current	Single-handle gimbal	Yes, with RavenEye	Yes	3.59lbs/1.74kg	10.00lbs/4.50kg	15.4 V 1950mAh 4S LiPo	CP.RN.00000103.03 (BG30)
Ronin-S3 Mini (RS 3 Mini)	CP.RN.00000294.01	January 10, 2023	Current	Single-handle gimbal	No	No	1.75lbs/795 g	0.8-4.4lbs/0.4-2.0 kg	7.2V 2450 mAh 18650 2S Li-Ion	Integrated, not replaceable
