= DJI Inspire =

Chinese camera drone

Inspire 悟
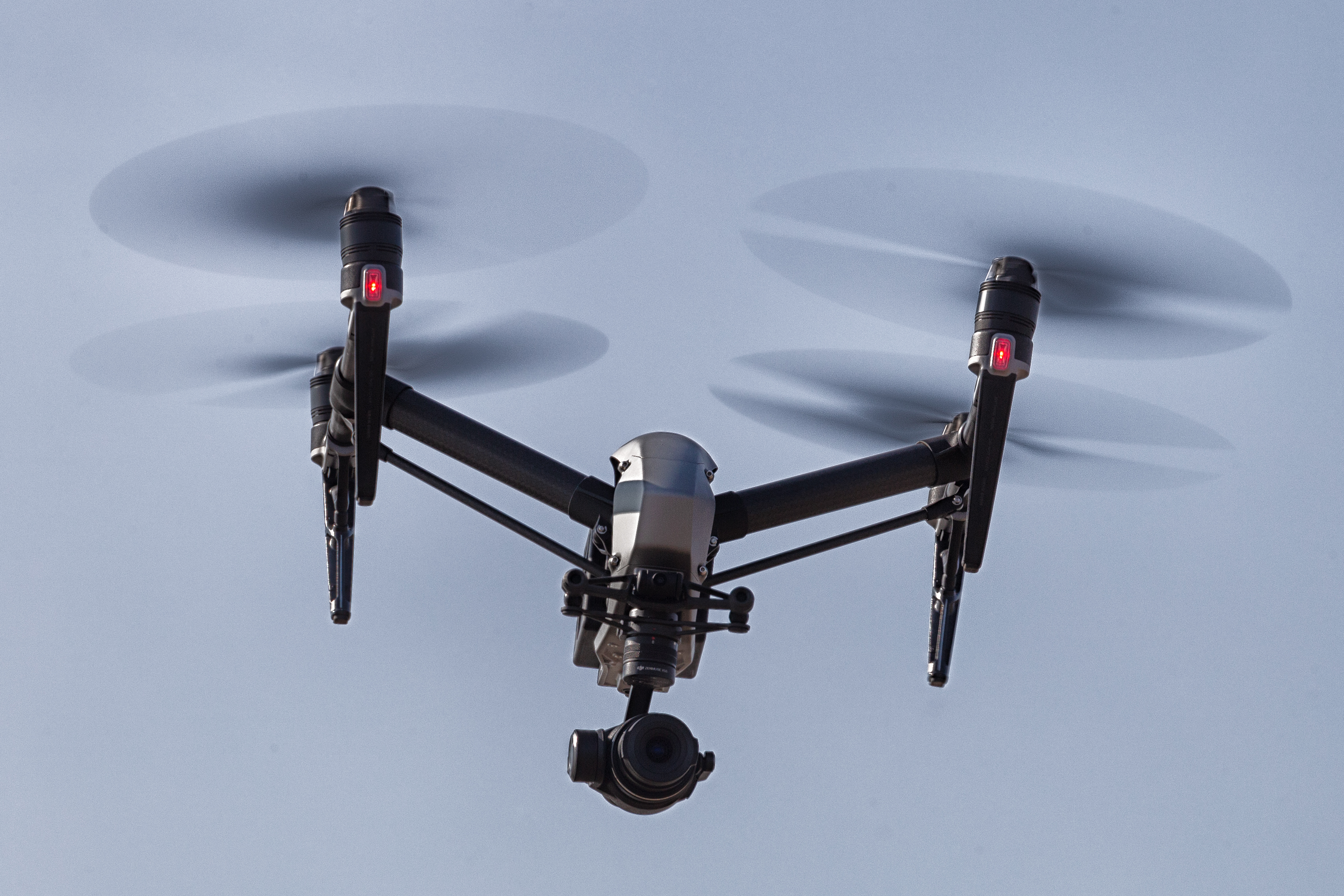
- Inspire 2 in flight

General information
- Type: Camera drone
- National origin: China
- Manufacturer: DJI

History
- Manufactured: 2014–present
- Introduction date: November 2014

The DJI Inspire (Chinese: 悟; pinyin: Wù) is a series of quadcopter camera drones released by the Chinese technology company DJI.

== Design and development ==
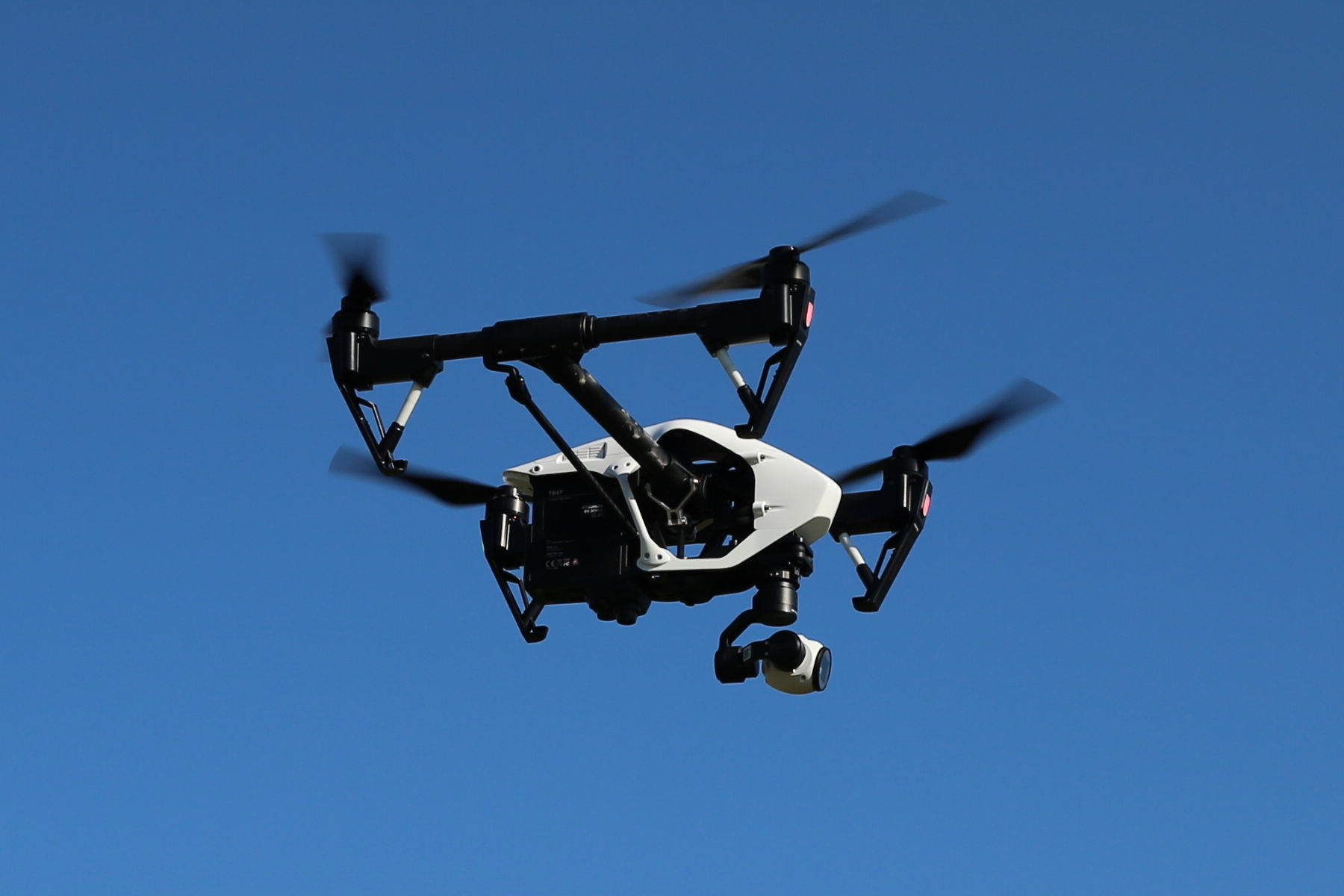
Inspire 1 with a Zenmuse X3 camera

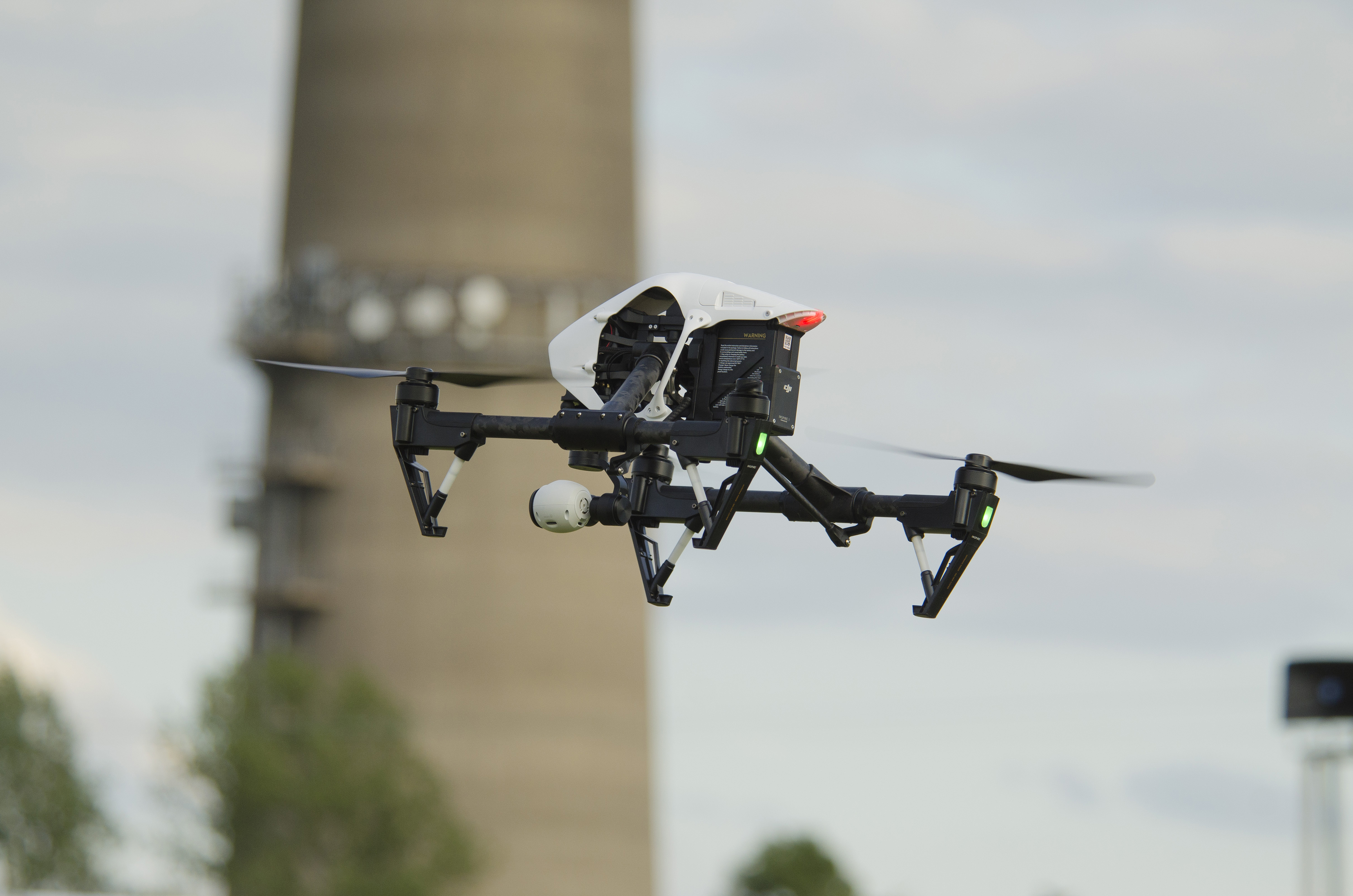
Inspire 1 in landing configuration

DJI announced the first model, the Inspire 1, on 13 November 2014. Built upon lessons learned from the Phantom 2 and Spreading Wings series, the Inspire 1 was designed for professional cinematography and features a Zenmuse X3 gimbal/camera (Note: The camera/gimbal combo is known as the Zenmuse X3, while the camera itself is an FC350.) with a 12-megapixel 1/2.3" CMOS Sony Exmor sensor capable of shooting 4K video at 30 frames per second (FPS). The arms and landing legs retract upward in flight, allowing the three-axis camera gimbal to rotate 360 degrees without obstruction. The drone also features an "Optical Flow" system, which uses a downward-facing camera and ultrasonic sensors to navigate indoors, and is powered by four 350 KV Model 3510 motors driving Model 1345 or 1345s propellers. Power is provided by a 4500 mAh TB47 battery, though an optional 5700 mAh TB48 battery was also available, giving the drone a maximum flight time of about 18 minutes. The drone was designed to be future-proof, with the camera being detachable to allow upgrades as DJI camera technology improved. Two such upgrades were announced in September 2015, when DJI released the 16MP Zenmuse X5 and X5R Micro Four Thirds cameras; the latter differing in that it is capable of shooting raw images. Another upgrade came in November 2015, when DJI swapped the original 350 KV motors for new 420 KV Model 3510H motors with an updated propeller locking system; a change intended to improve performance and controllability while not impacting flight time.

Several additional versions of the Inspire 1 were also released, including the Inspire 1 Raw and Pro. The Raw and Pro variants are respectively equipped with the Zenmuse X5R and X5 camera/gimbal as standard. Both are also powered by Model 3510H motors driving Model 1345T propellers and have a maximum flight time of about 15 minutes with a standard TB47 battery, increased to about 18 minutes with the optional TB48. The Inspire 1 Pro Black Edition was released in January 2016, replacing the standard white body shell and controller, with matte black versions. The Inspire 1 V2.0 retained the Zenmuse X3 and Model 3510 motors of the original Inspire 1, but uses Model 1345T propellers.

The Inspire 2 was released alongside the Phantom 4 Pro in November 2016. The body of the drone is made of a magnesium-aluminum alloy, and features forward, upward, and downward-facing obstacle avoidance sensors. The Inspire 2 is powered by four Model 3512 motors driving 1550T propellers, and features a dual-battery system with two 4280 mAh TB50 batteries. The drone was offered without a camera or with a 20MP 1" CMOS Zenmuse X4S or a 20.8MP 3/4" CMOS Zenmuse X5S camera/gimbal; the latter being capable of raw imaging and having a swappable lens. Flight time with a Zenmuse X4S is 27 minutes, while the X5S reduces it to 25 minutes. The Zenmuse X7 is also compatible with the Inspire 2, though with a reduced flight time of 23 minutes. In addition to the main camera, the Inspire 2 also has a forward-facing first-person view (FPV) camera allowing the drone to be operated by two individuals; a pilot (using the forward-facing camera) and a main camera operator. The Inspire 2 ProRes and Inspire 2 L were offered alongside the baseline Inspire 2, differing in that the former has Apple ProRes pre-activated while the latter has both ProRes and CinemaDNG. DJI announced in January 2022 that the Inspire 2 series would be discontinued the following month in favor of the Inspire 3.

Announced in April 2023, the Inspire 3 features a more aerodynamic design than its predecessors. The Inspire 3 retains the two-person control capability of the Inspire 2, but features an FPV camera with a night vision sensor and a Zenmuse X9-8K Air primary camera/gimbal with interchangeable lenses capable of shooting 8K CinemaDNG video at 25 FPS or 8K ProRes RAW video at 75 FPS; both requiring a license key to use. The drone features an O3 Pro video transmission system, omnidirectional collision avoidance, GNSS and real-time kinematic (RTK) positioning capabilities with GPS, Galileo, and BeiDou satellites, and is powered by four Model 3511s motors driving either Model 1671 standard propellers or Model 1676 high-altitude propellers. Two 4280 mAh TB51 batteries give the Inspire 3 a flight time of about 28 minutes with the landing legs extended or 26 minutes when retracted.

== Variants ==
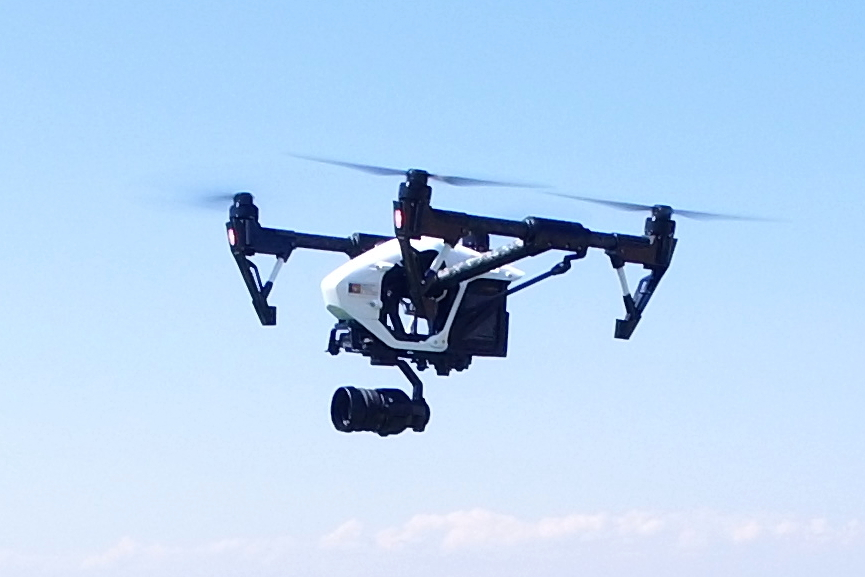
Inspire 1 with a Zenmuse X5 camera

Inspire 1
Company designation Model T600, also known as the Inspire 1 V1.0. First model with a removable Zenmuse X3 camera/gimbal with a 12MP 1/2.3" CMOS Sony Exmor sensor, 350 KV Model 3510 motors driving Model 1345 or 1345s propellers. Power is provided by a 4500 mAh TB47 battery or optional 5700 mAh TB48 battery, giving it a flight time of about 18 minutes. Introduced in November 2014. Optional 16MP Zenmuse X5 and X5R camera/gimbals were offered starting in September 2015. 420 KV Model 3510H motors were made standard in November 2015.
Inspire 1 Raw
Company designation Model T600. As Inspire 1 but with a Zenmuse X5R camera/gimbal and Model 3510H motors driving Model 1345T propellers as standard. Flight time is about 15 minutes with a standard TB47 battery or about 18 minutes with a TB48.
Inspire 1 Pro
Company designation Model T600. As Inspire 1 Raw but with a Zenmuse X5 camera/gimbal as standard. Flight time is about 15 minutes with a standard TB47 battery or about 18 minutes with a TB48.
Inspire 1 Pro Black Edition
As Inspire 1 Pro but with a matte black body shell and controller. Introduced in January 2016.
Inspire 1 V2.0
Company designation Model T601. As early Inspire 1 with Zenmuse X3 camera/gimbal and Model 3510 motors but with Model 1345T propellers.
Inspire 2
Company designation Model T650A. Improved model with a magnesium-aluminum alloy structure, a forward-facing FPV camera, Model 3512 motors driving 1550T propellers, and forward, upward, and downward-facing obstacle avoidance sensors. Drone could be bought without a primary camera, a 20MP 1" CMOS Zenmuse X4S camera/gimbal, a 20.8MP 3/4" CMOS Zenmuse X5S camera/gimbal, or a Zenmuse X7 camera/gimbal. Dual 4280 mAh TB50 batteries give the drone a flight time between 23 and 28 minutes depending on the camera installed. Released alongside the Phantom 4 Pro in November 2016.
Inspire 2 ProRes
Company designation Model T650A. As Inspire 2 but with Apple ProRes pre-activated.
Inspire 2 L
Company designation Model T650A. As Inspire 2 but with Apple ProRes and CinemaDNG pre-activated.
Inspire 3
Company designation Model T740. Improved model with a more aerodynamic design, a night vision FPV camera, a Zenmuse X9-8K Air primary camera/gimbal, an O3 Pro video transmission system, omnidirectional collision avoidance, GNSS and real-time kinematic (RTK) positioning, and Model 3511s motors driving either Model 1671 standard propellers or Model 1676 high-altitude propellers. Dual 4280 mAh TB51 batteries give the drone a flight time of about 28 minutes with the landing legs extended or 26 minutes when retracted. Released in April 2023.

== Operators ==
=== Government operators ===
United States

- New York City Police Department introduced the Inspire 1 for training and testing purposes in 2018.

=== Military operators ===
Chile

- Chilean Army introduced the Inspire 2 in 2018.

Colombia

- Colombian Air Force introduced the Inspire 1 in 2016. Two were still in service as of 2019.

France

- French Armed Forces used the Inspire as of 2019.

Lithuania

- Lithuanian Land Forces used the Inspire as of 2019.

=== Non-state operators ===
Ukraine

- Azov Regiment introduced the Inspire 1 in 2016. The Inspire was still in Ukrainian paramilitary service as of 2019.

== Specifications (Inspire 3) ==
Data from

General characteristics

- Width: 0.695 m (2 ft 3 in) diagonal, landing gear raised
- Empty weight: 3.995 kg (9 lb) with camera
- Max takeoff weight: 4.310 kg (10 lb)
- Battery: 2 × 4280 mAh 23.1V lithium-ion TB51 Intelligent Flight Battery
- Powerplant: 4 × DJI 3511s brushless motor
- Propellers: 2-bladed DJI 1671 standard propellers or DJI 1676 high-altitude propellers

Performance

- Maximum speed: 94 km/h (58 mph, 51 kn)
- Endurance: ≈28 minutes with landing gear lowered, ≈26 minutes with landing gear raised
- Service ceiling: 3,800 m (12,500 ft) with standard propellers or 7,000 m (23,000 ft) with high-altitude propellers
- Rate of climb: 8 m/s (1,600 ft/min)

Avionics

- Camera:

- 8K Zenmuse X9-8K Air gimballed camera with 35 mm (1.4 in) full-frame CMOS sensor
- 1920×1080 first-person view camera with night vision sensor

- GNSS/RTK compatibility:

- GPS
- Galileo
- BeiDou

- Transmission system: O3 Pro

== See also ==
- History of unmanned aerial vehicles

Aircraft of comparable role, configuration, and era

- Intel Falcon 8

Related lists

- List of unmanned aerial vehicles
