= Palacio de Justicia de Caracas =

Government complex in Caracas, Venezuela

Coordinates: 10.50193°N 66.91350°W

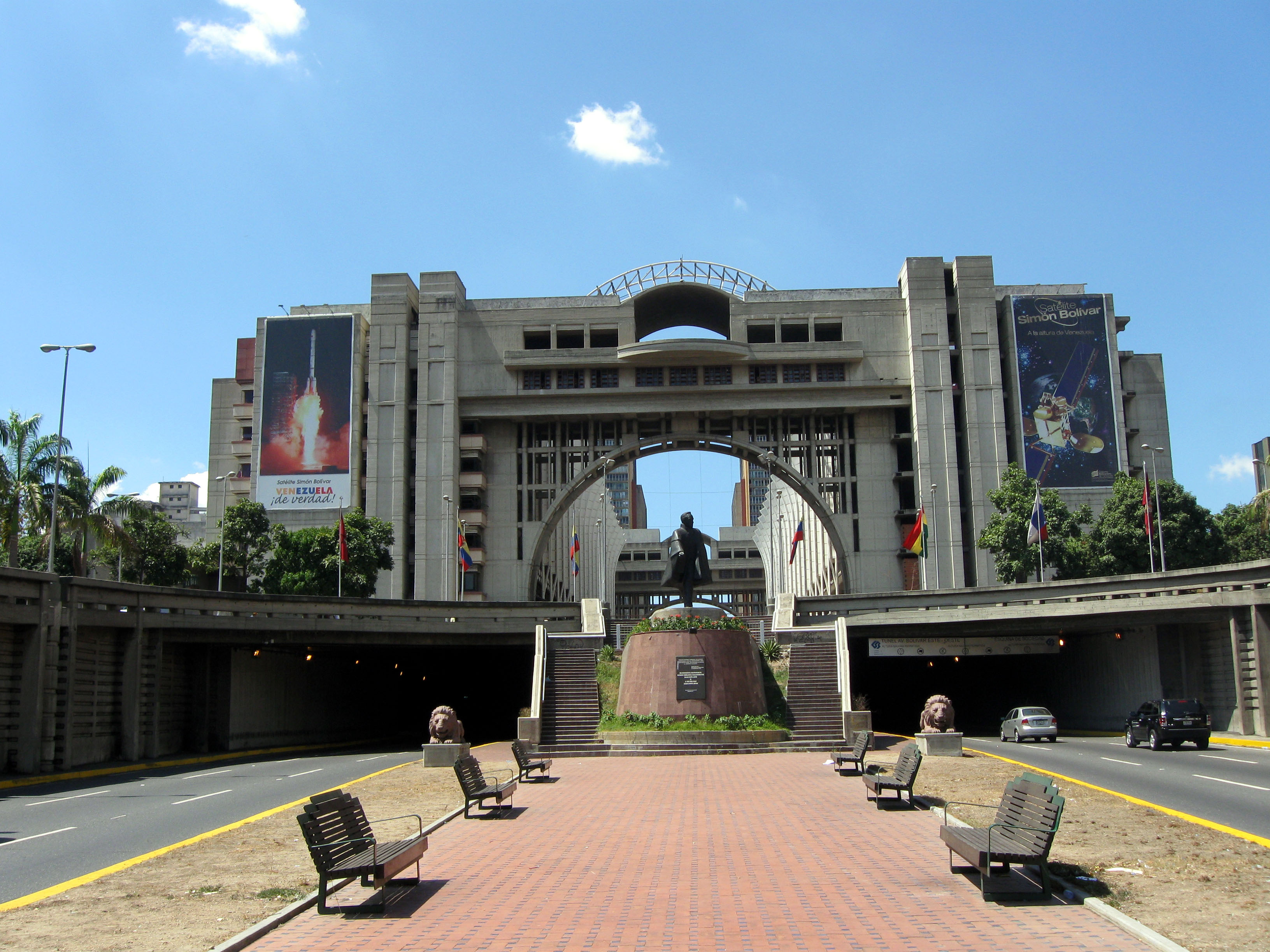
Palacio de Justicia de Caracas

The Palacio de Justicia de Caracas is a government complex straddling Avenida Bolívar in Caracas, Venezuela. It houses numerous courtrooms and judicial facilities serving the metropolitan area. Designed by Carlos Gómez de Llarena in 1983, it became functional in 2004.

== History ==
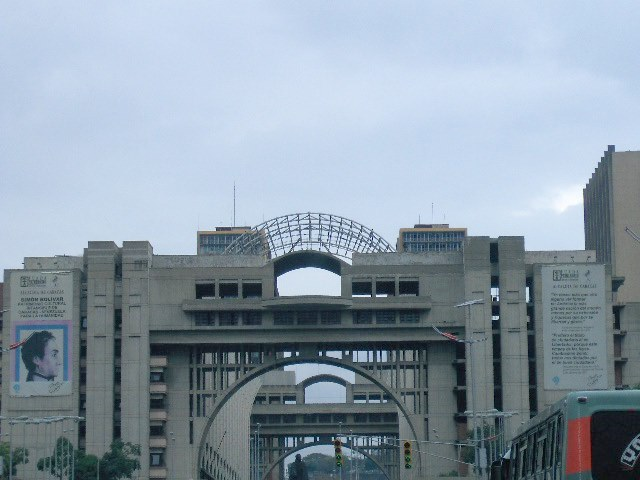
A close view of the Palacio de Justicia de Caracas

The principal aspect of the plans put forward by the architect Carlos Gómez de Llarena in 1983 was to provide an area for pedestrians above the Avenue Bolívar highway. By rebuilding the Centro Simón Bolívar and developing law courts and administrative buildings on either side of the highway, he was able not only to complete the complex by means of a bridge but could also add galleries, parks and recreational areas, opening up new possibilities for the city. The design of the Palacio itself consisted of two five-storey concrete buildings. A square metal frame covered by a vaulted area of 140,000 m^{2} (1,500,000 sq ft) also provided for a 5,000 m^{2} (54,000 sq ft) plaza. The two buildings are known as the Edificio Sur (South Building) or Cruz Verde and the Edificio Norte (North Building) or Camejo, separated by the Plaza de la Justicia.

In June 1992, only the South Building had been completed. The northern part and the square were completed in 1993 but were opened only in 2004. In 2004, it was announced that construction could not resume as funding was insufficient for completion. In the following year, there was a proposal to build a different structure for the courts in another part of town, but this proposal was rejected outright.

In March 2004, a 50-year lease agreement was signed with the Simon Bolívar Centre providing for the complex to be rebuilt exclusively for judicial use. It was jointly funded to the extent of 15 billion bolivars: the Supreme Court contributed 8 billion bolivars and the Bolívar Centre contributed the balance of 7 billion bolivars.
