= Meteomatics =

Swiss weather technology company

Meteomatics AG
- Type: Private
- Industry: Weather
- Founded: March 20, 2012; 14 years ago in St. Gallen, Switzerland
- Founder: Martin Fengler
- Headquarters: St. Gallen, Switzerland
- Area served: Worldwide
- Website: meteomatics.com

Meteomatics AG is a private Swiss weather technology company headquartered in St. Gallen. Meteomatics was founded by German mathematician Dr. Martin Fengler in 2012.

Meteomatics manufactures weather drones that fly up to 6 km to collect data from the mid and low levels of the atmosphere. The company also provides meteorological consulting services and forecast and historical weather data through an API. In 2022, Meteomatics launched EURO1k, a weather model that covers Europe with a resolution of 1 km.

== Technology ==
=== Meteodrones ===
Meteomatics started developing Meteodrones, which are weather drones, in 2013. Meteodrones are small flying weather stations capable of gathering pressure, temperature, humidity, wind direction, and wind speed in the lower 6 km of the atmosphere. Whilst remotely sensed data from satellites, radar and ceilometers are available for this altitude range, in situ observations are considered the most reliable by meteorologists. Operational challenges associated with aircraft missions (which are expensive and hence sporadic) and radiosondes (which cannot be controlled during flight) leave an in situ observational gap to be filled.

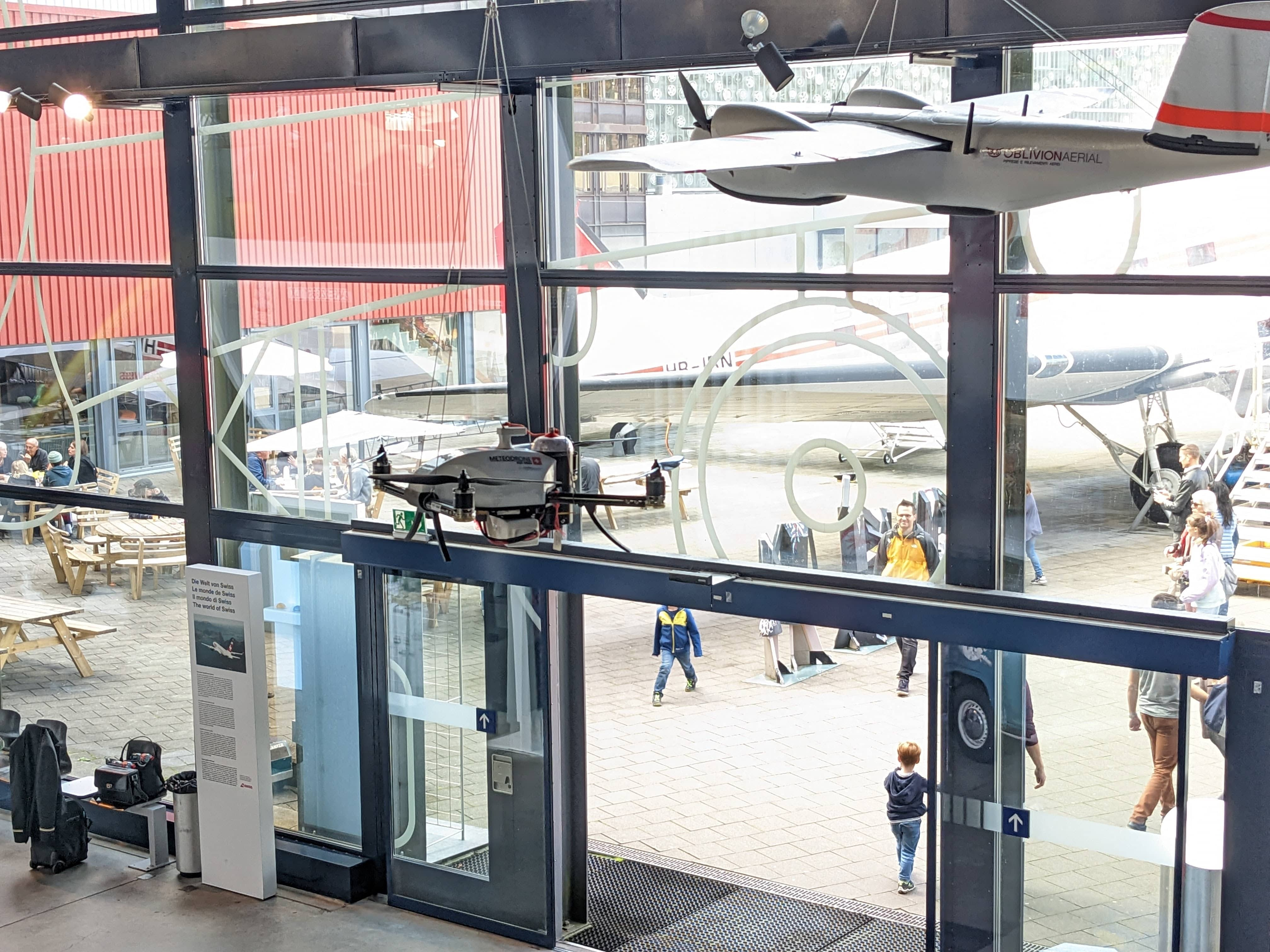
SUI-9999 Meteodrone exhibited at the Swiss Museum of Transport in Lucerne.

Meteodrones measure vertical profiles at a single location, collecting temperature, humidity, barometric pressure, and wind data. Heated rotor systems prevent propeller icing, which allows equipped drones to fly through fog, clouds, and rain. The drone flights can be carried out manually or autonomously from a container equipped with recharging capabilities.

Campaigns in association with the Federal Office for Meteorology and Climatology (MeteoSwiss) have demonstrated the feasibility of assimilating drone measurement data into a regional weather model.

In 2015, the Swiss Federal Office of Civil Aviation granted Meteomatics permission to fly Meteodrones within clouds and fog, to operate beyond visual line of sight, and to fly up to 6 km above ground level.

In 2022, Grand Forks Air Force Base initiated Meteodrone operations to support extended flight endurance of uncrewed aircraft systems. In 2025, the United States Navy began using Meteodrones to support aircraft takeoffs, landings and in-flight operations from moving vessels. In 2026, the National Oceanic and Atmospheric Administration announced a pilot project to make Meteodrone data available to the National Weather Service through the National Mesonet Program.

In October 2022, the Swiss Museum of Transport in Lucerne added the SUI-9999 Meteodrone to its permanent Aviation exhibition.

=== Weather API ===
Meteomatics provides global forecast and historical weather data through a RESTful API and a WMS/WFS-compatible interface.

The Swiss broadcasting company SRF and the German weather forecasting website www.wetter.de use Meteomatics' weather data to inform its weather forecasts.

=== European Weather Model–EURO1k ===
In October 2022, Meteomatics presented its European weather model, EURO1k, at the Meteorological Technology World Expo. EURO1k covers the European continent with a resolution of 1 km.

== See also ==
- Weather drone
- Numerical weather prediction
- Weather forecasting
- Remote sensing
- MeteoSwiss
- National Weather Service
- National Oceanic and Atmospheric Administration
