= Weather drone =

Weather sensing unmanned aerial vehicle

A weather drone, or weather-sensing uncrewed aerial vehicle (UAV), is an unmanned aircraft carrying sensors that collect thermodynamic and kinematic data from the mid and lower atmosphere (e.g. up to 6 km).

Weather drones are not yet used to support National Meteorological and Hydrological Services (NMHS) due to ongoing negotiations on UAVs' access to airspace and compliance with airspace regulations and technological development needed to meet the World Meteorological Organization's requirements.

Mostly, weather drones are deployed to support scientific research missions and industry-specific operations.

== History ==
=== Early proposals ===
The first recorded UAV for measuring atmospheric parameters was in 1970, when a "small radio-controlled aircraft [was used] as a measuring platform" for sharing meteorological measurement results. The study was supported by the Air Force Cambridge Research Laboratory and NASA, Wallops Station. The authors pointed out the need for "a simple, economical, controllable, and recoverable platform to carry meteorological sensors and instrumentation" and demonstrated that using a small, radio-controlled aircraft to collect weather data was both feasible and useful.

The second milestone in the development of weather drones was the prototype built by a group of researchers at the University of Colorado, sponsored by the U.S. Office of Naval Research (ONR) in 1993. The goal of the fixed-wing drone called Aerosonde was to enable weather data collection in remote and inaccessible regions of the globe. In 1995, further developments were conducted in Australia by Environmental Systems and Services (ES&S) Pty Ltd. having the Australian Bureau of Meteorology and Insitu Group as subcontractors. In 1999, all operations and development started to be undertaken by Australian-based Aerosonde Ltd. Since 2007, Aerosonde Ltd. has been part of the American industrial conglomerate Textron Inc. By 2016, the Aerosonde had become an intelligence, surveillance and reconnaissance (ISR) aircraft for military operations and its weather data collection feature, secondary.

=== Later development ===
In 2009, the American National Research Council published the report "Observing Weather and Climate from the Ground Up: A Nationwide Network of Networks", emphasizing the need for more adequate vertical mesoscale observation methods than radiosondes launched by weather balloons – the major system used to collect data from that atmospheric layer.

Since then, research programs focusing on weather drones have been increasing. The Center for Autonomous Sensing and Sampling at the University of Oklahoma is the most active group in this domain. Its researchers have been developing the CopterSonde and created the 3D Mesonet concept, a network of stations from which weather drones are launched every hour or two to collect data from the mesoscale.

In 2022, the US National Oceanic and Atmospheric Administration (NOAA) deployed a weather drone, the Area-I Altius-600, into a hurricane (Hurricane Ian) for the first time. The fixed-wing drone flew at lower heights (900 m - 1.3 km) inside the eye of the hurricane and into the eyewall to collect temperature, pressure, and moisture values.

Commercially available weather drones are scarce, with most of the market being supplied by Swiss company Meteomatics AG, developer and manufacturer of Meteodrones since 2013. In 2020, British company Menapia entered the market with MetSprite. In 2025, new ultralight rotary-wing platforms for boundary-layer sounding appeared that support both automatic profiling flights and balloon-assisted high-altitude deployments, followed by controlled descent and in-situ measurements.

== Types ==
=== Fixed-wing ===
The first weather drones used fixed-wings as it allowed researchers to implement technological advances from the piloted aircraft domain and to cover a larger area owing to its capacity to fly for long hours.

=== Rotary-wing ===
Rotary-wing weather drones are more popular because they are more versatile, easier to operate, and more suitable for vertical profiles than radiosondes which drift away.

== Advantages and limitations ==
In 2019, in cooperation with the French national meteorology service Météo-France, the World Meteorological Organization (WMO) organized the "WMO Workshop on Use of Unmanned Aerial Vehicles (UAV) for Operational Meteorology Report", the first workshop to discuss the application of weather drones. Amongst the participants, there were members of national meteorological centers, university research groups, and private companies.

The workshop discussions concluded that weather drones were useful to collect in-situ measurements from the boundary layer, closing the data gap and improving the numerical weather prediction accuracy. But a list of barriers needed to be addressed before weather drones could support national meteorological services, including:

- Lack of drone-specific regulations in national or region wide airspace regulation
- Limited level of automation of flight, refueling, and maintenance of fuel levels

Furthermore, resolving in-flight atmospheric icing and excessive wind resistance was also needed to ensure weather drones' safety and prevent loss. Since the development of the first Aerosonde, in the 1990s, research has been conducted to solve the issue of icing, which has caused the loss of many aircraft. In 2016, Swiss company Meteomatics was the first organization to develop a deicing system that heats the rotor blades whenever icing risk is detected.
