= Drone in a box =

Portable unmanned drone that emerges from a box

The drone in a box is an emerging form of autonomous unmanned aerial vehicle (UAV) technology that uses drones that deploy from and return to self-contained landing “boxes.”

Traditional drones, or UAVs, consist of both a non-manned aircraft and some form of ground-based controller. Drone-in-a-box systems, on the other hand, deploy autonomously from a box that also functions as a landing pad and charging base. After carrying out a pre-programmed list of instructions, they return to their “base” to charge and/or upload information.

Stand-alone drone-in-a-box systems are composed of three main components: a ground station that charges and shelters the drone, the drone itself, and a computer management system that allows the operator to interact with the system, including multiple drones. The ground station also provides battery charging and conducts health checks, and can be made of either metal or carbon fibre.

== History ==
=== Compass Dwell ===
The first attempted use of drone-in-a-box technology involving a ground state was by the US Air Force in 1968 using a high-altitude SIGINT project called Compass Dwell by the Air Force Security Services.

The AFSS hoped to solve two problems they faced with the Combat Dawn program: high RPV development costs and high operations and maintenance costs.

Compass Dwell was optionally piloted and designed to be disassembled and packed into an Air Force C-141 Starlifter Jet Transport, an effort to solve the deployment problems inherent in previous helicopter recovery methods.

This technology was an important way for the continental US to respond to any spot on the globe, enhancing the country's weapon systems.

Ultimately, Compass Dwell ended up not catching on because of foreign airspace control restrictions and the propeller design, which went against the Air Force's idea of a futuristic, unpiloted plane. The project was more exploratory than a legitimate candidate for adoption.

=== Modern UAVs ===
Automated commercial drone, Airobotics, is the first in the world to be granted authorization to fly fully automated drones without a pilot, allowing for Beyond Visual Line of Sight (BVLOS) commercial drone operations, in 2017. The first flight by an automated drone was performed by Airobotics’ fully automated drone system at Intel in 2017.

In 2018, multinational Italy-based manufacturer and distributor of electricity and gas Enel completed an industrial deployment of an autonomous drone-in-box system to carry out round-the-clock operations at their Torrevaldaliga Nord power plant facility.

In December 2020, The United States Air Force announced that the 60th Air Mobility Wing, 60th Security Forces Squadron, in conjunction with a commercial provider of autonomous drones, had developed and deployed the first automated drone-in-a-box monitoring and perimeter security system for a United States Air Force (USAF) installation

In September 2023, Airobotics was the first company in the world to receive Airworthiness Type Certification from the Federal Aviation Administration for its Optimus-1EX drone in a box.

== Uses ==
=== Drone as First Responder (DFR) ===
Real-world deployments of drone-in-a-box systems have demonstrated significant reductions in emergency response times compared to conventional patrol units. Dubai Police, operating through a centralised drone operations platform, has achieved average response times of under two and a half minutes — more than 50% faster than ground units — with a network of autonomous drone stations providing round-the-clock city coverage and over 25 operators coordinating missions from a single interface. The programme supports a wide range of public safety functions including surveillance, traffic management, and crowd monitoring, and has been cited as a benchmark model for large-scale DFR implementation. At major public events, drone-in-a-box systems have also been deployed for security operations; during the Eurovision Song Contest 2024 in Malmö, Swedish authorities integrated police drones alongside fixed camera systems to provide real-time situational awareness across multiple event zones, as part of one of the largest security operations in Swedish history. These deployments reflect the growing adoption of autonomous drone infrastructure by law enforcement agencies as a scalable, rapid-response tool for both routine operations and high-profile security events.

=== Mining ===
Drone-in-a-box (DIAB) platforms are being adopted at open-pit and other surface mines to automate routine, high-frequency aerial tasks such as stockpile volumetrics, pit and haul-road surveys, tailings-dam and pipeline inspections, blast-zone clearance, perimeter security and emergency response. Major OEMs promote the technology’s ability to keep personnel out of hazardous areas while providing more consistent data at lower cost than conventional piloted flights.

Early large-scale deployments include Anglo American’s Quellaveco copper mine in Peru, where a DJI-powered system now performs scheduled infrastructure inspections without an on-site pilot. In Western Australia, RocketDNA began piloting its SurveyBot (a DJI-Dock-based DIAB) at Rio Tinto’s Gudai Darri iron-ore mine in late 2024; the unit flies pre-programmed missions several times per day over Starlink links, uploading imagery to cloud photogrammetry software for volumetric and geotechnical reporting. RocketDNA reports that its DIAB fleet has logged more than 8,000 autonomous flights in its first year of operations—equivalent to roughly 150-200 flights per dock per month - demonstrating the high utilisation rates possible when take-off, landing and charging are fully automated.

=== Space ===
In 2021 NASA deployed the Perseverance rover to Mars with the Ingenuity drone attached to it. The Ingenuity drone was released on April 19, 2021, and completed its first flight. By operating the first mobile drone base in the Solar System NASA is able to survey a much larger area than possible with just the rover.

=== Military ===
Drone-in-a-box systems have been a focus of interest for militaries as a less expensive and less dangerous alternative to human-led communications, resupply, and offensive missions.

In January 2017, the Department of Defense and Strategic Capabilities Office completed a successful demonstration of an autonomous “swarm” of “micro-drones” at China Lake, California. In February 2017, the US Marine Corps ran a drone-in-a-box trial to test the viability of using both autonomous helicopters and smaller drones to resupply front-line troops without the need for a human pilot.

=== Sea and port terminals ===
Autonomous, drone-in-a-box systems have been used to survey the progress of construction and capture visuals during the construction of the Gulf Port in Haifa, Israel.

In 2018, CERTUS Port Automation signed an agreement to deploy the autonomous drone-in-a-box to enhance port security, becoming the first company in the sector to embrace the technology.

=== Security ===
Drone-in-a-box technologies have been used to bolster security in commercial and military applications, automatically deploying when alarms are tripped and providing close-up footage or carrying out scheduled patrols. In 2022, Lithuania-based DBOX partnered with one of the biggest security companies in the Baltics EUROCASH1 to trial such BVLOS flights.

Additionally, companies have used drone-in-a-box technologies to support security at large events

=== Agriculture ===
Companies have also embraced drone-in-a-box technology to survey farms and golf courses by using multispectral cameras that can be tuned to respond to specific light wavelengths, including some infrared. Using these cameras fixed on drone-in-a-box systems, drones can detect health-related changes in vegetation.

=== Utilities ===
Drones-in-a-box are used today to support operations at power plants, capturing aerial video and data to be streamed to personnel in real time. The scheduled missions can enable human/vehicle detection, alert operators to gas/water leaks and monitor for other maintenance abnormalities. In 2018, Israel-based Percepto partnered with Italian electricity and gas provider Enel to launch their on-site autonomous drone system at the Torrevaldaliga Nord power plant.
