= Unmanned aerial vehicle =

Aircraft without any human pilot on board

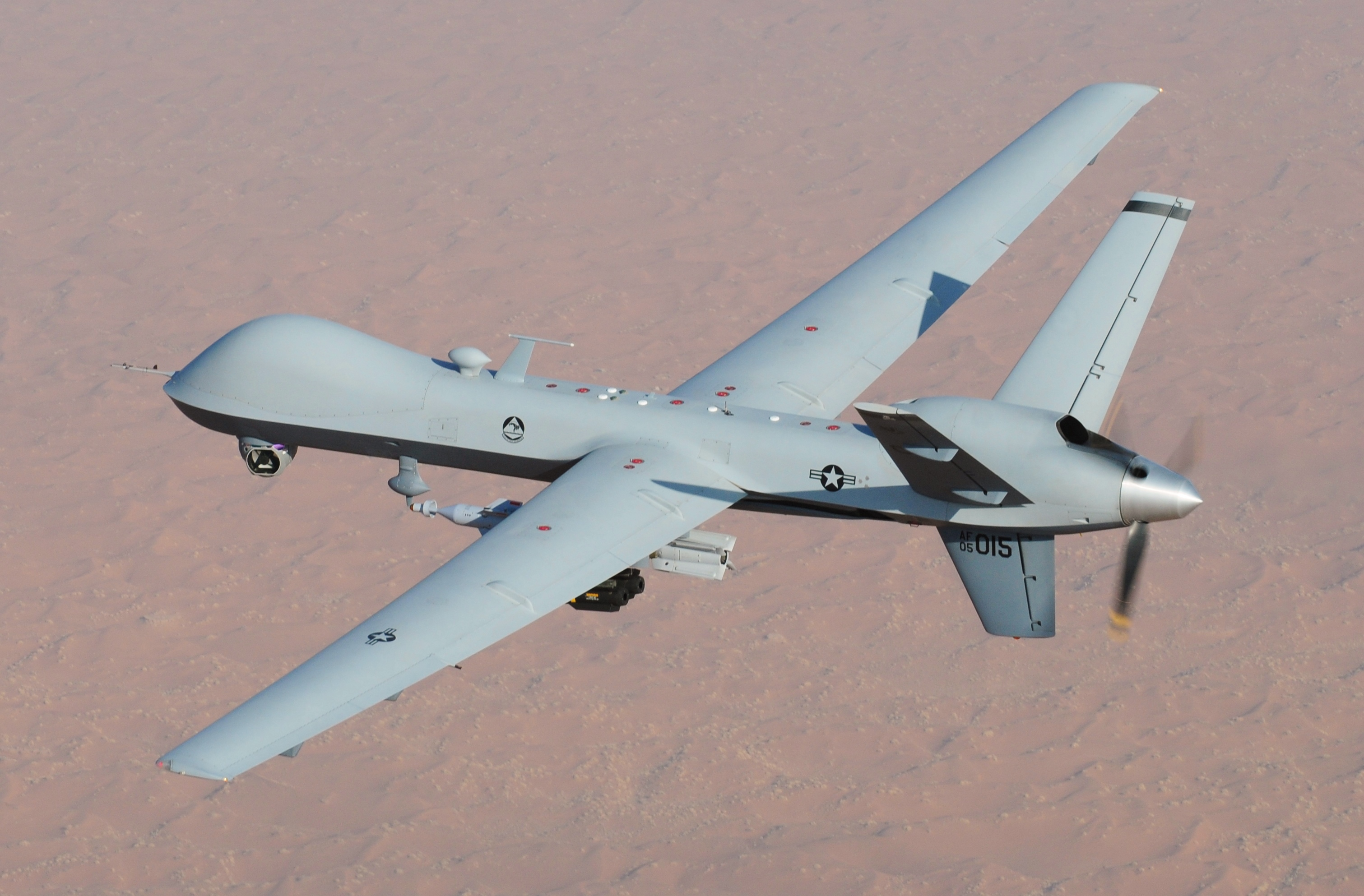
A General Atomics MQ-9 Reaper, an unmanned combat aerial vehicle used for both intelligence, surveillance, target acquisition, and reconnaissance (ISTAR) and drone strike missions.

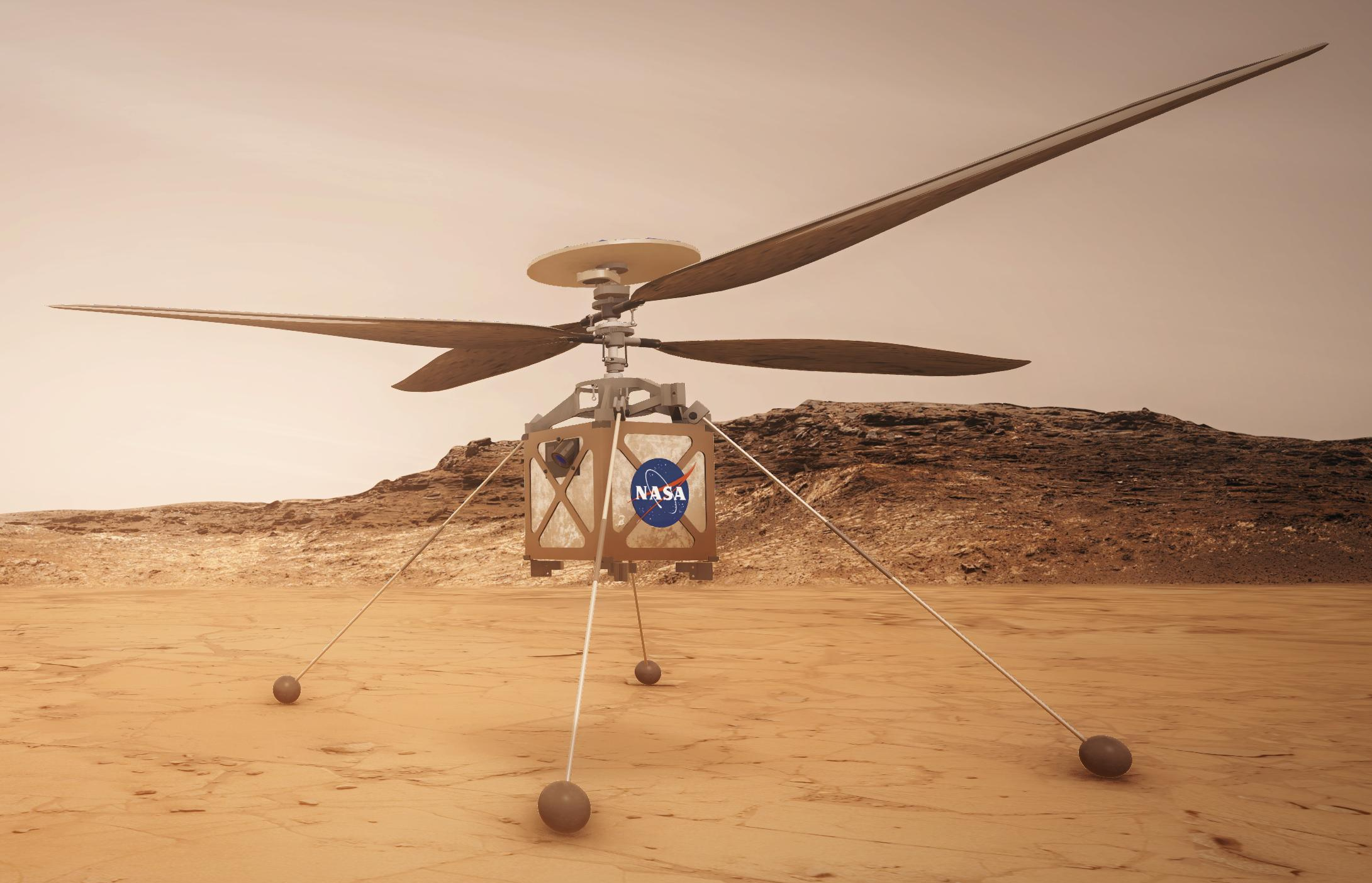
Ingenuity is an extraterrestrial autonomous UAV that performed the first powered controlled flight by an aircraft on another planet.

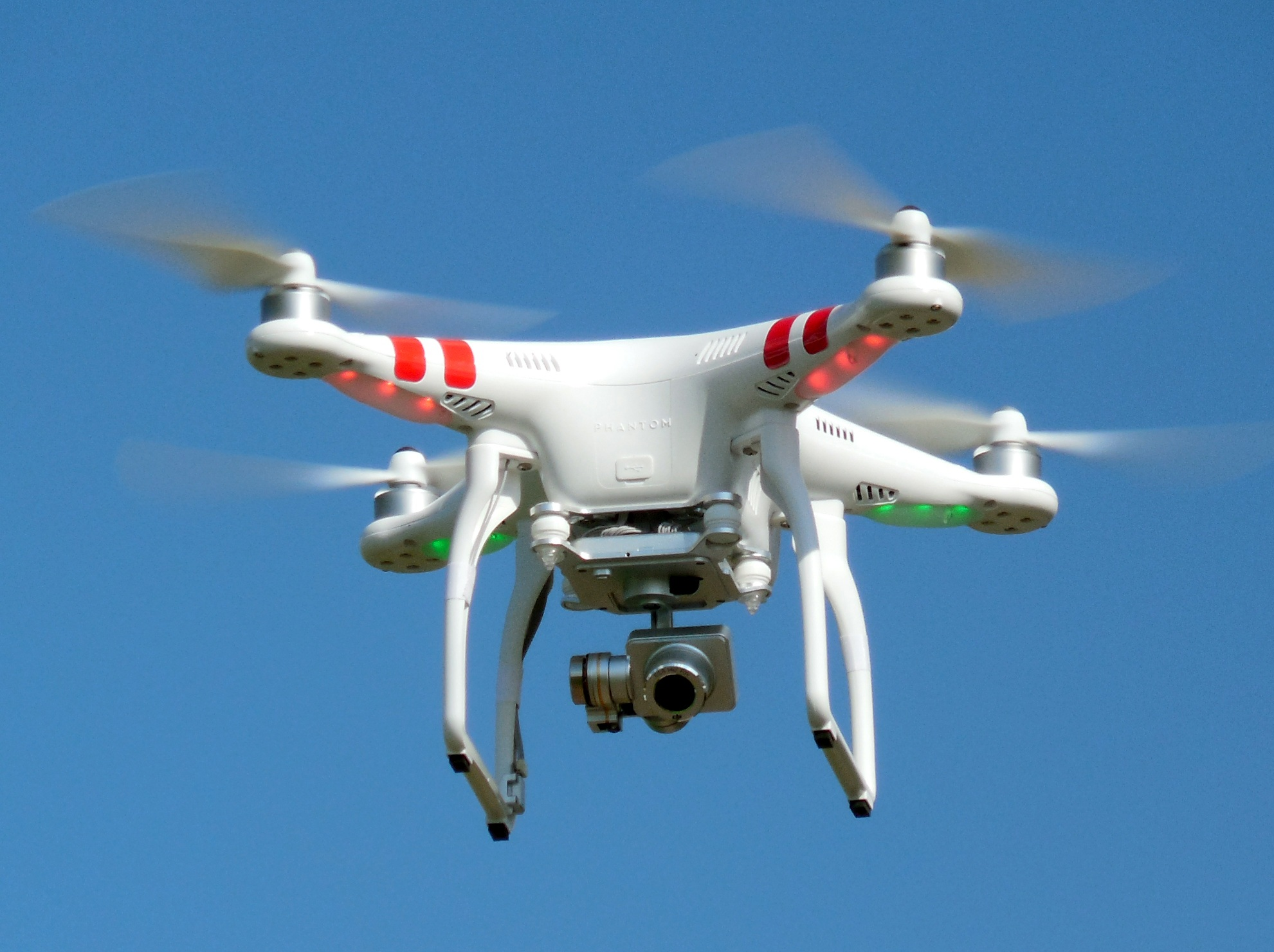
DJI Phantom, a small civilian quadcopter designed for commercial and recreational aerial photography. This type of craft is also used or adapted for surveillance by law enforcement and military organisations.

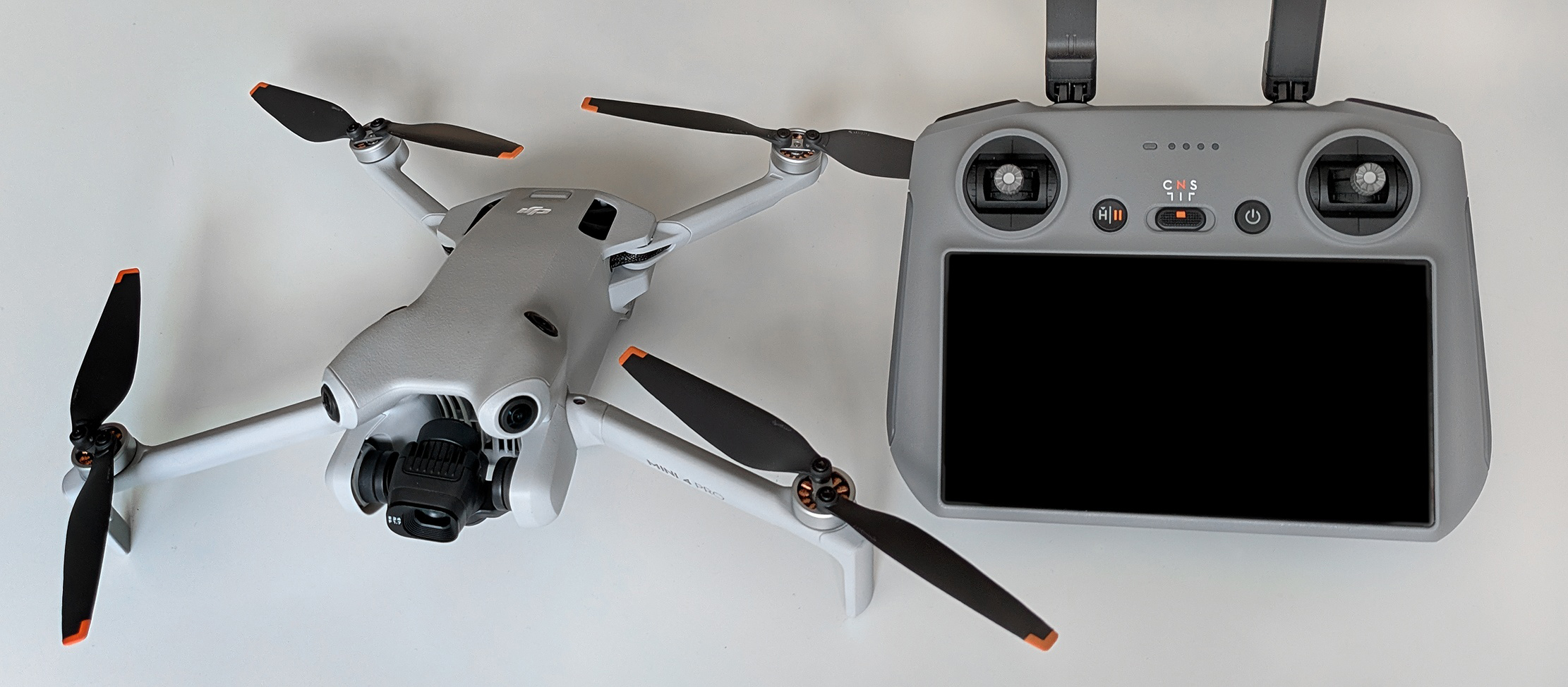
DJI Mini, a consumer-grade drone used for recreational flying

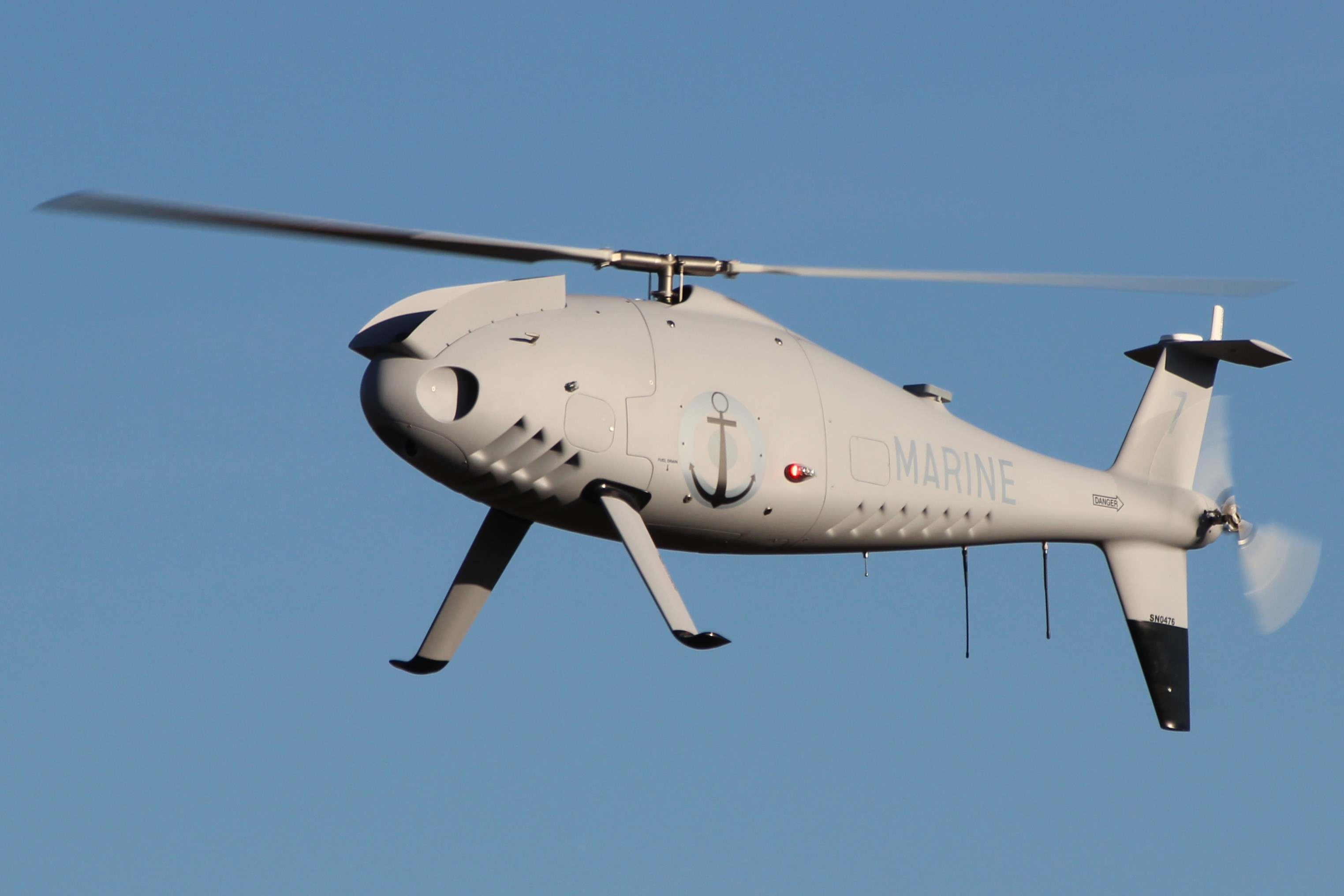
Although most large military UAVs are fixed-wing aircraft, rotorcraft designs (i.e., RUAVs) such as this Schiebel Camcopter S-100 are also used.

Hovering drone in windy weather.

An unmanned aerial vehicle (UAV), or unmanned aircraft system (UAS), commonly known as an aerial drone or simply drone, is an aircraft with no human pilot, crew, or passengers on board, which instead is either autonomous or controlled remotely. UAVs were originally developed through the twentieth century for military missions too "dull, dirty or dangerous" for humans, and by the twenty-first had become essential assets to most militaries. As control technologies improved and costs fell, their use expanded to many non-military applications. These include aerial photography, area coverage, precision agriculture, forest fire monitoring, river monitoring, environmental monitoring, weather observation, policing and surveillance, infrastructure inspections, smuggling, product deliveries, entertainment, and drone racing.

== Terminology ==
Many terms are used for aircraft which fly without any persons on board.

Unmanned aerial vehicle (UAV) is defined as a "powered, aerial vehicle that does not carry a human operator, uses aerodynamic forces to provide vehicle lift, can fly autonomously or be piloted remotely, can be expendable or recoverable, and can carry a lethal or nonlethal payload". UAV is a term that is commonly applied in military use cases. A missile with a warhead is generally not considered a UAV because the vehicle itself is a munition, but certain types of propeller-based missile are often called "kamikaze drones" by the public and media. Also, the relation of UAVs to remote controlled model aircraft is unclear in some jurisdictions. The US FAA now defines any unmanned flying craft as a UAV regardless of mass. Similar terms are remotely piloted aircraft (RPA) and remotely piloted aerial vehicle (RPAV).

UAVs and RPAVs can also be seen as components of unmanned aircraft systems (UASs), which also include ground-based controllers and systems of communications with the aircraft. UAS was adopted by the United States Department of Defense (DoD) and the United States Federal Aviation Administration (FAA) in 2005 according to their Unmanned Aircraft System Roadmap 2005–2030. The International Civil Aviation Organization (ICAO) and the British Civil Aviation Authority adopted this term, also used in the European Union's Single European Sky (SES) Air Traffic Management (ATM) Research (SESAR Joint Undertaking) roadmap for 2020. This term emphasizes the importance of elements other than the aircraft. It includes elements such as ground control stations, data links and other support equipment. Similar terms are unmanned aircraft vehicle system (UAVS) and remotely piloted aircraft system (RPAS). Many similar terms are in use. Under new regulations which came into effect 1 June 2019, RPAS has been adopted by the Canadian government to mean "a set of configurable elements consisting of a remotely piloted aircraft, its control station, the command and control links and any other system elements required during flight operation".

In common usage, drone is often applied to both military and civilian UAVs, while technical and regulatory documents may prefer terms such as UAV, UAS, RPAS, or uncrewed aircraft. The term drone has been used from the early days of aviation, sometimes being applied to remotely flown target aircraft used for practice firing of a battleship's guns, such as the 1920s Fairey Queen biplane floatplane and 1930s de Havilland Queen Bee biplane. Later examples included the Airspeed Queen Wasp and Miles Queen Martinet, before ultimate replacement by the GAF Jindivik. The term remains in common use. The term uncrewed is sometimes used rather than unmanned when referring to UAVs.

Autonomous drones also employ various advanced technologies to carry out their missions without human intervention, such as cloud computing, computer vision, artificial intelligence, machine learning, deep learning, and thermal sensors. For recreational uses, an aerial photography drone has first-person video, autonomous capabilities, or both.

== Classification types ==
UAVs may be classified like any other aircraft, according to design configuration such as weight or engine type, maximum flight altitude, degree of operational autonomy, operational role, etc. According to the United States Department of Defense, UAVs are classified into five categories below:

Group:	Group 1	Group 2	Group 3	Group 4	Group 5
Size	Small	Medium	Large	Larger	Largest
Max takeoff weight	< 20 lb (9.1 kg)	> 20 & < 55 (25 kg)	> 55 & < 1320 (600 kg)	> 1,320 lb (600 kg)	> 1,320 lb (600 kg)
Operating altitude	< 1,200 ft (370 m)	< 3,500 ft (1,100 m)	< 18,000 ft (5,500 m)	< 18,000 ft (5,500 m)	> 18,000 ft (5,500 m)
Speed	< 100 kn (190 km/h)	< 250 kn (460 km/h)	< 250 kn (460 km/h)	Any speed	Any speed

Other classifications of UAVs include:

=== Range and endurance ===
There are usually five categories when UAVs are classified by range and endurance:

Range category	Very close	Close	Short	Medium	Long
Range (km):	< 5	> 5 & < 50	> 50 & < 150	> 150 & < 650	> 650
Endurance (hr):	0.5–0.75	1–6	8–12	12–36 or 48	> 36 or 48

=== Size ===
There are usually four categories when UAVs are classified by size, with at least one of the dimensions (length or wingspan) meet the following respective limits:

Category	Micro/Very small	Mini/Small	Medium	Large
Length/wingspan:	< 50 cm	> 50 cm & < 2 m	5–10 m	> 10 m

=== Weight ===
Based on their weight, drones can be classified into five categories:

Drone categories
Category	Nano	Micro (MAV)	Miniature or Small (SUAV)	Medium	Large
Weight:	< 250 g	≥ 250 g & < 2 kg	≥ 2 kg & < 25 kg	≥ 25 kg & < 150 kg	≥ 150 kg

NATO uses a similar classification shown below:

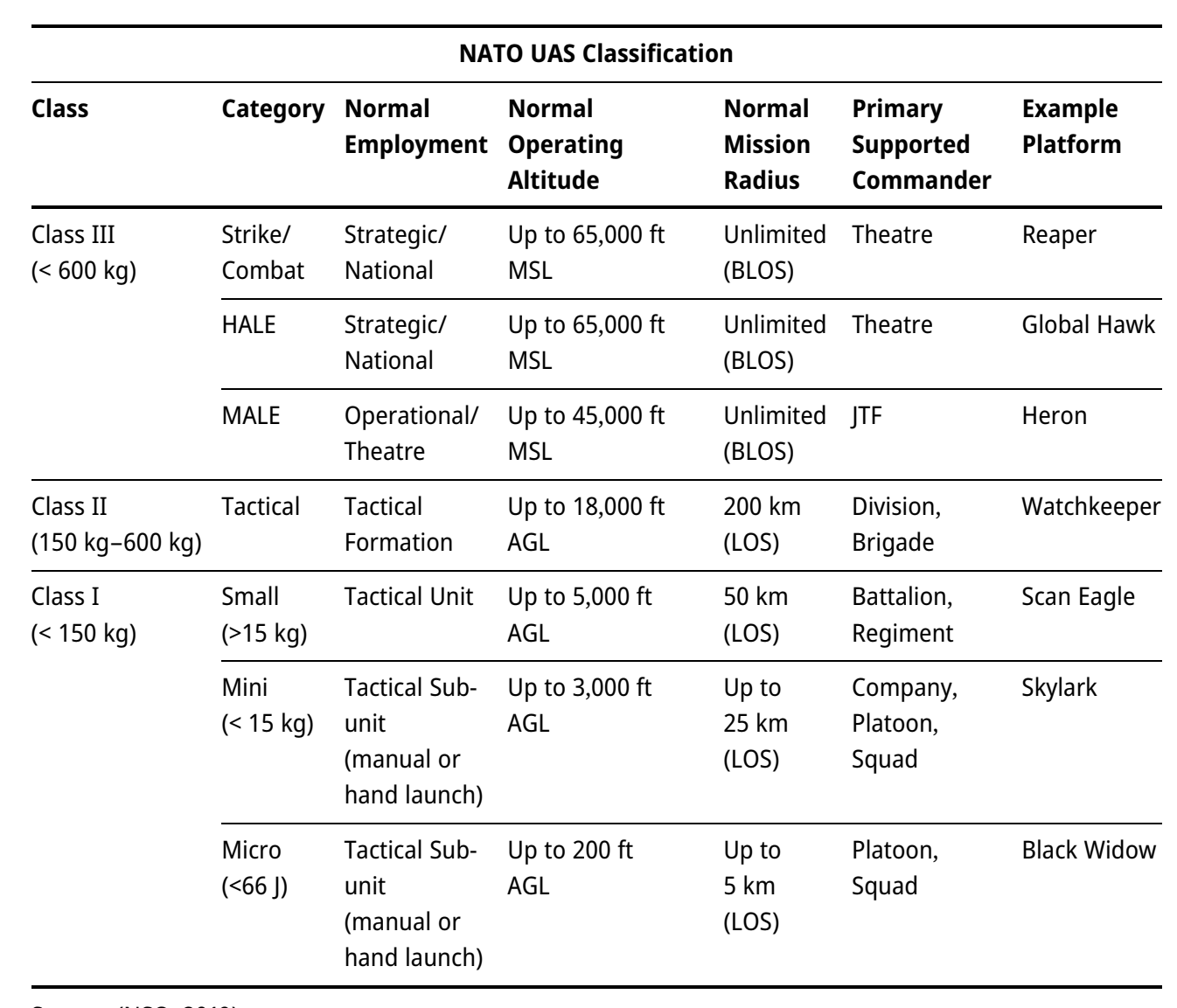
NATO classification of unmanned aerial vehicles

=== Degree of autonomy ===
Drones can also be classified based on degree of autonomy in their flight operations. ICAO classifies unmanned aircraft as either remotely piloted aircraft or fully autonomous. Some UAVs offer intermediate degrees of autonomy. For example, a vehicle may be remotely piloted in most contexts but have an autonomous return-to-base operation. Some aircraft types may optionally fly manned or as UAVs, which may include manned aircraft transformed into manned or optionally piloted UAVs (OPVs). The flight of UAVs may operate under remote control by a human operator, as remotely piloted aircraft (RPA), or with various degrees of autonomy, such as autopilot assistance, up to fully autonomous aircraft that have no provision for human intervention.

=== Altitude ===
Based on the altitude, the following UAV classifications have been used at industry events such as ParcAberporth Unmanned Systems forum:

- Hand-held 2,000 ft (600 m) altitude, about 2 km range
- Close 5,000 ft (1,500 m) altitude, up to 10 km range
- NATO type 10,000 ft (3,000 m) altitude, up to 50 km range
- Tactical 18,000 ft (5,500 m) altitude, about 160 km range
- MALE (medium altitude, long endurance) up to 30,000 ft (9,000 m) and range over 200 km
- HALE (high altitude, long endurance) over 30,000 ft (9,100 m) and indefinite range
- Hypersonic high-speed, supersonic (Mach 1–5) or hypersonic (Mach 5+) 50,000 ft (15,200 m) or suborbital altitude, range over 200 km
- Orbital low Earth orbit (Mach 25+)
- CIS lunar Earth-Moon transfer
- Computer-assisted carrier guidance system (CACGS) for UAVs

=== Composite criteria ===
An example of classification based on the composite criteria is U.S. Military's unmanned aerial systems (UAS) classification of UAVs based on weight, maximum altitude and speed of the UAV component.

=== Lift type ===
==== FFLO ====
Forward flight lift only classified by ICAO with the aircraft type designator FFLO - UAV refers to plane-like drones

==== VFHC ====
Vertical flight/hover capability classified by ICAO with the aircraft type designator VFHC - UAV refers to drones using rotating blades for lift as well as motion

=== Power sources ===
UAVs can be classified based on their power or energy source, which significantly impacts their flight duration, range, and environmental impact. The main categories include:

- Battery-powered (electric): These UAVs use rechargeable batteries, offering quiet operation and lower maintenance but potentially limited flight times. The reduced noise levels make them suitable for urban environments and sensitive operations.
- Fuel-powered (internal combustion): Utilizing traditional fuels like gasoline or diesel, these UAVs often have longer flight times but may be noisier and require more maintenance. They are typically used for applications requiring extended endurance or heavy payload capacity.
- Hybrid: Combining electric and fuel power sources, hybrid UAVs aim to balance the benefits of both systems for improved performance and efficiency. This configuration could allow for versatility in mission profiles and adaptability to different operational requirements.
- Hydrogen fuel cell: hydrogen fuel cells offer the potential for longer flight times than batteries yet stealthier (no heat signature) operation than combustion engines. The high energy density of hydrogen makes it a promising option for future UAV propulsion systems.
- Solar-powered: Equipped with solar panels, these UAVs can potentially achieve extended flight times by harnessing solar energy, especially at high altitudes. Solar-powered UAVs may be particularly suited for long-endurance missions and environmental monitoring applications.
- Nuclear-powered: While nuclear power has been explored for larger aircraft, its application in UAVs remains largely theoretical due to safety concerns and regulatory challenges. Research in this area is ongoing but faces significant hurdles before practical implementation.

== History ==
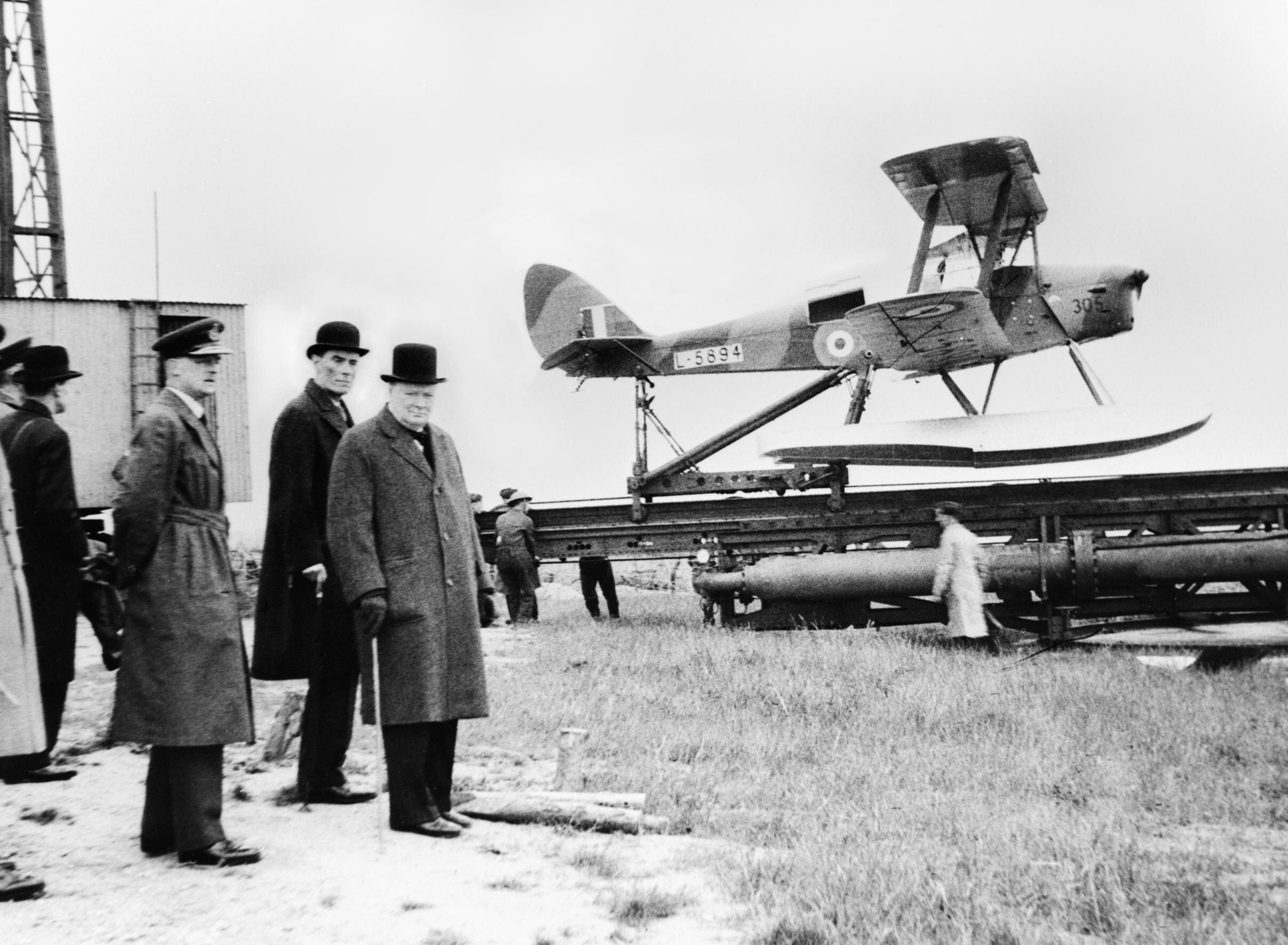
Winston Churchill and others waiting to watch the launch of a de Havilland Queen Bee target drone, 6 June 1941

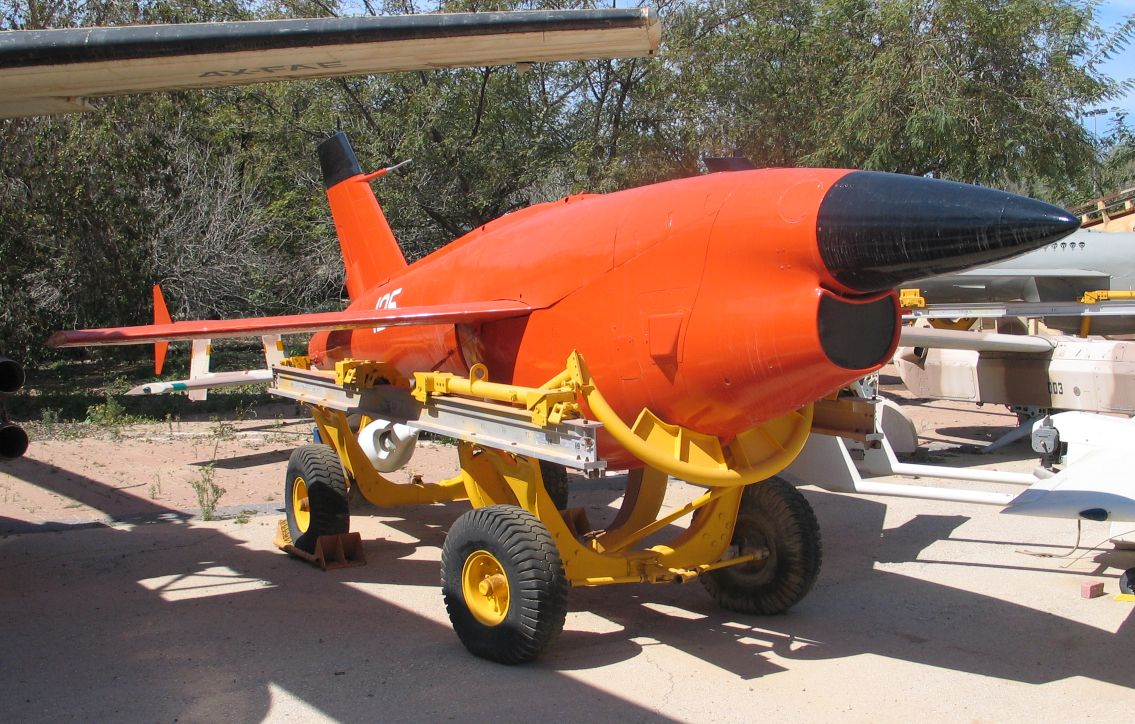
A Ryan Firebee, one of a series of target drones/unpiloted aerial vehicles that first flew in 1951. Israeli Air Force Museum, Hatzerim airbase, Israel, 2006

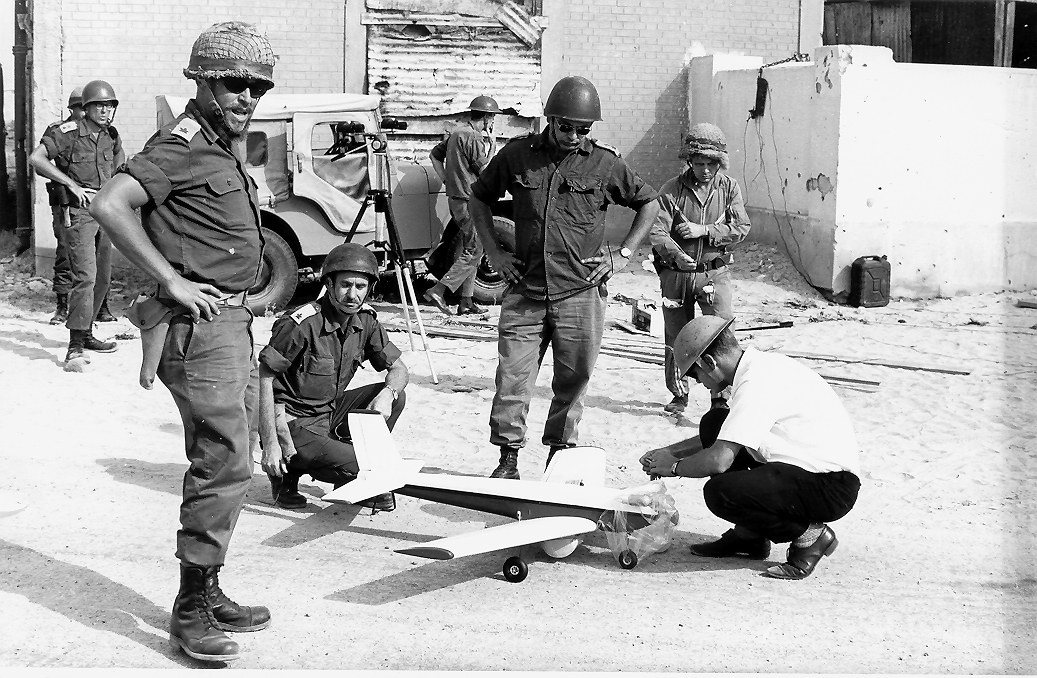
Last preparations before the first tactical UAV mission across the Suez Canal (1969). Standing: Major Shabtai Brill from the Israeli Intelligence Corps, the innovator of the tactical UAV.

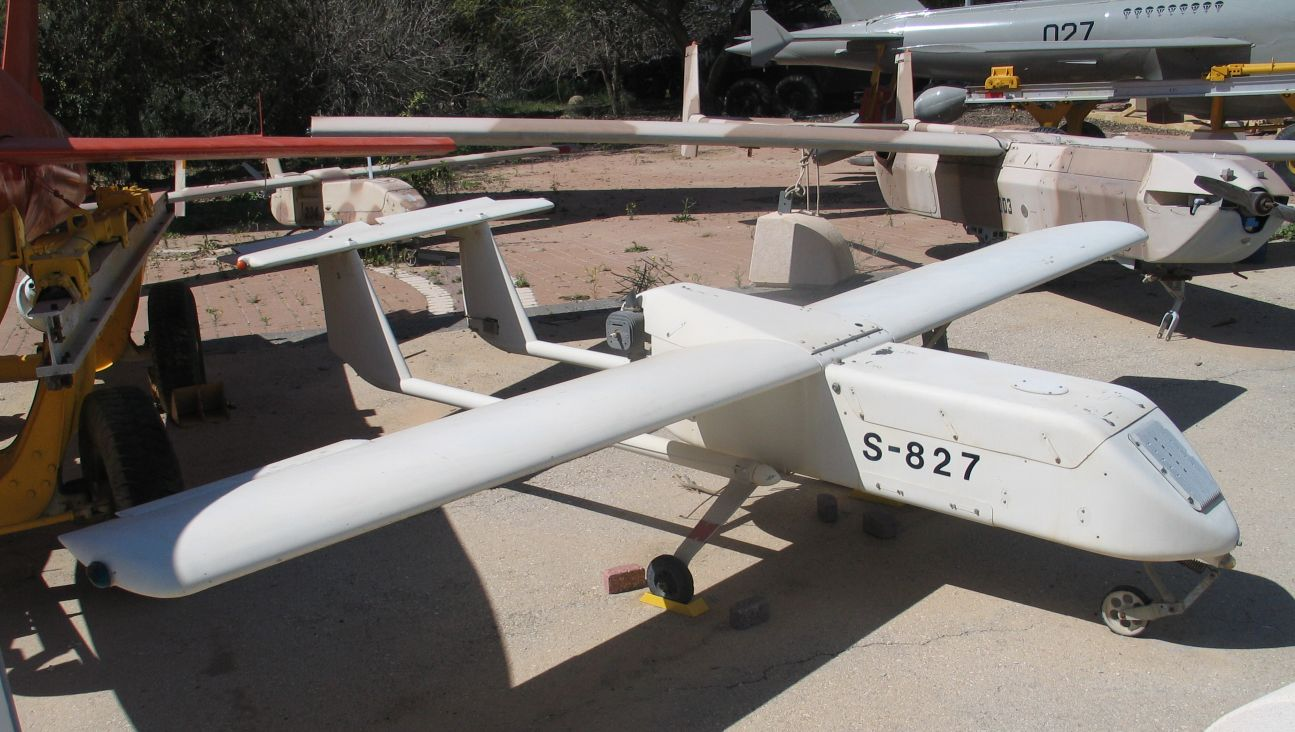
The Israeli Tadiran Mastiff, which first flew in 1975, is seen by many as the first modern battlefield UAV, due to its data-link system, endurance-loitering, and live video-streaming.

=== Early drones ===
The earliest recorded use of an unmanned aerial vehicle for warfighting occurred in July 1849, with a balloon carrier (the precursor to the aircraft carrier) in the first offensive use of air power in naval aviation. Austrian forces besieging Venice attempted to launch some 200 incendiary balloons at the besieged city. The balloons were launched mainly from land; however, some were also launched from the Austrian ship SMS Vulcano. At least one bomb fell in the city; however, due to the wind changing after launch, most of the balloons missed their target, and some drifted back over Austrian lines and the launching ship Vulcano.

The Spanish engineer Leonardo Torres Quevedo introduced a radio-based control-system called the Telekino at the Paris Academy of Science in 1903, as a way of testing airships without risking human life.

Significant development of drones started in the 1900s, and originally focused on providing practice targets for training military personnel. The earliest attempt at a powered UAV was A. M. Low's "Aerial Target" in 1916. Low confirmed that Geoffrey de Havilland's monoplane was the one that flew under control on 21 March 1917 using his radio system. Following this successful demonstration in the spring of 1917 Low was transferred to develop aircraft controlled fast motor launches D.C.B.s with the Royal Navy in 1918 intended to attack shipping and port installations and he also assisted Wing Commander Brock in preparations for the Zeebrugge Raid. Other British unmanned developments followed, leading to the fleet of over 400 de Havilland 82 Queen Bee aerial targets that went into service in 1935.

Nikola Tesla described a fleet of uncrewed aerial combat vehicles in 1915. These developments also inspired the construction of the Kettering Bug by Charles Kettering from Dayton, Ohio and the Hewitt-Sperry Automatic Airplane – initially meant as an uncrewed plane that would carry an explosive payload to a predetermined target. Development continued during World War I, when the Dayton-Wright Airplane Company invented a pilotless aerial torpedo that would explode at a preset time.

The film star and model-airplane enthusiast Reginald Denny developed the first scaled remote piloted vehicle in 1935.

Soviet researchers experimented with controlling Tupolev TB-1 bombers remotely in the late 1930s.

==== World War II ====
In 1940, Reginald Denny started the Radioplane Company and more models emerged during World War II – used both to train antiaircraft gunners and to fly attack-missions. Nazi Germany produced and used various UAV aircraft during the war, like the Argus As 292 and the V-1 flying bomb with a jet engine. Fascist Italy developed a specialised drone version of the Savoia-Marchetti SM.79 flown by remote control, although the Armistice with Italy was enacted prior to any operational deployment.

==== Postwar period ====
After World War II development continued in vehicles such as the American JB-4 (using television/radio-command guidance), the Australian GAF Jindivik and Teledyne Ryan Firebee I of 1951, while companies like Beechcraft offered their Model 1001 for the U.S. Navy in 1955. Nevertheless, they were little more than remote-controlled airplanes until the Vietnam War. In 1959, the U.S. Air Force, concerned about losing pilots over hostile territory, began planning for the use of uncrewed aircraft. Planning intensified after the Soviet Union shot down a U-2 in 1960. Within days, a highly classified UAV program started under the code name of "Red Wagon". The August 1964 clash in the Tonkin Gulf between naval units of the U.S. and the North Vietnamese Navy initiated America's highly classified UAVs (Ryan Model 147, Ryan AQM-91 Firefly, Lockheed D-21) into their first combat missions of the Vietnam War. When the Chinese government showed photographs of downed U.S. UAVs via Wide World Photos, the official U.S. response was "no comment".

During the War of Attrition (1967–1970) in the Middle East, Israeli intelligence tested the first tactical UAVs installed with reconnaissance cameras, which successfully returned photos from across the Suez Canal. This was the first time that tactical UAVs that could be launched and landed on any short runway (unlike the heavier jet-based UAVs) were developed and tested in battle.

In the 1973 Yom Kippur War, Israel used UAVs as decoys to spur opposing forces into wasting expensive anti-aircraft missiles. After the 1973 Yom Kippur War, a few key people from the team that developed this early UAV joined a small startup company that aimed to develop UAVs into a commercial product, eventually purchased by Tadiran and leading to the development of the first Israeli UAV.

In 1973, the U.S. military officially confirmed that they had been using UAVs in Southeast Asia (Vietnam). Over 5,000 U.S. airmen had been killed and over 1,000 more were missing or captured. The USAF 100th Strategic Reconnaissance Wing flew about 3,435 UAV missions during the war at a cost of about 554 UAVs lost to all causes. In the words of USAF General George S. Brown, Commander, Air Force Systems Command, in 1972, "The only reason we need (UAVs) is that we don't want to needlessly expend the man in the cockpit." Later that year, General John C. Meyer, Commander in Chief, Strategic Air Command, stated, "we let the drone do the high-risk flying ... the loss rate is high, but we are willing to risk more of them ...they save lives!"

During the 1973 Yom Kippur War, Soviet-supplied surface-to-air missile-batteries in Egypt and Syria caused heavy damage to Israeli fighter jets. As a result, Israel developed the IAI Scout as the first UAV with real-time surveillance. The images and radar decoys provided by these UAVs helped Israel to completely neutralize the Syrian air defenses at the start of the 1982 Lebanon War, resulting in no pilots downed. In Israel in 1987, UAVs were first used as proof-of-concept of super-agility, post-stall controlled flight in combat-flight simulations that involved tailless, stealth-technology-based, three-dimensional thrust vectoring flight-control, and jet-steering.

==== Post-Cold War UAVs ====
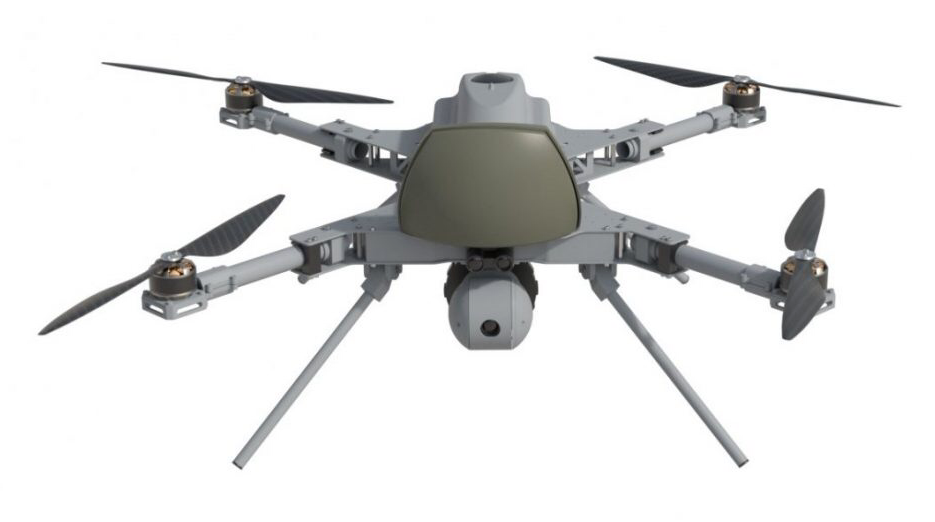
The Turkish STM Kargu was the first lethal autonomous weapon to attack enemy combatants in warfare.

With the maturing and miniaturization of applicable technologies in the 1980s and 1990s, interest in UAVs grew within the higher echelons of the U.S. military. The U.S. funded the Counterterrorism Center (CTC) within the CIA, which sought to fight terrorism with the aid of modernized drone technology. In the 1990s, the U.S. DoD gave a contract to AAI Corporation along with Israeli company Malat. The U.S. Navy bought the AAI Pioneer UAV that AAI and Malat developed jointly. Many of these UAVs saw service in the 1991 Gulf War. UAVs demonstrated the possibility of cheaper, more capable fighting-machines, deployable without risk to aircrews. Initial generations primarily involved surveillance aircraft, but some carried armaments, such as the General Atomics MQ-1 Predator, that launched AGM-114 Hellfire air-to-ground missiles.

=== 2000s ===
CAPECON, a European Union project to develop UAVs, ran from 1 May 2002 to 31 December 2005.

As of 2012, the United States Air Force (USAF) employed 7,494 UAVs – almost one in three USAF aircraft. The Central Intelligence Agency also operated UAVs. By 2013 at least 50 countries used UAVs. China, Iran, Israel, Pakistan, Turkey, and others designed and built their own varieties. The use of drones has continued to increase. Due to their wide proliferation, no comprehensive list of UAV systems exists.

In 2006, the United States Federal Aviation Administration (FAA) allowed the usage of unmanned aerial vehicles inside civilian airspace with specific regulations, laying out legal groundwork for consumer drone usage inside the United States.

In 2013, DJI released the first model of the Phantom drone, DJI's fully assembled drone model. Priced at $629, Phantom was an entry-level drone, featuring much more user-friendly experiences than other drones on the market at the time. The DJI Phantom was considered one of the most influential consumer drone products ever made. With its affordability, accessibility, and user-friendly software, it quickly captured the consumer drone market from hobbyists, professionals, and introduced the modern aerial photography drone form factor to the general public. By 2017, DJI alone had over 75% of the global consumer drone market share.

In 2020, a Kargu 2 drone hunted down and attacked a human target in Libya, according to a report from the UN Security Council's Panel of Experts on Libya, published in March 2021. This may have been the first time an autonomous weapons system capable of lethal engagement attacked human beings.

Drone technology, including systems such as the Turkish Bayraktar TB2, has been identified as a contributing factor in Azerbaijan's military performance in the 2020 Nagorno-Karabakh war against Armenia.

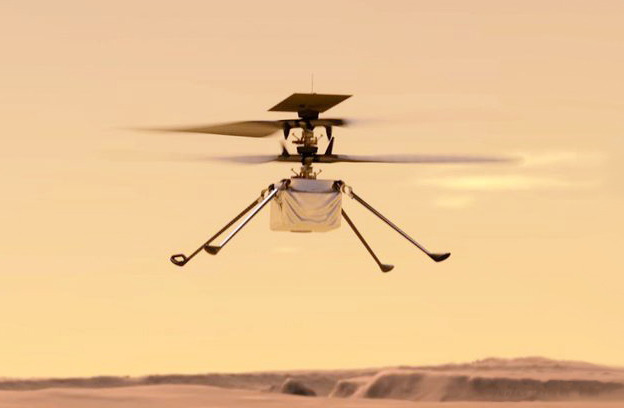
Artist's concept of Ingenuity landing on Mars

NASA has sent drones to distant planets. The Ingenuity helicopter is an autonomous UAV that operated on Mars from 2021 to 2024. As of 2024 the Dragonfly spacecraft is being developed and is aiming to reach and examine Saturn's moon Titan. Its primary goal is to roam around the surface, expanding the amount of area to be researched previously seen by landers. As a UAV, Dragonfly allows examination of potentially diverse types of soil. The drone is set to launch in 2027, and is estimated to take seven more years to reach the Saturnian system.

Miniaturization is also supporting the development of small UAVs, which can be used as an individual system or in a fleet, enabling efficient surveying of large areas in a relatively small amount of time.

The April 2024 Iranian strikes against Israel took place on 13 April 2024 when the Iranian Revolutionary Guard and other groups of the Axis of Resistance launched about 300 drones at Israel, a distance of about 1,500 kilometres.

According to data from GlobalData, the global military uncrewed aerial systems (UAS) market, which forms a significant part of the UAV industry, is projected to experience a compound annual growth rate of 4.8% over the next decade. This represents a near doubling in market size, from $12.5 billion in 2024 to an estimated $20 billion by 2034.

==== Russo-Ukrainian war ====
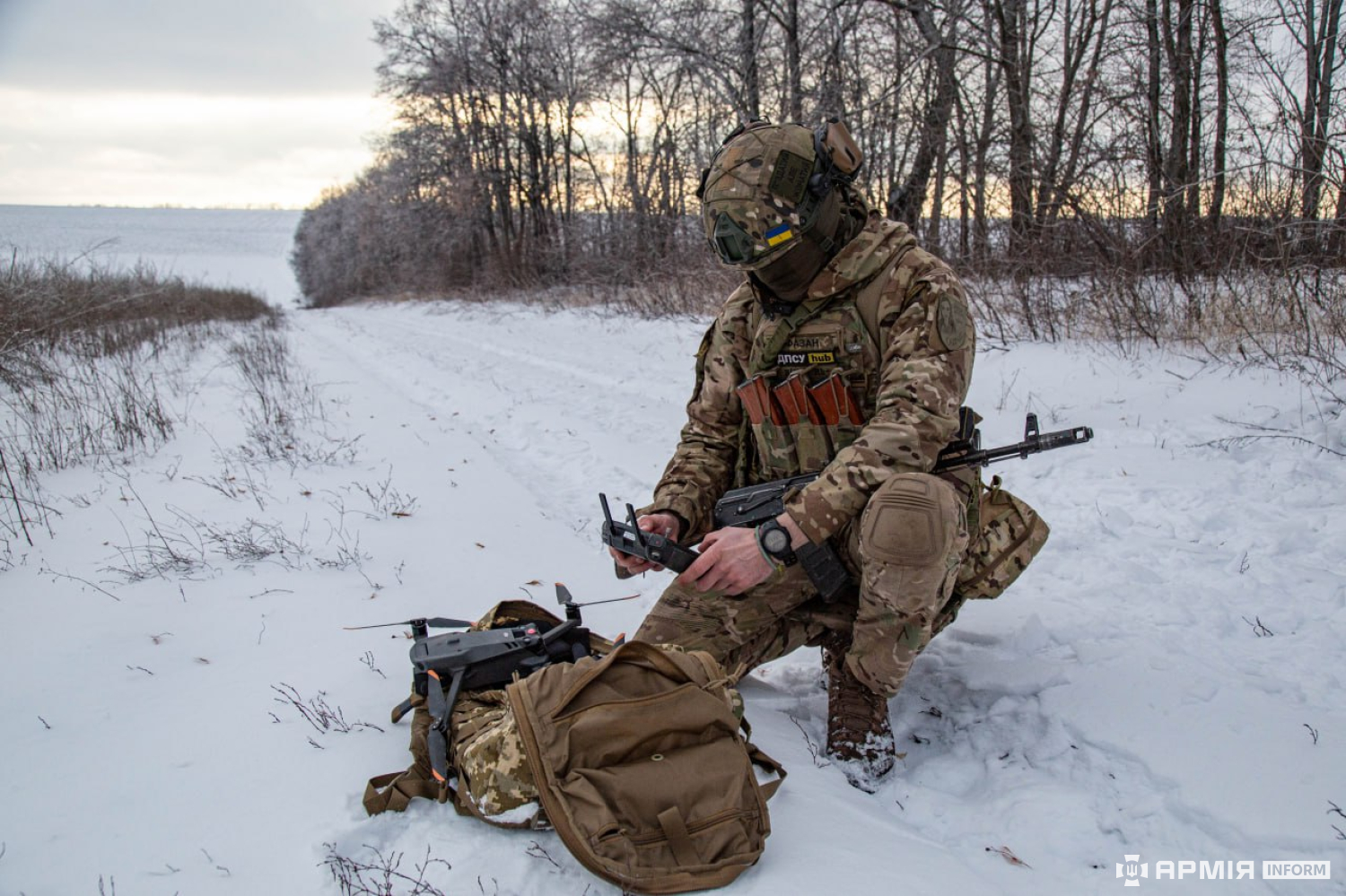
Ukrainian drone operator controlling a DJI Mavic drone

The Russian invasion of Ukraine in 2022 was widely described as the first full-scale war featuring the large-scale use of commercial and consumer-grade UAVs in military settings, particularly quadcopters and first-person view (FPV) drones, modified with sensors and explosives for various missions and tactical usage. The consumer and small UAVs have significantly influenced modern warfare, particularly due to their accessibility and cost and contributed to the development of new offensive and defensive strategies.

Both Ukraine and Russia used small consumer drones extensively during the war, which served as a tactical surveillance, strike, and propaganda tools. Consumer drones were sourced by governments, hobbyists, international donations to Ukraine and Russia to support each side on the battlefield, and were often flown by drone hobbyists recruited by the armed forces. Consumer drones' affordability, technical capabilities, and reliability contributed to their widespread adoption. They were also preferred for their commercial availability. Companies attempted to restrict military usage of consumer product, but effect was limited, as donors and buyers could ship the drones across the border via intermediates and modified their software to circumnavigate the restrictions. In Ukraine, small commercial UAVs and FPV drones had become an ubiquitous and critical part of the war.

== Design ==
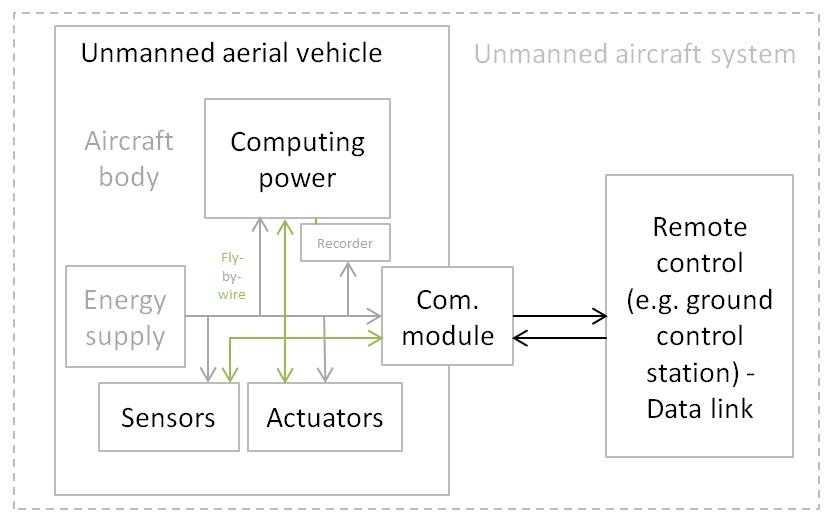
General physical structure of a UAV

Crewed and uncrewed aircraft of the same type generally have recognizably similar physical components. The main exceptions are the cockpit and environmental control system or life-support systems. Some UAVs carry payloads (such as a camera) that weigh considerably less than an adult human, and as a result, can be considerably smaller. Though they carry heavy payloads, weaponized military UAVs are lighter than their crewed counterparts with comparable armaments.

Small civilian UAVs have no life-critical systems, and can thus be built out of lighter but less sturdy materials and shapes, and can use less robustly tested electronic control systems. For small UAVs, the quadcopter design has become popular, though this layout is rarely used for crewed aircraft. Miniaturization means that less-powerful propulsion technologies can be used that are not feasible for crewed aircraft, such as small electric motors and batteries.

Control systems for UAVs are often different from crewed craft. For remote human control, a camera and video link almost always replace the cockpit windows; radio-transmitted digital commands replace physical cockpit controls. Autopilot software is used on both crewed and uncrewed aircraft, with varying feature sets.

=== Aircraft configuration ===
UAVs can be designed in different configurations than manned aircraft, both because there is no need for a cockpit and its windows, and there is no need to optimize for human comfort, although some UAVs are adapted from piloted examples, or are designed for optionally piloted modes. Air safety is also less of a critical requirement for unmanned aircraft, allowing the designer greater freedom to experiment. Instead, UAVs are typically designed around their onboard payloads and their ground equipment. These factors have led to a great variety of airframe and motor configurations in UAVs.

For conventional flight, the flying wing and blended wing body offer light weight combined with low drag and stealth, and are popular configurations for many use cases. Larger types which carry a variable payload are more likely to feature a distinct fuselage with a tail for stability, control and trim, although the wing configurations in use vary widely.

For uses that require vertical flight or hovering, the tailless quadcopter requires a relatively simple control system and is common for smaller UAVs. Multirotor designs with 6 or more rotors is more common with larger UAVs, where redundancy is prioritized.

=== Propulsion ===
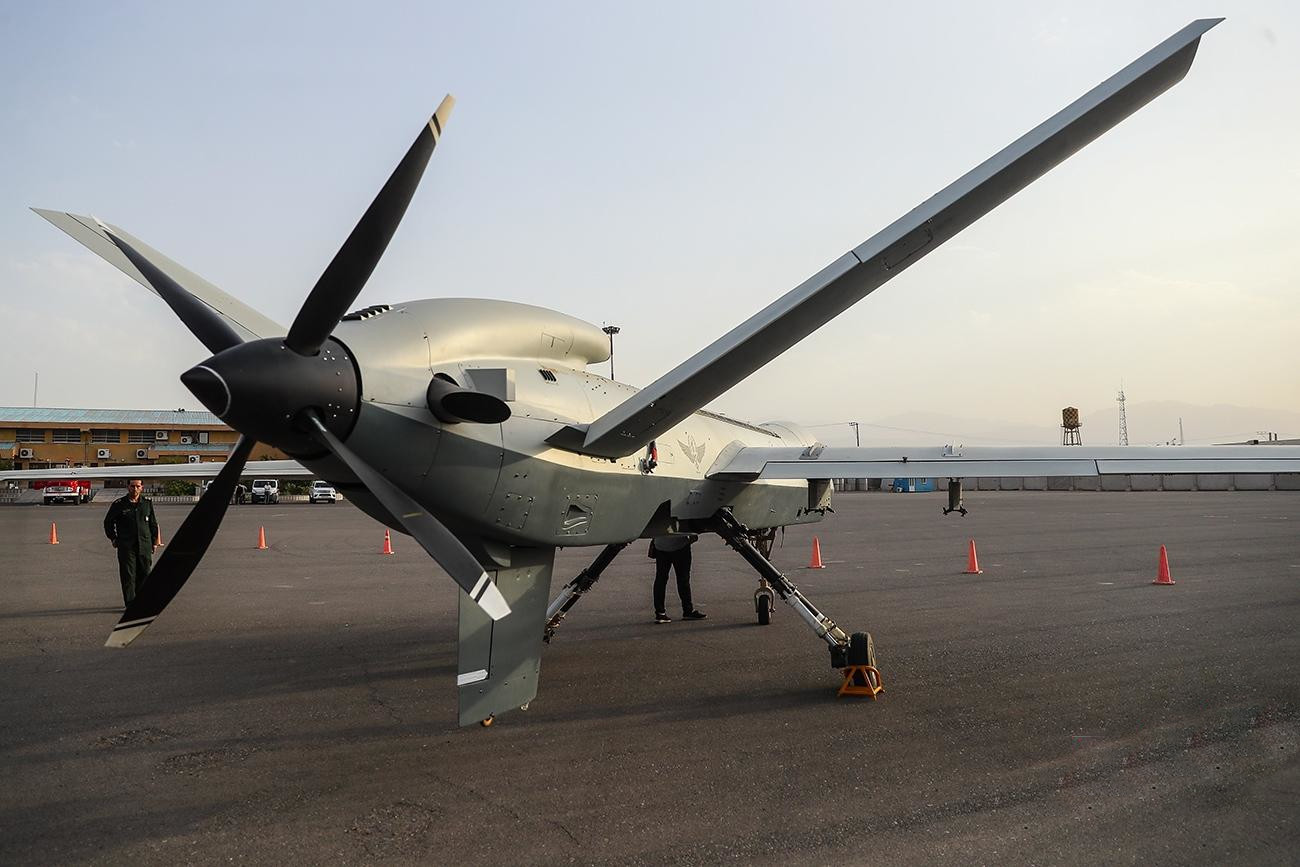
Rear view of the Iranian Shahed 149 Gaza UCAV

Traditional internal combustion and jet engines remain in use for drones requiring long range. However, for shorter-range missions electric power has almost entirely taken over. The distance record for a UAV (built from balsa wood and mylar skin) across the North Atlantic Ocean is held by a gasoline model airplane or UAV. Manard Hill "in 2003 when one of his creations flew 1,882 miles across the Atlantic Ocean on less than a gallon of fuel" holds this record.

Besides the traditional piston engine, the Wankel rotary engine is used by some drones. This type offers high power output for lower weight, with quieter and more vibration-free running. Claims have also been made for improved reliability and greater range.

Small drones mostly use lithium-polymer batteries (Li-Po), while some larger vehicles have adopted the hydrogen fuel cell. Hydrogen-fueled proton-exchange membrane fuel cells for UAVs have the advantages of longer flight duration than rechargeable lithium-ion batteries, of lower total cost of ownership than primary lithium metal batteries and of better stealth than heat engines.

The energy density of modern Li-Po batteries is far less than gasoline or hydrogen. However, electric motors are cheaper, lighter and quieter. Complex multi-engine, multi-propeller installations are under development with the goal of improving aerodynamic and propulsive efficiency. For such complex power installations, battery elimination circuitry (BEC) may be used to centralize power distribution and minimize heating, under the control of a microcontroller unit (MCU).

=== Ornithopters – wing propulsion ===
Flapping-wing ornithopters, imitating birds or insects, have been flown as microUAVs. Their inherent stealth recommends them for spy missions.

Sub-1g microUAVs inspired by flies, albeit using a power tether, have been able to "land" on vertical surfaces. Other projects mimic the flight of beetles and other insects.

== Computer control systems ==
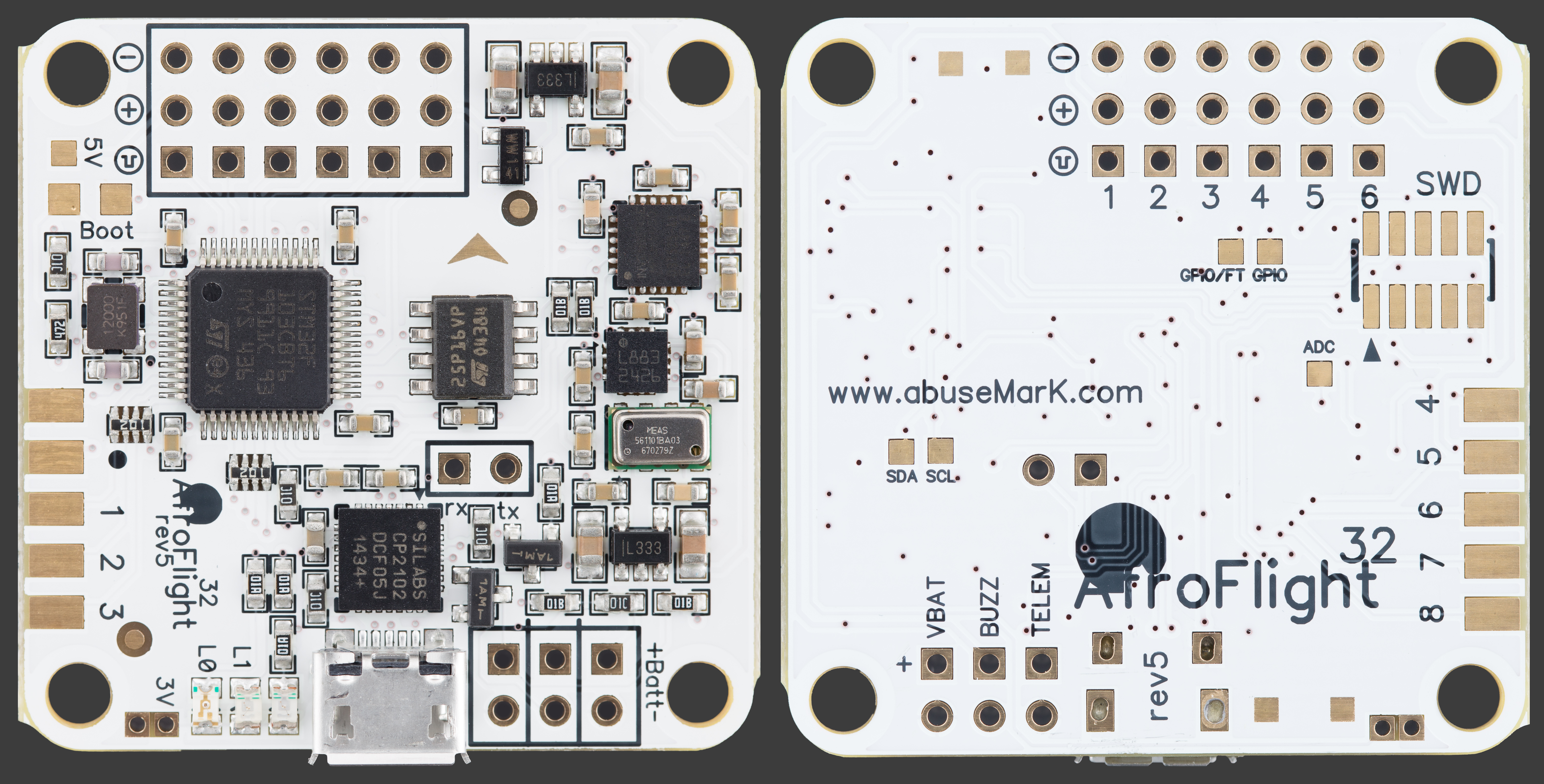
A flight controller run on either CleanFlight or BaseFlight firmware for multirotor UAVs

UAV computing capability followed the advances of computing technology, beginning with analog controls and evolving into microcontrollers, then system-on-a-chip (SOC) and single-board computers (SBC).

Modern system hardware for UAV control is often called the flight controller (FC), flight controller board (FCB) or autopilot. Common UAV-systems control hardware typically incorporate a primary microprocessor, a secondary or failsafe processor, and sensors such as accelerometers, gyroscopes, magnetometers, and barometers into a single module.

In 2024 EASA agreed on the first certification basis for a UAV flight controller in compliance with the ETSO-C198 for Embention's autopilot. The certification of the UAV flight control systems aims to facilitate the integration of UAVs within the airspace and the operation of drones in critical areas.

=== Architecture ===
==== Sensors ====
Position and movement sensors give information about the aircraft state. Exteroceptive sensors deal with external information like distance measurements, while exproprioceptive ones correlate internal and external states.

Non-cooperative sensors are able to detect targets autonomously so they are used for separation assurance and collision avoidance.

Degrees of freedom (DOF) refers to both the amount and quality of onboard sensors: 6 DOF implies 3-axis gyroscopes and accelerometers (a typical inertial measurement unit – IMU), 9 DOF refers to an IMU plus a compass, 10 DOF adds a barometer and 11 DOF usually adds a GPS receiver.

In addition to the navigation sensors, the UAV (or UAS) can be also equipped with monitoring devices such as: RGB, multispectral, hyper-spectral cameras or LiDAR, which may allow providing specific measurements or observations.

==== Actuators ====
UAV actuators include digital electronic speed controllers (which control the RPM of the motors) linked to motors/engines and propellers, servomotors (for planes and helicopters mostly), weapons, payload actuators, LEDs and speakers.

==== Software ====
Modern UAVs run a software stack that ranges from low-level firmware that directly controls actuators, to high level flight planning. At the lowest level, firmware directly controls reading from sensors such as an IMU and commanding actuators such as motors. Control software (often referred to as an autopilot) is responsible for computing actuator speeds given desired vehicle velocity. Due to its direct interaction with hardware, this software is time-critical and may run on microcontrollers. This software may also handle radio communications, in the case of UAVs that are not autonomous. One popular example is the PX4 autopilot.

At the next level, autonomy algorithms compute the desired velocity given higher level goals. For example, trajectory optimization may be used to calculate a flight trajectory given a desired goal location. This software is not necessarily time-critical, and can often run on a single board computer running an operating system such as Linux with relaxed time constraints.

Deep reinforcement learning has also been investigated for UAV flight control, particularly for navigating continuous three-dimensional environments and improving autonomous decision-making. Similarly, AI-driven automation is increasingly being applied to counter-UAS (C-UAS) systems to reduce operator cognitive load by automatically linking electronic drone detection data with physical tracking cameras for "hands-free" target tracking.

==== Loop principles ====
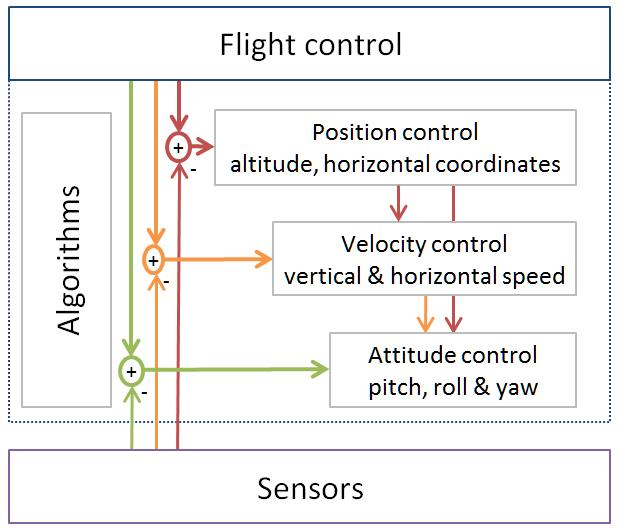
Typical flight-control loops for a multirotor

UAVs employ open-loop, closed-loop or hybrid control architectures.

- Open loop – This type provides a positive control signal (faster, slower, left, right, up, down) without incorporating feedback from sensor data.
- Closed loop – This type incorporates sensor feedback to adjust behavior (reduce speed to reflect tailwind, move to altitude 300 feet). The PID controller is common. Sometimes, feedforward is employed, transferring the need to close the loop further.

==== Communications ====
UAVs use a radio for control and exchange of video and other data. Early UAVs had only narrowband uplink. Downlinks came later. These bi-directional narrowband radio links carried command and control (C&C) and telemetry data about the status of aircraft systems to the remote operator.

In most modern UAV applications, video transmission is required. So instead of having separate links for C&C, telemetry and video traffic, a broadband link is used to carry all types of data. These broadband links can leverage quality of service techniques and carry TCP/IP traffic that can be routed over the internet.

The radio signal from the operator side can be issued from either:

- Ground control – a human operating a radio transmitter/receiver, a smartphone, a tablet, a computer, or the original meaning of a military ground control station (GCS).
- Remote network system, such as satellite duplex data links for some military powers. Downstream digital video over mobile networks has also entered consumer markets, while direct UAV control uplink over the cellular mesh and LTE have been demonstrated and are in trials.
- Another aircraft, serving as a relay or mobile control station – military manned-unmanned teaming (MUM-T).

Modern networking standards have explicitly considered drones and therefore include optimizations. The 5G standard has mandated reduced user plane latency to 1ms while using ultra-reliable and low-latency communications.

UAV-to-UAV coordination supported by Remote ID communication technology. Remote ID messages (containing the UAV coordinates) are broadcast and can be used for collision-free navigation.

=== Autonomy ===
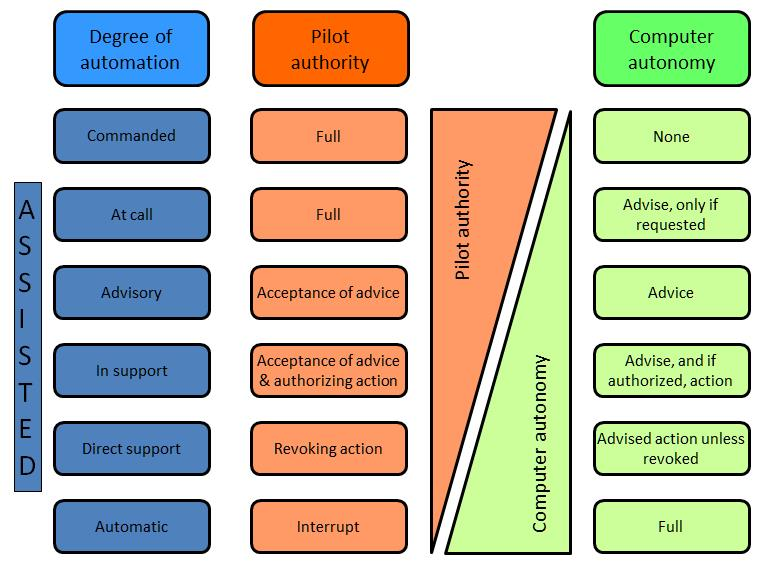
UAV's degrees of autonomy

The level of autonomy in UAVs varies widely. UAV manufacturers often build in specific autonomous operations, such as:

- Self-level: attitude stabilization on the pitch and roll axes.
- Altitude hold: The aircraft maintains its altitude using barometric pressure and/or GPS data.
- Hover/position hold: Keep level pitch and roll, stable yaw heading and altitude while maintaining position using GNSS or inertial sensors.
- Headless mode: Pitch control relative to the position of the pilot rather than relative to the vehicle's axes.
- Care-free: automatic roll and yaw control while moving horizontally
- Takeoff and landing (using a variety of aircraft or ground-based sensors and systems; see also "autoland")
- Failsafe: automatic landing or return-to-home upon loss of control signal
- Return-to-home: Fly back to the point of takeoff (often gaining altitude first to avoid possible intervening obstructions such as trees or buildings).
- Follow-me: Maintain relative position to a moving pilot or other object using GNSS, image recognition or homing beacon.
- GPS waypoint navigation: Using GNSS to navigate to an intermediate location on a travel path.
- Orbit around an object: Similar to follow-me but continuously circle a target.
- Pre-programmed aerobatics (such as rolls and loops)
- Pre-programmed delivery (delivery drones)

One approach to quantifying autonomous capabilities is based on OODA terminology, as suggested by a 2002 US Air Force Research Laboratory report, and used in the table on the right.

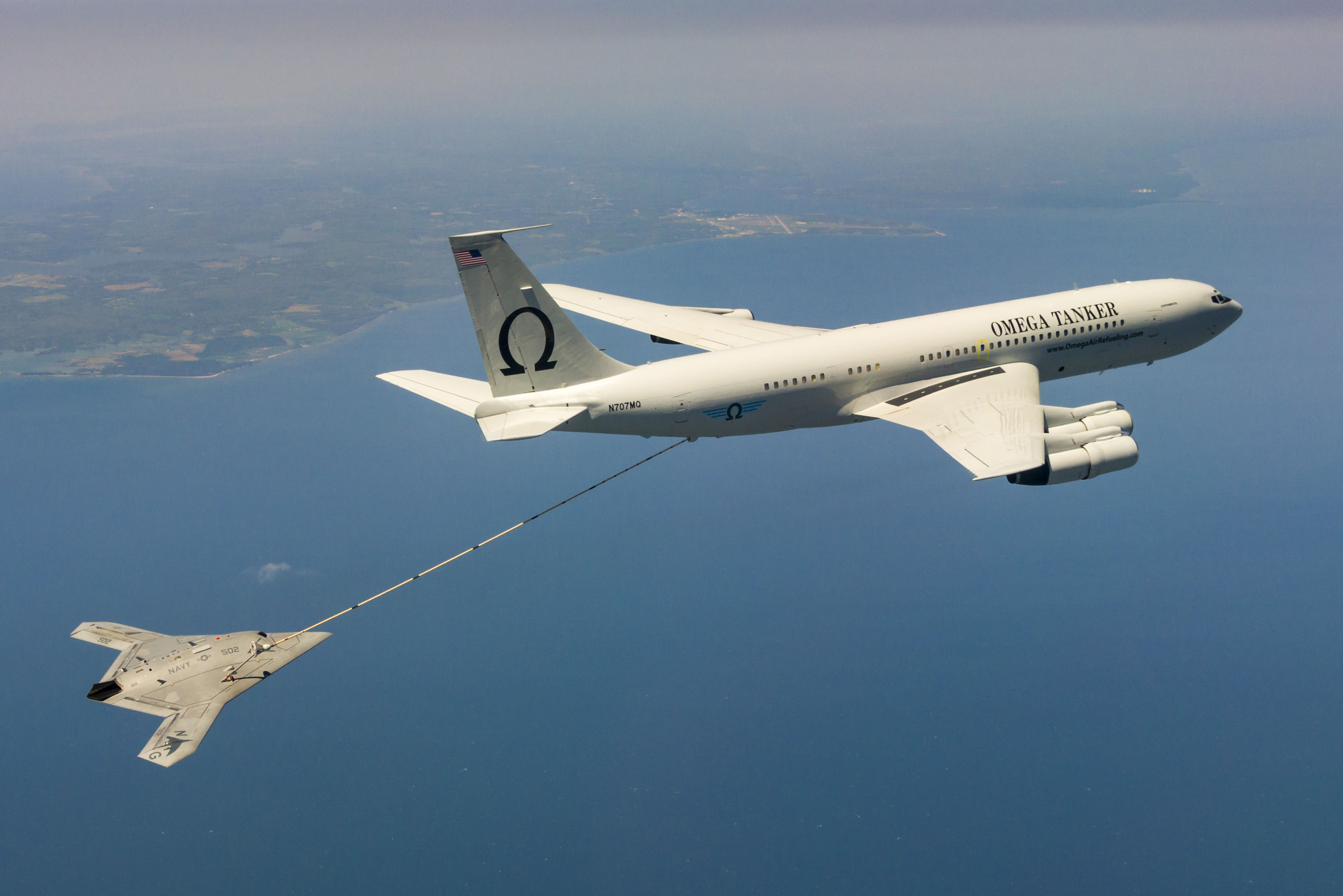
A Northrop Grumman X-47B unmanned combat aircraft demonstrator of the US Navy refuels in flight from a tanker aircraft.

Full autonomy is available for specific tasks, such as airborne refueling or ground-based battery switching.

Other functions available or under development include; collective flight, real-time collision avoidance, wall following, corridor centring, simultaneous localization and mapping and swarming, cognitive radio, and machine learning. In this context, computer vision can play an important role for automatically ensuring flight safety.

== Performance considerations ==
=== Flight envelope ===
UAVs can be programmed to perform aggressive maneuvers or landing/perching on inclined surfaces, and then to climb toward better communication spots. Some UAVs can control flight with varying flight modelisation, such as VTOL designs.

UAVs can also implement perching on a flat vertical surface.

=== Endurance ===
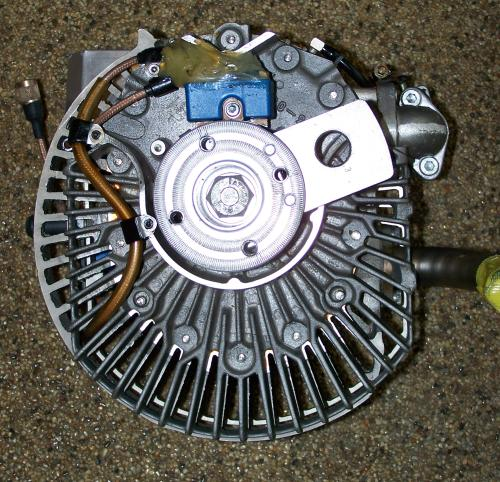
UEL UAV-741 Wankel engine for UAV operations, used on AAI RQ-7 Shadow

Flight time against mass of small (less than 1 kg) drones

UAV endurance is not constrained by the physiological capabilities of a human pilot.

Because of their small size, low weight, low vibration and high power-to-weight ratio, Wankel rotary engines are used in many large UAVs. Their engine rotors cannot seize; the engine is not susceptible to shock-cooling during descent and it does not require an enriched fuel mixture for cooling at high power. These attributes reduce fuel usage, increasing range or payload.

Proper drone cooling is essential for long-term drone endurance. Overheating and subsequent engine failure is the most common cause of drone failure.

Hydrogen fuel cells, using hydrogen power, may be able to extend the endurance of small UAVs, up to several hours.

Micro air vehicles endurance is so far best achieved with flapping-wing UAVs, followed by planes and multirotors standing last, due to lower Reynolds number.

Solar-electric UAVs, a concept originally championed by the AstroFlight Sunrise in 1974, have achieved flight times of several weeks.

Solar-powered atmospheric satellites ("atmosats") designed for operating at altitudes exceeding 20 km (12 miles, or 60,000 feet) for as long as five years could potentially perform duties more economically and with more versatility than low Earth orbit satellites. Likely applications include weather drones for weather monitoring, disaster recovery, Earth imaging and communications.

Electric UAVs powered by microwave power transmission or laser power beaming are other potential endurance solutions.

Another application for a high endurance UAV would be to "stare" at a battlefield for a long interval (ARGUS-IS, Gorgon Stare, Integrated Sensor Is Structure) to record events that could then be played backwards to track battlefield activities.

Lengthy endurance flights
UAV	Flight time hours:minutes	Date	Notes
Boeing Condor	58:11	1989	The aircraft is currently in the Hiller Aviation Museum.
General Atomics Gnat	40:00	1992	
TAM-5	38:52	11 August 2003	Smallest UAV to cross the Atlantic
QinetiQ Zephyr Solar Electric	54:00	September 2007	
RQ-4 Global Hawk	33:06	22 March 2008	Set an endurance record for a full-scale, operational uncrewed aircraft.
QinetiQ Zephyr Solar Electric	82:37	28–31 July 2008	
QinetiQ Zephyr 7	336:22	9–23 July 2010	Solar electric powered. Remained aloft for 14 days. Also filed for FAI altitude record of 70,740 ft (21,561 m)

The delicacy of the British PHASA-35 military drone (at a late stage of development) is such that traversing the first turbulent twelve miles of atmosphere is a hazardous endeavor. It has, however, remained on station at 65,000 feet for 24 hours. Airbus' Zephyr in 2023 has attained 70,000 feet and flown for 64 days; 200 days aimed at. This is sufficiently close enough to near-space for them to be regarded in "pseudo-satellites" as regards to their operational capabilities.

=== Reliability ===
Reliability improvements target all aspects of UAV systems, using resilience engineering and fault tolerance techniques.

Individual reliability covers robustness of flight controllers, to ensure safety without excessive redundancy to minimize cost and weight. Besides, dynamic assessment of flight envelope allows damage-resilient UAVs, using non-linear analysis with ad hoc designed loops or neural networks. UAV software liability is bending toward the design and certifications of crewed avionics software.

Swarm resilience involves maintaining operational capabilities and reconfiguring tasks given unit failures.

== Applications ==
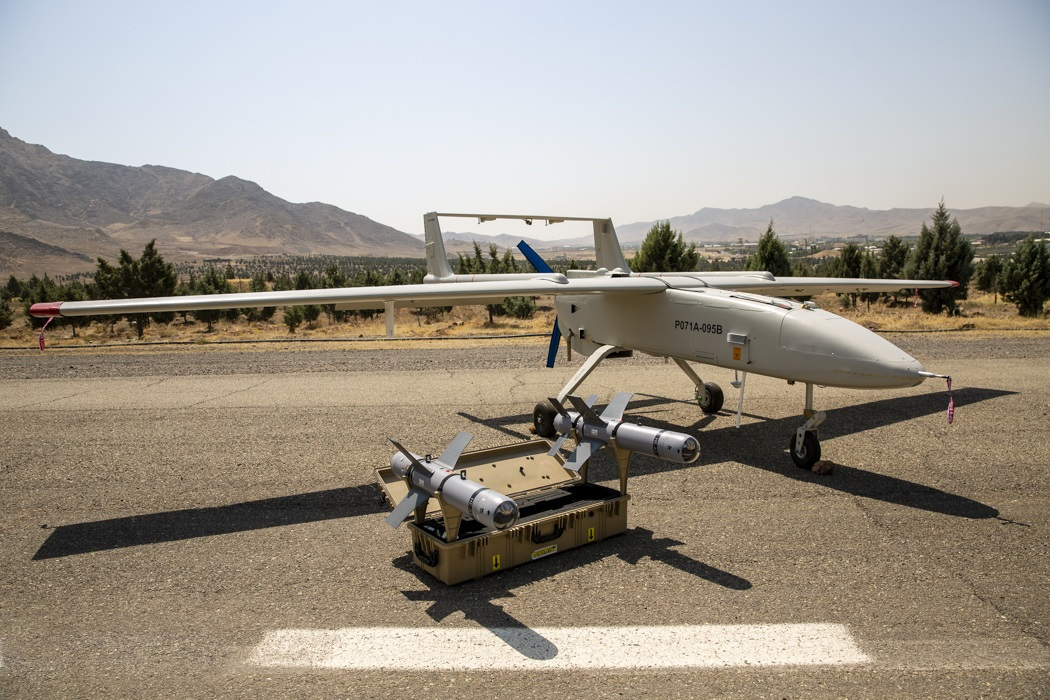
An Iranian Qods Mohajer-6 UCAV of the Islamic Revolutionary Guard Corps Ground Forces equipped with two Qaem precision-guided munition

In recent years, autonomous drones have begun to transform various application areas as they can fly beyond visual line of sight (BVLOS) while maximizing production, reducing costs and risks, ensuring site safety, security and regulatory compliance, and protecting the human workforce in times of a pandemic. They can also be used for consumer-related missions like package delivery, as demonstrated by Amazon Prime Air, and critical deliveries of health supplies.

There are numerous civilian, commercial, military, and aerospace applications for UAVs. These include:

General
Recreation, disaster relief, road traffic monitoring and maritime transportation, archeology, conservation of biodiversity and habitat, law enforcement, crime, and terrorism.
Commercial
Aerial surveillance, filmmaking, journalism, scientific research, surveying, cargo transport, mining, manufacturing, forestry, solar farming, thermal energy, ports and agriculture.

=== Warfare ===
In the Russo-Ukrainian war, use of Russian UAVs increased about tenfold from early 2024 through summer 2025.

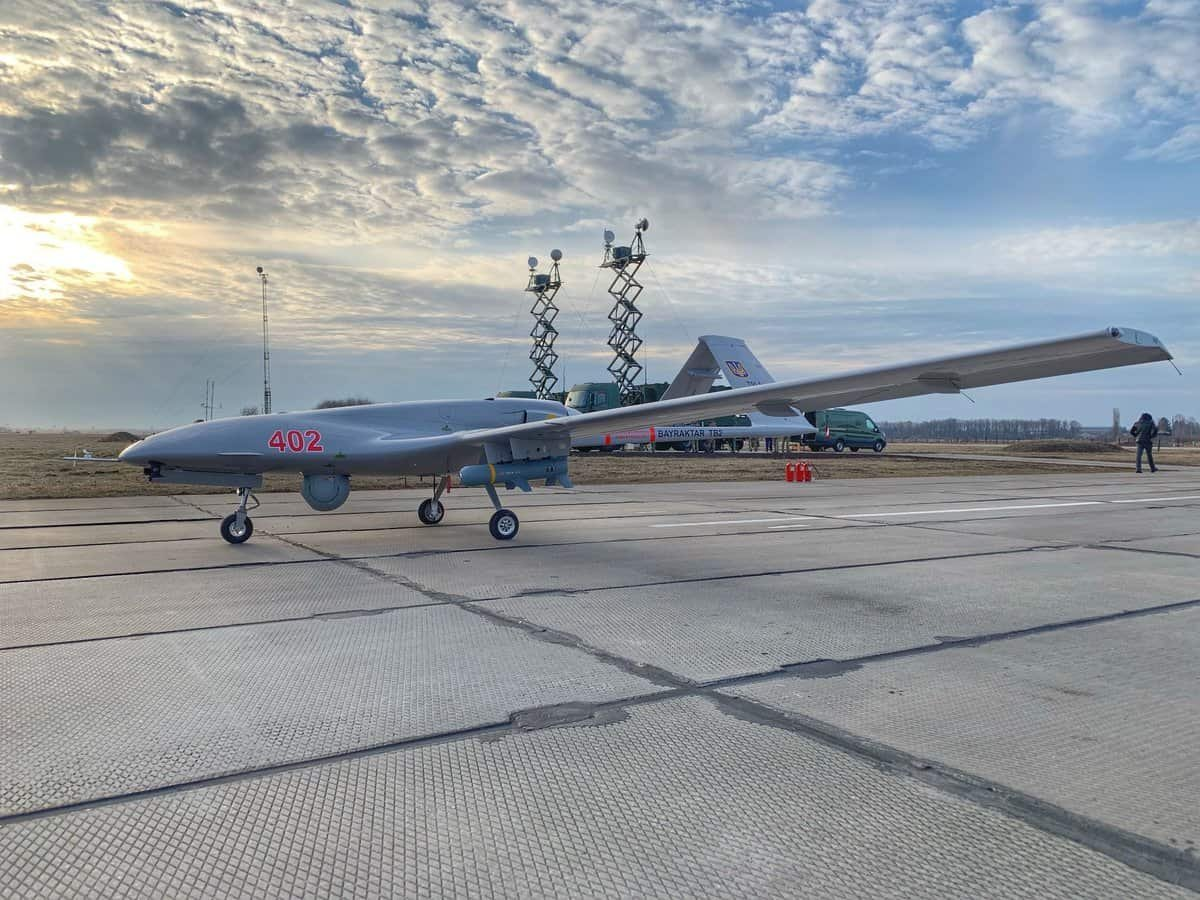
A Baykar Bayraktar TB2 of the Ukrainian Air Force armed with MAM-L; two ground control stations in the background

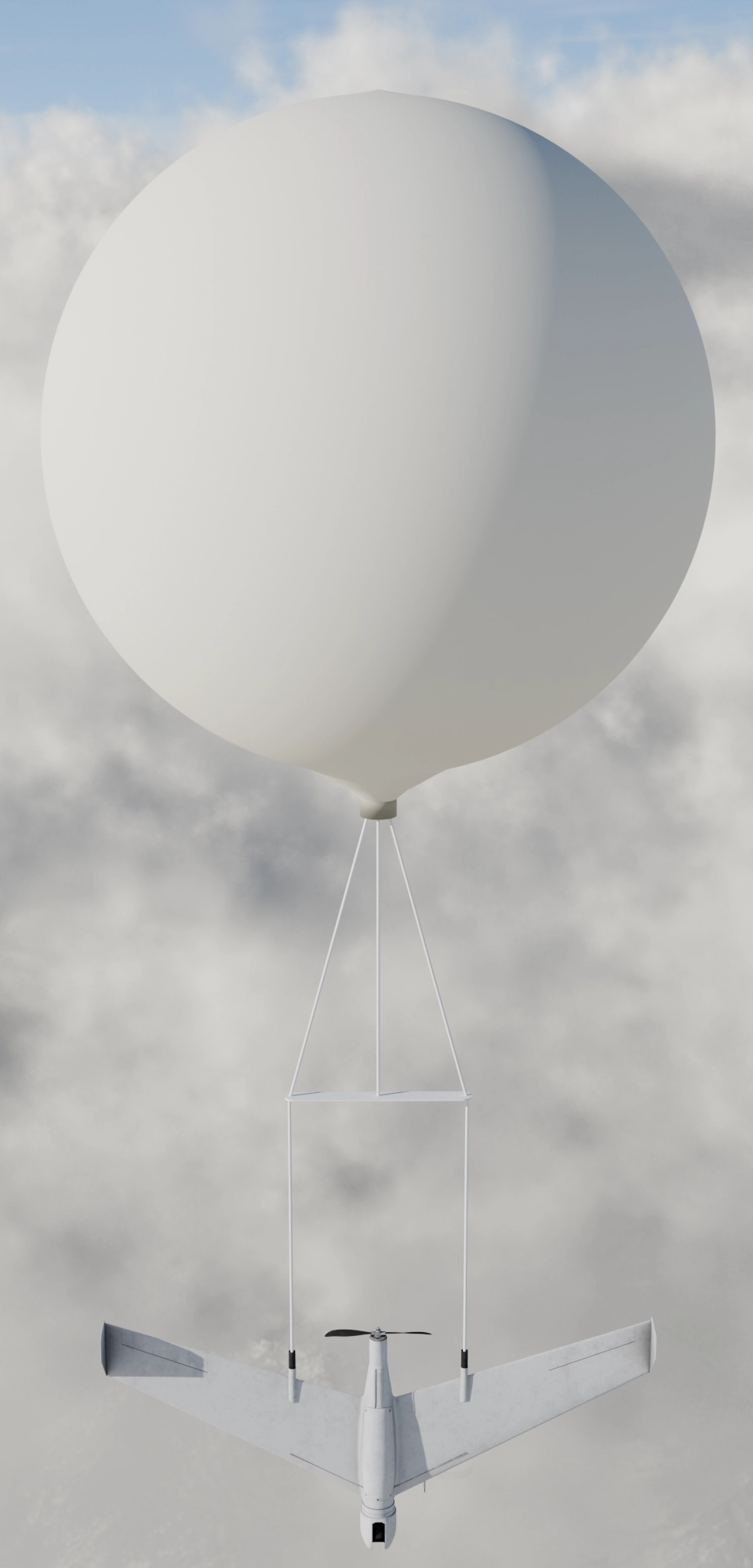
3D design of a UAV high-altitude balloon launch

As of 2020, seventeen countries have armed UAVs, and more than 100 countries use UAVs in a military capacity. The first five countries producing domestic UAV designs are Turkey, United States, China, Israel and Iran. Top military UAV manufactures include Baykar, General Atomics, Elbit Systems, Rafael Advanced Defense Systems, Lockheed Martin, Northrop Grumman, Boeing, Turkish Aerospace Industries, IAIO, CASC and CAIG. China has established and expanded its presence in military UAV market since 2010. In the early 2020s, Turkey also established and expanded its presence in the military UAV market.

In the early 2010s, Israeli companies mainly focused on small surveillance UAV systems, and by the number of drones, Israel exported 60.7% (2014) of UAVs on the market while the United States exported 23.9% (2014). Between 2010 and 2014, there were 439 drones exchanged compared to 322 in the five years previous to that, among these only small fraction of overall trade – just 11 (2.5%) of the 439 are armed drones. The US alone operated over 9,000 military UAVs in 2014; among them more than 7000 are RQ-11 Raven miniature UAVs. Since 2010, Chinese drone companies have begun to export large quantities of drones to the global military market. Of the 18 countries that are known to have received military drones between 2010 and 2019, the top 12 all purchased their drones from China. The shift accelerated in the 2020s due to China's advancement in drone technologies and manufacturing, compounded by market demand from the Russo-Ukrainian war and the Gaza war.

For intelligence and reconnaissance missions, the inherent stealth of micro UAV flapping-wing ornithopters, imitating birds or insects, offers potential for covert surveillance and makes them difficult targets to bring down.

Unmanned surveillance and reconnaissance aerial vehicle are used for reconnaissance, attack, demining, and target practice.

Since the start of the Russo-Ukrainian war, a dramatic increase in UAV development took place with Ukraine creating the Brave1 platform to promote rapid development of innovative systems. By 2025, Ukraine and Russia had both established their own dedicated UAV military commands, named the "Unmanned Systems Forces" (literally "Pilotless Systems Forces" (Note: Ukrainian: Сили безпілотних систем, СБС, romanized: Syly bezpilotnykh system, SBS, lit. '"Pilotless Systems Forces"'. Russian: Войска беспилотных систем [ВБС], romanized: Voyska bespilotnykh sistem [VBS], lit. '"Pilotless Systems Troops"'.)). Unlike Russia, Ukraine has been able to innovatively employ UAVs to deliver equipment like flexible medical stretchers or electric bicycles to help evacuate wounded soldiers from combat. Both militaries have made rapid progress in drone innovation whereby new developments happen in weeks instead of years due to the frequent interaction between military end users and defense contractors shortening feedback cycles. Reverse-engineering drone designs and strategies are also commonplace as shown by examples like Ukraine copying Russia's Molniya fixed-wing drones and Russia employing drone motherships equipped with Starlink.

The 2026 Iran war saw the crucial need for multiple countries to reevaluate their anti-drone capabilities in the wake of multiple missile and drone strikes that successfully hit military and civilian targets like airports, ports, and energy infrastructure throughout the Persian Gulf. During the war, Iran used thousands of mass-produced cheap drones like the Shahed-136 and missiles like the Fateh-110 which turned the Straits of Hormuz into a shooting gallery when Western air-defense missile stocks ran low. The costs of neutralizing a Shahed-136 was estimated at US$20,000 to US$50,000 compared to the expensive PATRIOT, THAAD, and Arrow-3 interceptor missiles which range from US$3 to US$12 million. The war created a surge in demand for Ukrainian interceptor drones and anti-drone expertise in the Gulf countries, Israel, Europe, and the United States. FPV-based interceptors like the P1-Sun, STING, JEDI, Octopus, and Shvidun can reach speeds of up to 300 km/h and cost as low as around US$1,000, thereby providing a cost-effective anti-drone solution as part of a multi-layered air defense network.

=== Civil applications ===
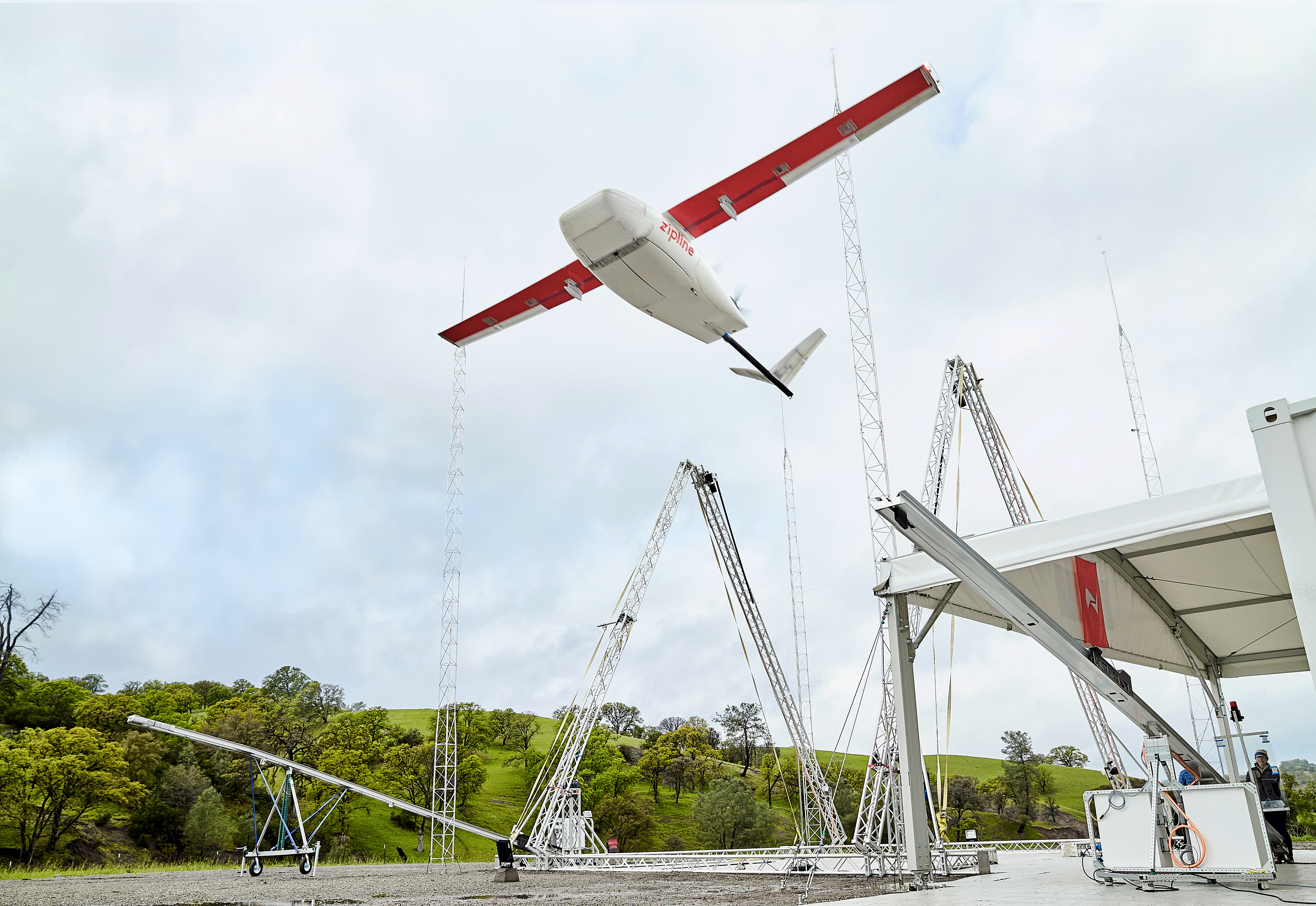
Zipline's aircraft being launched from a base in Rwanda to deliver blood products

The civilian (commercial and general) drone market is dominated by Chinese companies. Chinese manufacturer DJI alone had 74% of the civil market share in 2018, with no other company accounting for more than 5%. The companies continue to hold over 70% of global market share by 2023, despite being under increasing scrutiny and sanctions from the United States. The US Interior Department grounded its fleet of DJI drones in 2020, while the Justice Department prohibited the use of federal funds for the purchase of DJI and other foreign-made UAVs. DJI is followed by American company 3D Robotics, Chinese company Yuneec, Autel Robotics, and French company Parrot. In 2025, Chinese drone companies held 90% of the global UAV market share, with DJI accounting 80 percent of the world market.

As of May 2021, 873,576 UAVs had been registered with the US FAA, of which 42% were categorized as commercial and 58% as recreational. 2018 NPD point to consumers increasingly purchasing drones with more advanced features with 33 percent growth in both the $500+ and $1000+ market segments.

The civil UAV market is relatively new compared to the military one. Companies are emerging in both developed and developing nations at the same time. Many early-stage startups have received support and funding from investors, as is the case in the United States, and from government agencies, as is the case in India. Some universities offer research and training programs or degrees. Private entities also provide online and in-person training programs for both recreational and commercial UAV use.

Consumer drones are widely used by police and military organizations worldwide because of the cost-effective nature of consumer products. Since 2018, the Israeli military have used DJI UAVs for light reconnaissance missions. DJI drones have been used by Chinese police in Xinjiang since 2017 and American police departments nationwide since 2018. Both Ukraine and Russia used commercial DJI drones extensively during the Russian invasion of Ukraine. These civilian DJI drones were sourced by governments, hobbyists, and international donations to Ukraine and Russia to support each side on the battlefield. They were often flown by drone hobbyists recruited by the armed forces. The prevalence of DJI drones was attributable to their market dominance, affordability, high performance, and reliability.

==== Aerial photography ====
Drones are ideally suited to capturing aerial shots in photography and cinematography, and are widely used for this purpose. Small drones avoid the need for precise coordination between pilot and cameraman, with the same person taking on both roles. Larger drones equipped with professional cinema cameras usually have a drone pilot and a camera operator who controls the camera angle and lens. For example, the AERIGON cinema drone, used in film production, is operated by two people. Drones provide access to dangerous, remote, or otherwise inaccessible sites.

==== Agriculture, forestry and environmental studies ====
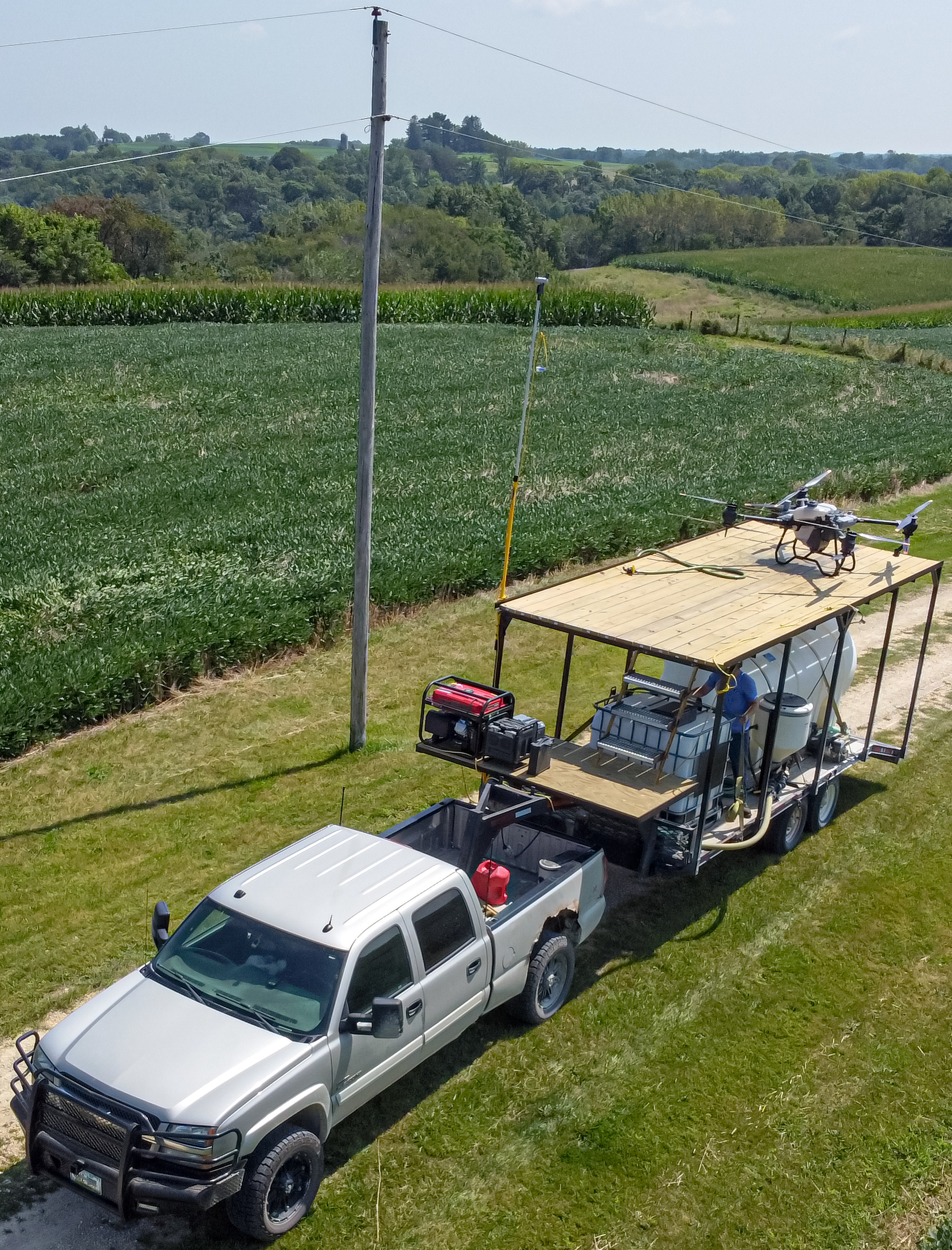
Agricultural drone on trailer setup

As global demand for food production grows exponentially, resources are depleted, farmland is reduced, and agricultural labor is increasingly in short supply, there is an urgent need for more convenient and smarter agricultural solutions than traditional methods, and the agricultural drone and robotics industry is expected to make progress. Agricultural drones have been used to help build sustainable agriculture all over the world leading to a new generation of agriculture. In this context, there is a proliferation of innovations in both tools and methodologies which allow precise description of vegetation state and also may help to precisely distribute nutrients, pesticides or seeds over a field.

The use of UAVs is also being investigated to help detect and fight wildfires, whether through observation or launching pyrotechnic devices to start backfires.

UAVs are also now widely used to survey wildlife such as nesting seabirds, seals and even wombat burrows. With consumer-grade UAVs and deep learning methods becoming increasingly available and affordable, UAV images are also useful for monitoring ecosystems and land cover, since their high resolution enables species-level identification of trees or delineation of inanimate objects.

==== Entertainment ====
Drones are also used in nighttime displays for artistic and advertising purposes, with the main benefits being that they are safer, quieter, and better for the environment than fireworks. They can replace or be an adjunct to fireworks displays to reduce the financial burden of festivals. In addition they can complement fireworks due to the ability for drones to carry them, creating new forms of artwork in the process.

Drones can also be used for racing, either with or without VR functionality.

==== Mapping ====
UASs or UAVs offer a great advantage for environmental monitoring to generate a new generation of survey at very-high or ultra-high resolution both in space and time. This enables integration between satellites data and field-based monitoring. This has stimulated a huge number of activities in order to enhance the description of natural and agricultural ecosystems. Most common applications are:

- Topographic surveys for the production of orthomosaics, digital surface models and 3D models;
- Monitoring of natural ecosystems for biodiversity monitoring, habitat mapping, detection of invasive alien species and study of ecosystem degradation due to invasive species or disturbances;
- Precision agriculture which exploits all available technologies including UAV in order to produce more with less (e.g., optimisation of fertilizers, pesticides, irrigation);
- River monitoring several methods have been developed to perform flow monitoring using image velocimetry methods which allow to properly describe the 2D flow velocity fields.
- Structural integrity of any type of structure whether it be a dam, railway or other dangerous, inaccessible or massive locations for building monitoring.
- Mineral detection for acid mine drainage using UAVs and hyperspectral cameras can produce detailed maps of proxy minerals (e.g. goethite, jarosite) for certain pH-values in natural, mining and post-mining environments, such as remediated sites.
- In-situ gas measurements in potentially hazardous places like volcanic plumes.

These activities can be completed with different measurements, such as photogrammetry, thermography, multispectral images, 3D field scanning, gas detectors, and normalized difference vegetation index maps.

===== Geological hazards =====
UAVs have become a widely used tool for studying geohazards such as landslides. Various sensors, including radar, optical, and thermal, can be mounted on UAVs to monitor different properties. UAVs enable the capture of images of various landslide features, such as transverse, radial, and longitudinal cracks, ridges, scarps, and surfaces of rupture, even in inaccessible areas of the sliding mass. Moreover, processing the optical images captured by UAVs also allows for the creation of point clouds and 3D models, from which these properties can be derived. Comparing point clouds obtained at different times allows for the detection of changes caused by landslide deformation.

==== Humanitarian aid ====
Drones are increasingly finding their application in humanitarian aid and disaster relief, where they are used for a wide range of applications such as delivering food, medicine and essential items to remote areas or image mapping before and following disasters.

==== Law enforcement ====
Police can use drones for applications such as search and rescue and traffic monitoring.

==== Mineral exploration ====
UAVs may help in the discovery of new or reevaluation of known mineral deposits to meet the demand for raw materials such as critical raw metals (e.g. cobalt, nickel), rare earths and battery minerals. By employing a suite of sensors (e.g. spectral imaging, Lidar, magnetics, gamma-ray spectroscopy), and similar to those used in environmental monitoring, UAV-based data can produce maps of geological surface and subsurface features, contributing to more efficient and targeted mineral exploration.

== Safety and security ==
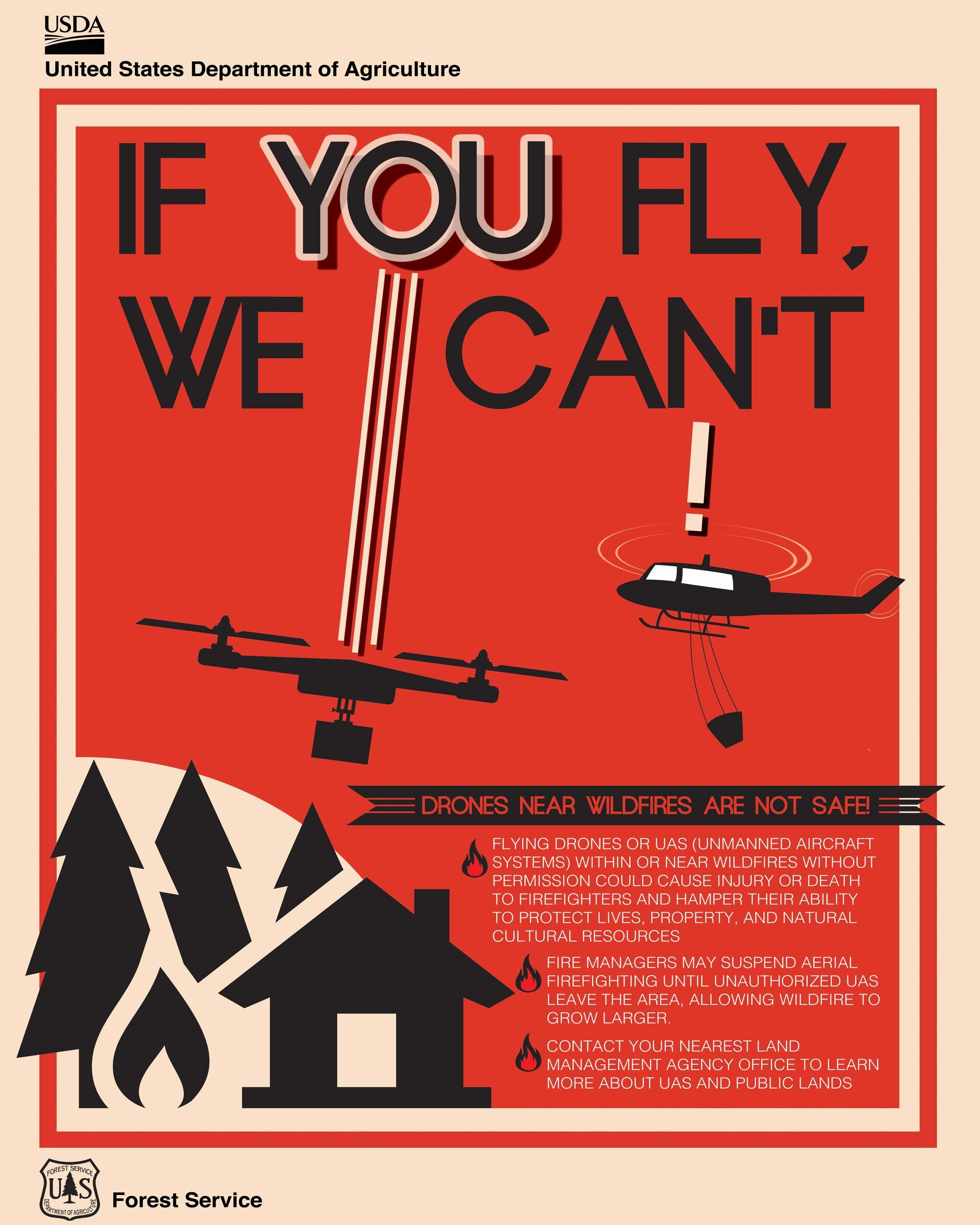
US Department of Agriculture poster warning about the risks of flying UAVs near wildfires

=== Threats ===
==== Nuisance ====
UAVs can threaten airspace security in numerous ways, including unintentional collisions or other interference with other aircraft, deliberate attacks or by distracting pilots or flight controllers. The first incident of a drone-airplane collision occurred in mid-October 2017 in Quebec City, Canada. The first recorded instance of a drone collision with a hot air balloon occurred on 10 August 2018 in Driggs, Idaho, United States; although there was no significant damage to the balloon nor any injuries to its three occupants, the balloon pilot reported the incident to the National Transportation Safety Board, stating that "I hope this incident helps create a conversation of respect for nature, the airspace, and rules and regulations". Unauthorized UAV flights into or near major airports have prompted extended shutdowns of commercial flights.

Drones caused significant disruption at Gatwick Airport during December 2018, needing the deployment of the British Army.

In the United States, flying close to a wildfire is punishable by a maximum $25,000 fine. Nonetheless, in 2014 and 2015, firefighting air support in California was hindered on several occasions, including at the Lake Fire and the North Fire. In response, California legislators introduced a bill that would allow firefighters to disable UAVs which invaded restricted airspace. The FAA later required registration of most UAVs.

==== Security vulnerabilities ====
By 2017, drones were being used to drop contraband into prisons.

The interest in UAVs cybersecurity has been raised greatly after the Predator UAV video stream hijacking incident in 2009, where Islamic militants used cheap, off-the-shelf equipment to stream video feeds from a UAV. Another risk is the possibility of hijacking or jamming a UAV in flight. Several security researchers have made public some vulnerabilities in commercial UAVs, in some cases even providing full source code or tools to reproduce their attacks. At a workshop on UAVs and privacy in October 2016, researchers from the Federal Trade Commission showed they were able to hack into three different consumer quadcopters and noted that UAV manufacturers can make their UAVs more secure by the basic security measures of encrypting the Wi-Fi signal and adding password protection.

Cybersecurity risks in unmanned aircraft systems extend beyond wireless communication vulnerabilities. These systems also depend on supporting communication networks, ground-based stations, onboard software, sensors, and payloads. Wang et al. (2023) classify UAS cybersecurity threats into four categories: communication network security, software security, payload security, and intelligent security. The latter includes vulnerabilities in artificial intelligence algorithms used for autonomous navigation and mission execution. Attacks against these components can compromise the confidentiality, integrity, and availability of an entire system. Consequently, cybersecurity assessments must consider the interconnected aircraft, ground infrastructure, and communication systems rather than focusing exclusively on the aircraft itself. This broader approach also helps identify weaknesses that may arise from interactions between otherwise separate system components.

==== Privacy ====
A challenging issue is handling aerial drone technology within privacy laws.

==== Aggression ====
Many UAVs have been loaded with dangerous payloads, and/or crashed into targets. Payloads have included or could include explosives, chemical, radiological or biological hazards. UAVs with generally non-lethal payloads could possibly be hacked and put to malicious purposes. Counter-UAV systems (C-UAS), from detection to electronic warfare to UAVs designed to destroy other UAVs, are in development and being deployed by states to counter this threat.

Such developments have occurred despite the difficulties. As J. Rogers stated in a 2017 interview to A&T, "There is a big debate out there at the moment about what the best way is to counter these small UAVs, whether they are used by hobbyists causing a bit of a nuisance or in a more sinister manner by a terrorist actor".

=== Countermeasures ===
==== Counter unmanned air system ====
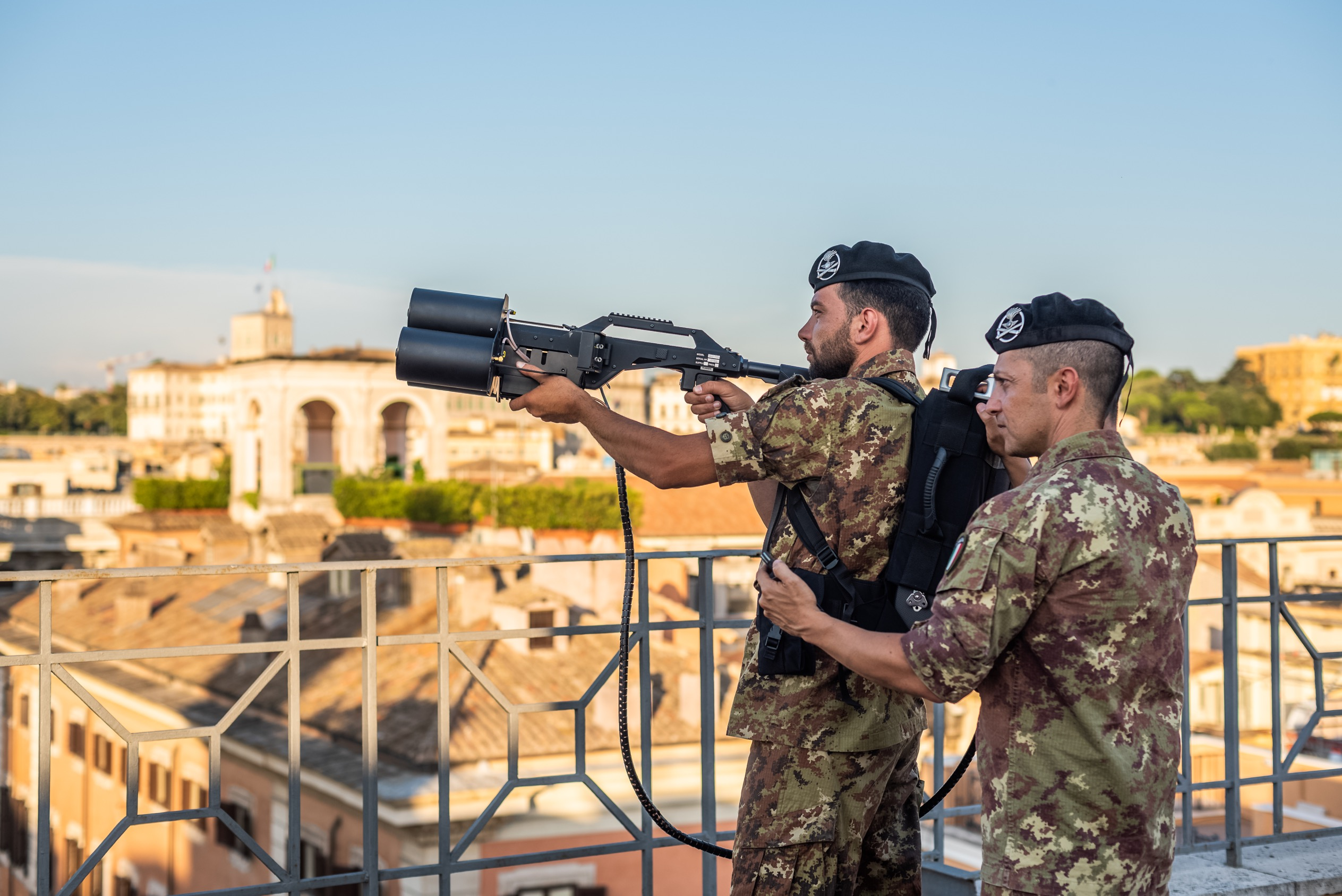
Italian Army soldiers of the 17th Anti-aircraft Artillery Regiment "Sforzesca" with a portable drone jammer in Rome

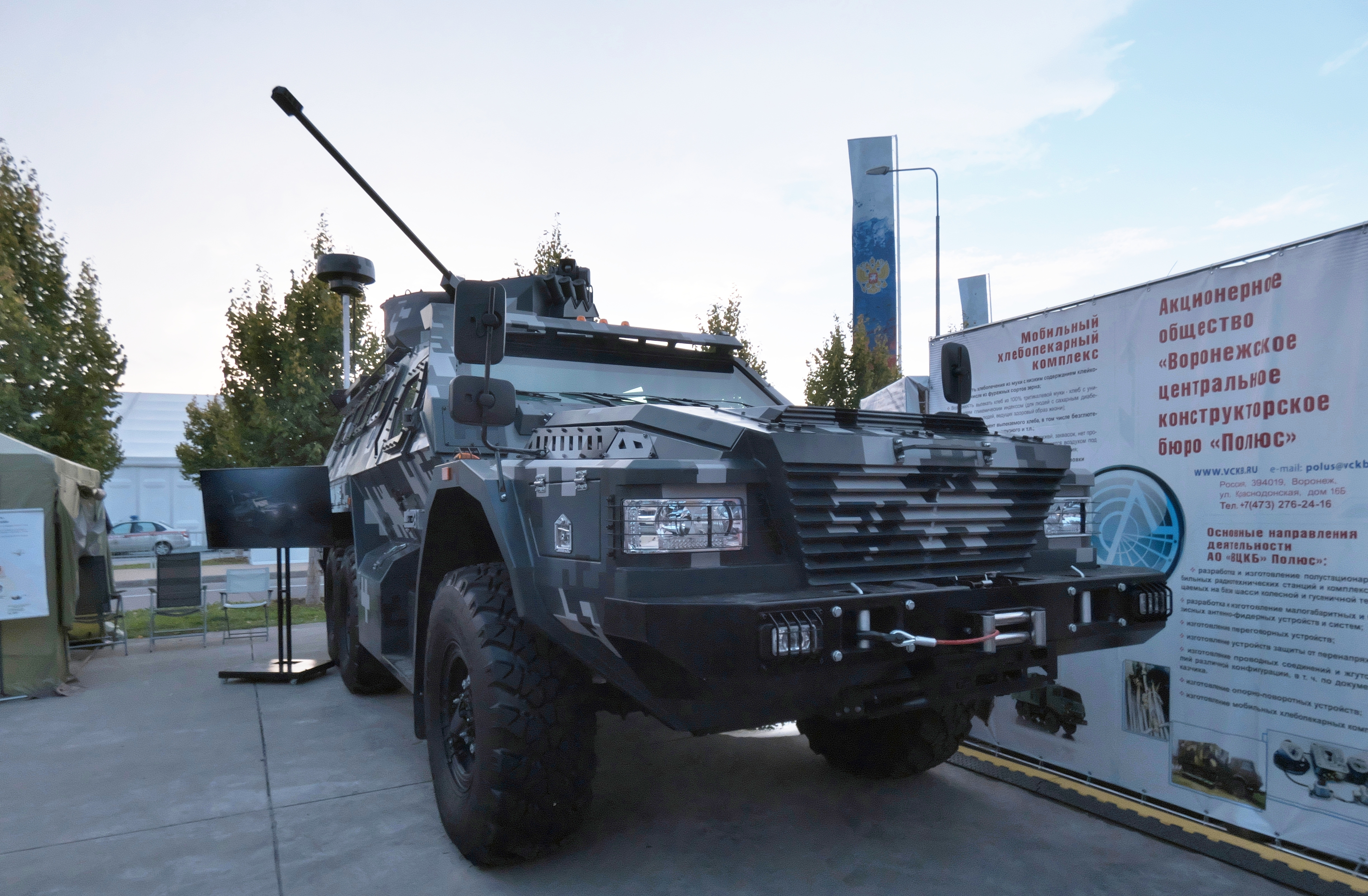
Cannon anti-drone system

The malicious use of UAVs has led to the development of counter unmanned air system (C-UAS) technologies. Automatic tracking and detection of UAVs from commercial cameras have become accurate thanks to the development of deep learning based machine learning algorithms. It is also possible to automatically identify UAVs across different cameras with different viewpoints and hardware specification with re-identification methods. Commercial systems such as the Aaronia AARTOS have been installed on major international airports. Once a UAV is detected, it can be countered with kinetic force (missiles, projectiles or another UAV) or by non-kinetic force (laser, microwaves, communications jamming). Anti-aircraft missile systems such as the Iron Dome are also being enhanced with C-UAS technologies. Utilising a smart UAV swarm to counter one or more hostile UAVs is also proposed.

A variety of counter-UAS (C-UAS) systems have been developed globally to address the growing threat of small and tactical UAVs. These include multi-layered approaches combining radar, electro-optical sensors, radio frequency detection, and jamming technologies. Among them are systems developed by Elbit Systems, such as the ReDrone™ suite, which includes both fixed and portable configurations for detection and mitigation of drones in civilian and military environments. The Red Sky 2 system, also developed by Elbit, integrates multiple sensors and effectors and is designed to protect strategic sites from low-altitude aerial threats. Other developers, such as AirSight, specialize in the software and systems integration layer of C-UAS, utilizing AI and machine learning to analyze sensor data for drone detection and threat assessment in complex environments, as demonstrated by the launch of their AirGuard V3.18 system.

=== Regulation ===
Regulatory bodies around the world are developing unmanned aircraft system traffic management solutions to better integrate UAVs into airspace.

The use of unmanned aerial vehicles is becoming increasingly regulated by the civil aviation authorities of individual countries. Regulatory regimes can differ significantly according to drone size and use. The International Civil Aviation Organization (ICAO) began exploring the use of drone technology as far back as 2005, which resulted in a 2011 report. France was among the first countries to set a national framework based on this report and larger aviation bodies such as the FAA and the EASA quickly followed suit. In 2021, the FAA published a rule requiring all commercially used UAVs and all UAVs regardless of intent weighing 250 g or more to participate in Remote ID, which makes drone locations, controller locations, and other information public from takeoff to shutdown; this rule has since been challenged in the pending federal lawsuit RaceDayQuads v. FAA.

In April 2026, China has introduced strict rules for recreational and civilian drones, require registration, IDs, real name, permit and real time monitoring. Beijing enacted near a total ban, limiting sales, transport and flights within the city. The regulation aim to ensure safety, manage low altitude airspace and address security.

==== EU Drone Certification – Class Identification Label ====
The implementation of the Class Identification Label serves a crucial purpose in the regulation and operation of drones. The label is a verification mechanism designed to confirm that drones within a specific class meet the rigorous standards set by administrations for design and manufacturing. These standards are necessary to ensure the safety and reliability of drones in various industries and applications.

By providing this assurance to customers, the Class Identification Label helps to increase confidence in drone technology and encourages wider adoption across industries. This, in turn, contributes to the growth and development of the drone industry and supports the integration of drones into society.

==== Export controls ====
The export of UAVs or technology capable of carrying a 500 kg payload at least 300 km is restricted in many countries by the Missile Technology Control Regime.

== See also ==
- Drone in a box
- Fiber optic drone
- Glide bomb
- International Aerial Robotics Competition
- List of films featuring drones
- List of military electronics of the United States
- List of unmanned aerial vehicles
- Interceptor drone
- Micromechanical Flying Insect
- Optionally piloted vehicle
- Sypaq Corvo Precision Payload Delivery System
- Satellite Sentinel Project
- Tactical Control System
- Unmanned underwater vehicle
