= MultiGP =

- Sport: Drone racing
- Category: Air sports
- Jurisdiction: International
- Abbreviation: MGP
- Founded: 2015
- Headquarters: Palm Bay, Florida
- CEO: Chris Thomas

Official website
- www.multigp.com
- Other key staff: Shawn Ames (COO); Mark Grohe (Head of Events); Roger Bess (Head of Development); Clare Cannizzaro (Head of Sales); Enrico Moizo {Head of Marketing & Communication); Michelle Brooks (Head of Finance); Doug Kling (Technical Magician); Joe Scully (Spokesman); Shannon Broussard, Tom Cinnamon (Chapter support); Paul Adkins (Race director)

MultiGP is a global drone racing league and FPV Drone racing community. It governs and manages radio-controlled drone racing competitions. With over 38,539 members and 385 chapters worldwide, MultiGP is the only drone racing league with available methods for participation and advancement within the league. MultiGP governs and sanctions drone racing events across the world, provides race production services, and works with groups to grow the sport of drone racing.

Founded by Chris Thomas in February 2015, this drone racing league has been involved in the organization and management of over 16,000 races across the world and created the first national (United States of America) performance-based drone racing championship. This Championship held stringent qualification requirements for entry, not just the price of admission.

MultiGP offices are located in Palm Bay, Florida.

MultiGP is a Special Interest Group (SIG) with The Academy of Model Aeronautics (AMA) and has agreed to cooperate in the communications, development, competition, and continued safety efforts of the FPV racing community within the AMA.

== History ==
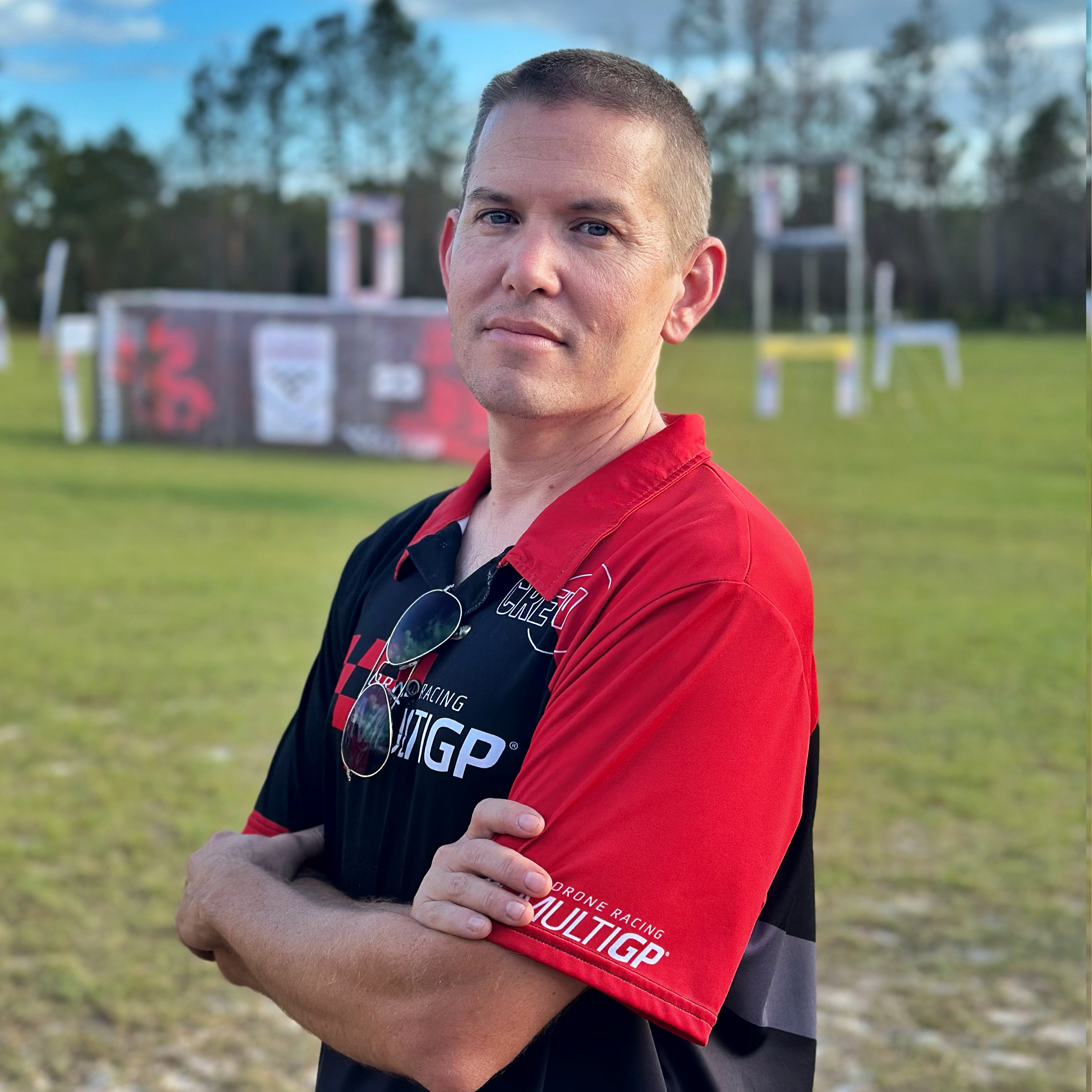
Chris Thomas, CEO

In January 2015, Chris Thomas became involved with his local flying club, Brevard Multirotor. This group of FPV enthusiasts was holding events and races in the Brevard County region of Florida. At the time, there was a need for someone to step in and help the pilots manage video frequencies and better organize the events in the area. Thomas stepped in and created a spreadsheet and some frequency cards that helped manage the races. In the last weeks of February 2015, MultiGP was created and started aiding local races in the Central Florida area. The first major event MultiGP assisted with was the CFL FPV event held in Leesburg, FL, the last weekend in March 2015.

Shortly thereafter in the spring of 2015, co-founding members were introduced including James Vaello as vice president and Michael Gianoutsos as Chief Marketing Officer. Accreditations include:

- Being awarded as the Academy of Model Aeronautic's Special Interest Group for FPV.
- Developing the first comprehensive incentive system to build and support the community from within.
- Developing the first ever true national drone racing championship with local and regional qualifiers with the assistance of Gregg Novosad.
- Defining racing classes.
- Developing and publishing universal time-trial-tracks (UTT) with associated leaderboards to allow pilots to be ranked worldwide.
- Establishing interactive event management software to help race organizers successfully run event.
- Publishing real time track results.
- Solidifying trademarks and brands in a competitive environment.

MultiGP developed a web-based application that would replace spreadsheet and frequency cards in order for FPV pilots to fly while sharing bandwidth. RaceSync is the proprietary software that assigns racing slots and video frequencies in real time, and allows pilots to use their smartphones to check in when they arrive for a race and assign them a race slot and optimum video frequency which will not interfere with the other pilots in the race.

== Racing classes ==
Beginning in 2015, MultiGP created a set of defined racing classes which level the playing field so one pilot does not have an advantage over another by using more powerful equipment. This allows the pilot's skill to win the race rather than their equipment.

As of 2016, MultiGP has defined classes in Multirotors, Race Wings and Fixed Wings.

In the 2018 season, the official racing class for the MultiGP Regional Series was changed to the Open Class, lifting restrictions on battery voltage.

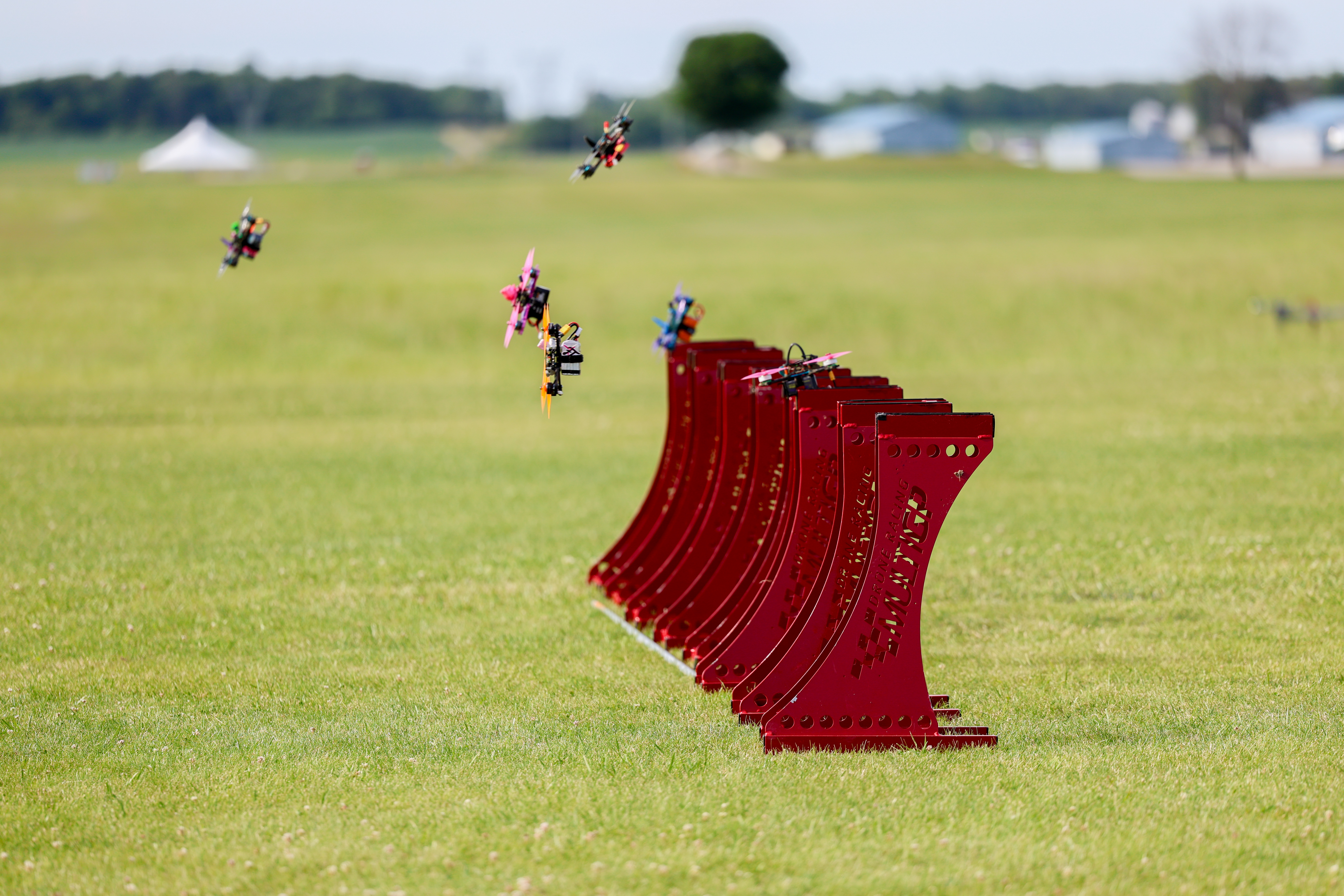
Open Class Quadcopters starting from pro launcher stands.

As the years have passed and drone technology has rapidly advanced, race classes have become increasingly well-defined. Below is a table of the current race class configurations.

In June 2024, MultiGP introduced a new race class, the 7" Pro Spec, which features drones equipped with standardized 7-inch components.

RACE CLASS	Frame	Props	Motor	Battery	Weight
Open Class	Maximum Size: 305mm (furthest distance diagonal between motors)	No Limit	No Limit		
7" Pro Spec	Pro Stock Frame	7" decided each event	Any 2808 or less sized		
Whoop	65mm ducted	31mm max	Brushed or Brushles and size		
Freedom Spec	No Limit	HQ R38 Headsup Prop			
Micro	No Limit	3.1"	Motor 1404 4500-4600 KV		

== MultiGP Universal Time Trial Tracks ==
In 2015, MultiGP introduced the first Universal Time Trial Track. Universal Time Trial Tracks allow FPV pilots to compete against each other across the world by providing standardized local courses partnered with a global leaderboard.

As of 2017, there are currently (7) different Universal Time Trial Tracks.

== MultiGP Championship (World championship) ==
=== The National Championship ===
In 2016, MultiGP introduced the Regional Series and National Championship race format. The MultiGP Regional Series allows pilots to compete on local, regional and ultimately a national level via the 2016 MultiGP Drone Racing Championships.

The first-of-its-kind performance-based drone racing championship was held at AMA headquarters in Muncie, Indiana on September 4, 2016. Over 100 pilots arrived on-site to battle for this Championship event.

=== The Global Qualifier (2018–current), from National to World Championship ===
Since 2018, MultiGP introduced the Global Qualifier. The Global Qualifier serves as the primary pathway for drone pilots to qualify for the MultiGP Championship. Every FPV Drone Racing pilot in the world can participate in the Global Qualifier. Each MultiGP chapter is in fact allowed to construct an identical race track as per MultiGP's specifications, ensuring that all participants compete on the same course regardless of their location. Every year, more than 150 Global Qualifier events are held worldwide to create the Global Leaderboard, also known as "The List". MultiGP uses this leaderboard to select and invite pilots for the PRO and SPORT classes of the MultiGP Championship.

=== List of MultiGP World Championship Winners ===
Year	Date	Pilot		Callsign	Location
2015	December 6	Shaun Taylor	United States	Nytfury	Orlando, Florida
2016	September 4	Shaun Taylor	United States	Nytfury	Muncie, Indiana
2017	September 17	Alex Vanover	United States	Captainvanover	Reno, Nevada
2018	February 10, 2019	Evan Turner	United States	HeadsUpFPV	Las Vegas, Nevada
2019	November 17	Evan Turner	United States	HeadsUpFPV	Daytona Beach, Florida
2020	November 8	Soren Monroe-Anderson	United States	phatkid	Melbourne, Florida
2021		Evan Turner	United States	HeadsUpFPV	
2022	October 17	MinChan Kim	South Korea	MCK FPV	No Quarter Ranch, Citrus Springs, Florida
2023	October 30	MinChan Kim	South Korea	MCK FPV	No Quarter Ranch, Citrus Springs, Florida
2024	October 26	Pawel Laszczak	Poland	Pawelos	No Quarter Ranch, Citrus Springs, Florida
