= Fat Shark =

Chinese manufacturing company

Logo

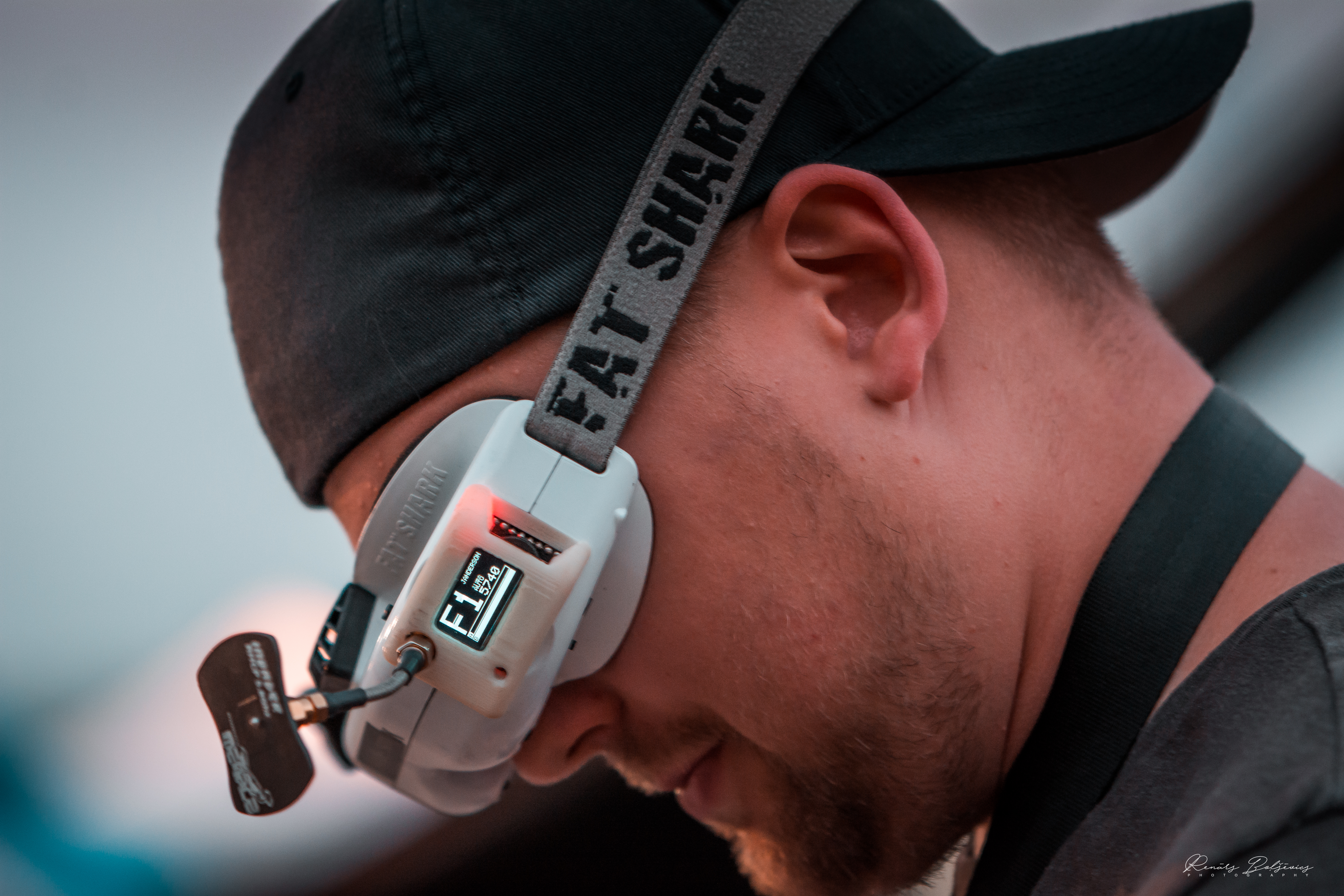
Fat Shark goggles in use

Fat Shark, founded in 2007, manufactures FPV (where FPV stands for first-person view) headsets for drone racing. Their headsets utilize radio technology to show the user a live video feed that is broadcast from a drone. Fat Shark headsets have been showcased at the Consumer Electronics Show Drone Rodeo in 2015 and 2017. In 2016, Fat Shark received a Terry Award by the for first-place FPV item, an award voted on by hobbyists through HobbyKing. Multiple Fat Shark products were recommended for hobbyist drone pilots in the 2017 Drone Enthusiast list of "Best FPV Goggles & Gadgets." Fat Shark holds an annual drone racing event called the Fat Shark Frenzy and Drone Olympics in Ontario. and was a major sponsor to the first annual U.S. National Drone Racing Championships in 2015.

As of 2020, Fat Shark is a leading brand of goggles for drone racers.

Fat Shark founder is Greg French and is headquartered in Shenzhen, China. Redcat Holdings acquired the company in mid 2020.
