= Yarovenko =

Yarovenko (Ukrainian: Яровенко) is a surname. Notable people with the surname include:

- Evgeny Yarovenko (born 1963), Soviet footballer and coach
- Natasha Yarovenko (born 1979), Ukrainian actress and model

== See also ==
- Yakovenko
