= Yakovenko =

Yakovenko, Iakovenko or Jakovenko (Cyrillic: Яковенко) is a gender-neutral surname of Ukrainian-Jewish origin, derived from the first name Yakov (the Ukrainian equivalent of Jacob or James) and effectively means of Jacob/Jacob's. Notable people with the surname include:

- Alexander Yakovenko, multiple people
- Anastasia Chursina (née Yakovenko in 1995), Russian racing cyclist
- Boris Yakovenko (1884–1949), Russian philosopher
- Dmitry Jakovenko (born 1983) is a Russian chess player
- Dmytro Yakovenko (disambiguation), multiple people
- Dmitri Yakovenko (born 1981), Russian screenwriter and director
- Margaryta Yakovenko (born 1992), Spanish language journalist and novelist born in Tokmak, Ukraine.
- Mariya Yakovenko (born 1982), Russian javelin thrower
- Natalia Yakovenko (born 1942), Ukrainian historian, Doctor of Historical Sciences
- Nikolay Yakovenko (1941–2006), Russian wrestler
- Olha Iakovenko (born 1987), Ukrainian race walker
- Pavlo Yakovenko (born 1964), Ukrainian footballer
- Sergei Yakovenko (born 1976), Kazakhstani ice hockey player
- Serhiy Yakovenko (born 1975), Ukrainian football coach and a former player
- Tetiana Yakovenko (born 1954), Ukrainian poet and literary critic
- Yuriy Yakovenko (born 1993), Ukrainian footballer
