= Ursula (drone) =

Unmanned surface vehicle

Ursula is the name of a riverine unmanned surface vehicle (USV) capable of carrying FPV drones. It was developed in Ukraine during the Russian invasion of Ukraine. It has been dubbed the world's smallest aircraft carrier.

== History ==
In December 2024, Ukraine used USVs carrying FPV drones to attack Russian oil platforms in the Black Sea that were equipped with radars and GPS jamming equipment.

In 2025, Ukraine began testing small USVs, called Black Widow 2, on rivers. They are around 1 metre (3.3 ft) long, weigh 8 kilograms (18 lb) and can carry a payload of 3 kilograms (6.6 lb). The Black Widow 2 prototype was unveiled in October 2024.

On 12 July 2025, Kyiv-based NoviTechNet revealed that they had developed an unmanned surface drone that is able to carry out reconnaissance tasks, carry FPV drones or operate as a floating mine.

== Description ==
The Ursula USV is around 1 metre (3.3 ft) long and it can perform several tasks. In addition to having a platform which can carry a FPV drone it can be outfitted with sensors or be armed with an explosive charge. It is battery-powered and due to its small profile it can hide among a river's flora. Due to its small size and ability to carry an FPV drone it has been called a "tiny aircraft carrier".
