= FPV Canada =

Canadian racing drone organization

- Sport: Drone Racing
- Abbreviation: FPVCAN
- Founded: May 2016
- Founder: Matthew Zoern
- Headquarters: Montreal, QC
- Area served: Canada
- Major events: 2016 Montreal Drone Expo; 2016/17 Canadian Drone Nationals; 2017 Vancouver Drone Expo
- Key people: Matthew Zoern (CEO); Tom Sorger (VP)
- Website: fpvcan.com

FPV Canada is the Canadian drone racing organization which includes franchise chapters in most major cities across the nation. FPV Canada's major events include Montreal Drone Expo and Canadian Drone Nationals 2016, Vancouver Drone Expo 2017 and Canadian Drone Nationals 2017.

Officially founded by Matthew Zoern in 2016, the organization began as FPV Montreal in late 2014. Continuing its growth as one of the most recognized names in the world of drone racing, they have worked with the RedBull F1 Racing team and flown at Montreal's Olympic Stadium. They were also featured on prominent Radio and TV news broadcasts including Discovery Channel and CTV National news as well as on a local news station.

== Key Dates ==
June 9, 2016 - Redbull F1 pilots experience drone racing first hand at Montreal's Olympic Stadium.

June 25, 2016 - FPV Canada hosted the Montreal Drone Expo held at Percival Molson Stadium, home of the Montreal Alouettes. The commentator for this event was David Whiddon

FPV Canada Groups (as of July 2017)

- FPV Montreal
- FPV Ottawa
- FPV Vancouver
- FPV Halifax
- FPV Toronto GTA
- FPV Windsor
- FPV Sherbrooke
- FPV Quebec
