= International Drone Racing Association =

International Drone Racing Association, Inc.
- Sport: Drone Racing
- Abbreviation: IDRA
- Founded: 3 April 2015
- Founders: Justin Haggerty; Charles Zablan
- Headquarters: Belleville, MI
- Area served: Worldwide
- Major events: 2017 Drone Racing Series; 2017 Challengers Cup; 2016 World Drone Prix
- Key people: Justin Haggerty (CEO); Bonnie Haggerty-Leister (CFO)
- Website: idra.co

The International Drone Racing Association, Inc. (IDRA) was a professional racing organization that sanctioned and governed multiple drone racing events. IDRA's major events and series' included the 2017 Challengers Cup, 2016 World Drone Prix, 2016 North America Cup, 2016 GiGA World Masters, and the 2015 California Cup.

== History ==
Justin Haggerty founded the company on 3 April 2015 to promote and build drone racing into a world renown sport. Early that summer, Co-Founder Charles Zablan joined the team and began preparing for the 2015 California Cup.

IDRA began working with the United Arab Emirates government and Aerial Grand Prix in October, 2015 to co-found and host the World Drone Prix in Dubai. The event, supported by Crown Prince Sheikh Hamdan bin Mohammed bin Rashid Al Maktou, was held at Skydive Dubai on 11 & 12 March 2016 for $1 Million in cash prizes.

On 7 April 2016, IDRA announced its merger with RotorSports (Drone Nationals and Drone Worlds), which would consolidate operations under the IDRA brand.

On 13 April 2016, IDRA and ESPN announced signing a three-year deal to broadcast drone races.

On 22 June 2016, IDRA terminated its merger with RotorSports, no longer sanctioning the 2016 U.S. Drone Nationals and 2016 Drone Worlds. The decision was made in order to protect the company from foreseen financial risks associated with RotorSports and the ESPN contract. The decision was later confirmed as the right course of action after the 2016 U.S. Drone Nationals and 2016 Drone Worlds was executed under budget, leaving ESPN to cancel the Drone Worlds broadcast after a mediocre production from Drone Nationals.

On 22 June 2016, IDRA announced partnership with Vuzix and Amimon to implement and help develop high-definition (HD) video receivers and compatible virtual reality (VR) goggles to drone racing.

On 6–7 August 2016, IDRA co-hosted, with the Korean Drone Racing Association (KDRA), the GiGA World Masters in Busan, South Korea. The event, sponsored by Korea Telecom, was broadcast on national television and enjoyed 50,000 spectators in its two days.

On 21 September 2016, IDRA hosted a Congressional Briefing in Washington, D.C. to announce their founding of the UAS STEM Alliance, a non-profit organization to promote STEM (Science, Technology, Engineering, and Mathematics) via drone technology and drone racing.

On 11–13 November 2016, IDRA was the Blast Off Sponsor for the first annual Drone Summit at Spaceport America, which included a speaking workshop, drone cinematography challenge, and drone racing event. IDRA's Founder & CEO, Justin Haggerty, was the Keynote Speaker for the Drone Summit.

On 2 December 2016, IDRA announced its semi-professional series the 2017 Challengers Cup on social media platforms.

On 26 January 2017, IDRA announced its professional series the 2017 Drone Racing Series on social media platforms. The Drone Racing Series, composed of 6 international races, will start in China and end with a finals in the Netherlands.

Additionally, on 26 January 2017, IDRA launched the first primary liability insurance ($1 Million Policy) for drone pilots. IDRA Members will receive worldwide coverage to fly recreationally, for practicing and training, and racing! In conjunction, IDRA also will offer event liability insurance ($2 Million Policy) to sanctioned race organizers around the world. IDRA's insurance service is another attempt to strengthen the growing drone community. To build the new insurance business, IDRA partnered with Avion Insurance, an insurance broker in Florida.

On 10 February 2017, IDRA announced, on social media, its 3YR agreement to distribute race content from the Drone Racing Series and Challengers Cup on Amazon Prime Instant Video.

On 2 March 2017, IDRA announced, on social media, a partnership with Dailymotion to distribute race content from the Drone Racing Series and Challengers Cup.

- es:Carreras de dron
