= Drone racing =

Sport where participants control drones

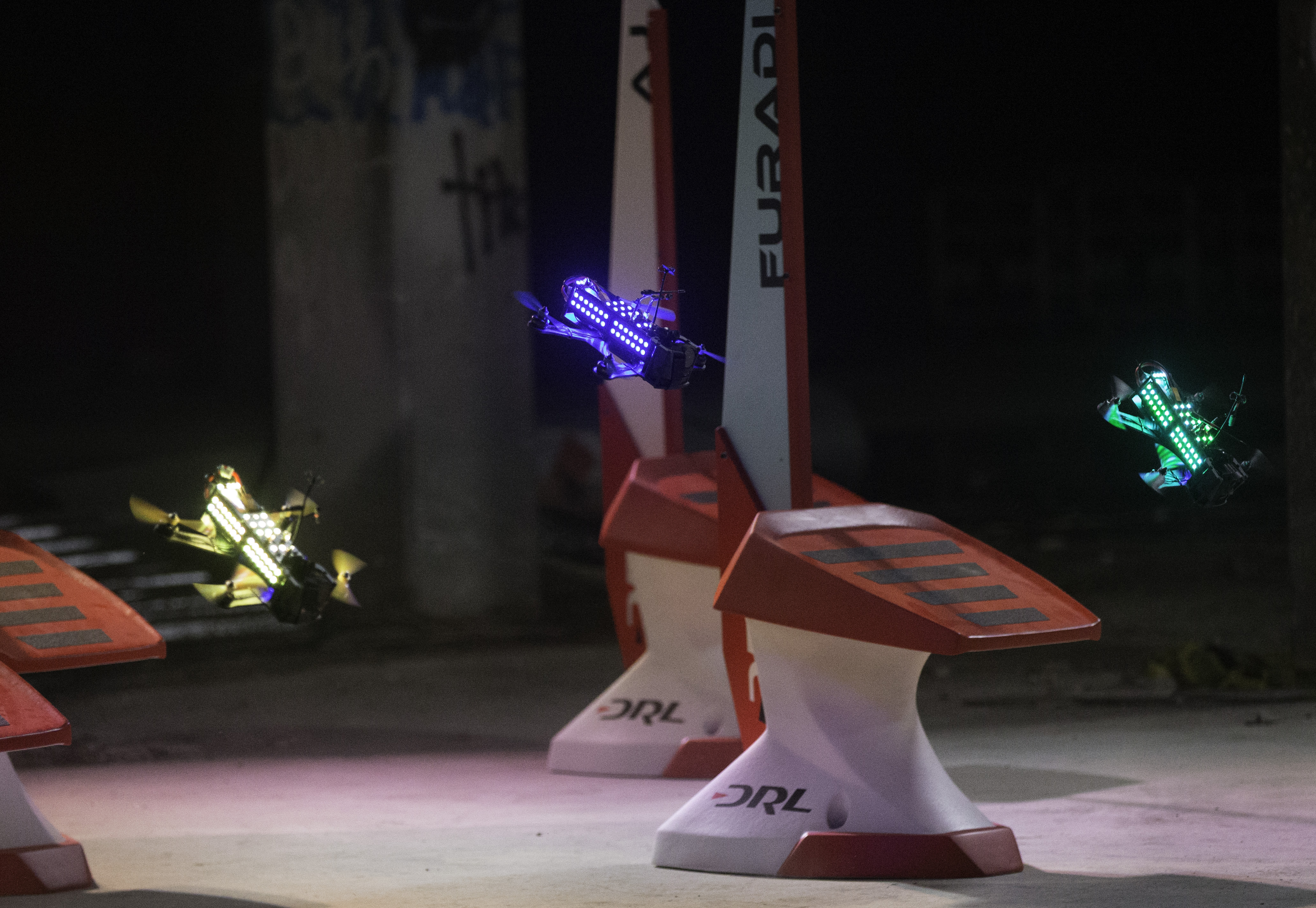
- Drones racing
- Highest governing body: MultiGP
- First played: Australia

Characteristics
- Contact: No
- Team members: Yes (depending on category)
- Mixed-sex: Yes
- Type: Air Motorsport
- Equipment: Unmanned aerial vehicle, head-mounted display, remote control

Presence
- Country or region: Worldwide
- Olympic: No
- Paralympic: No
- World Games: 2022

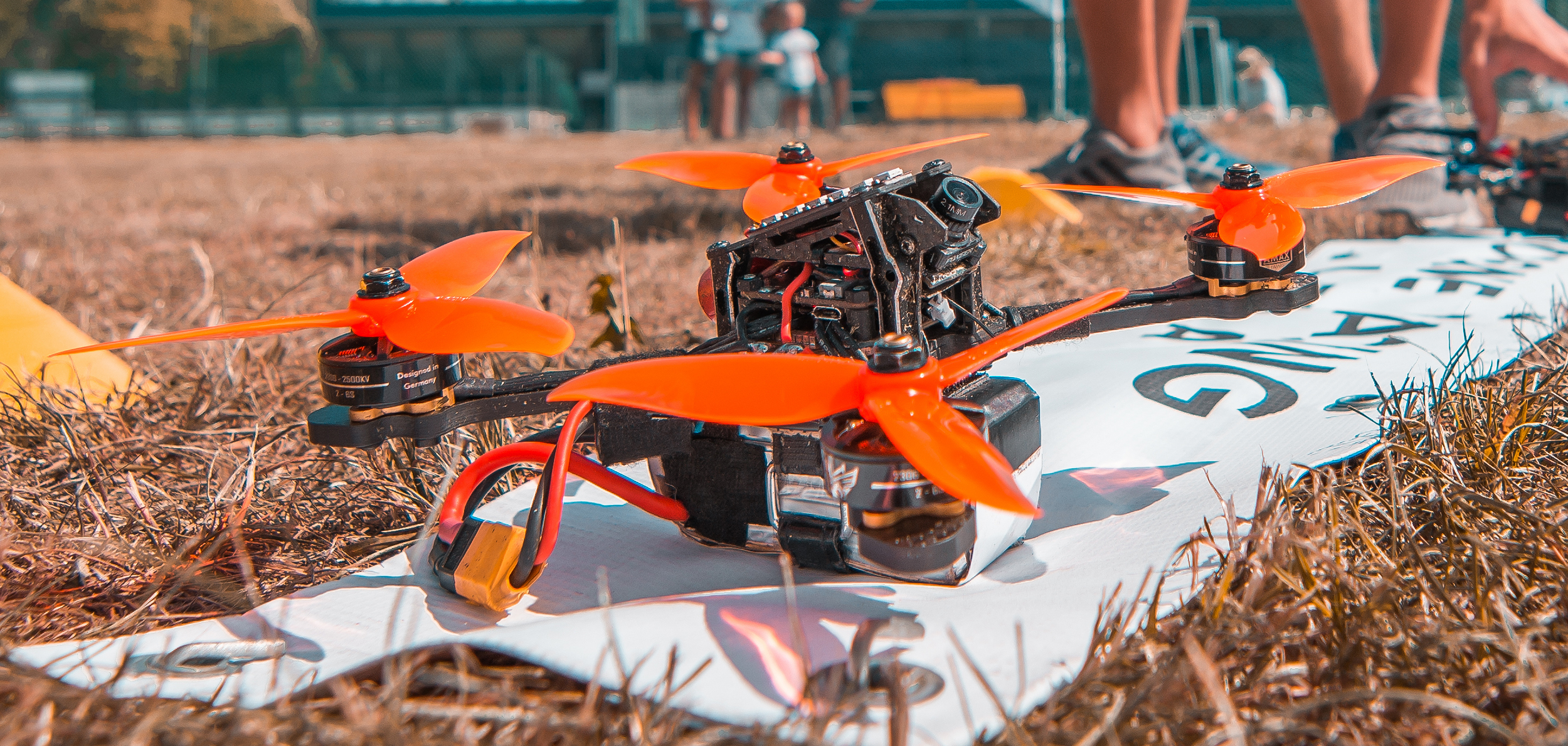
Close-up of a racing drone 2018.

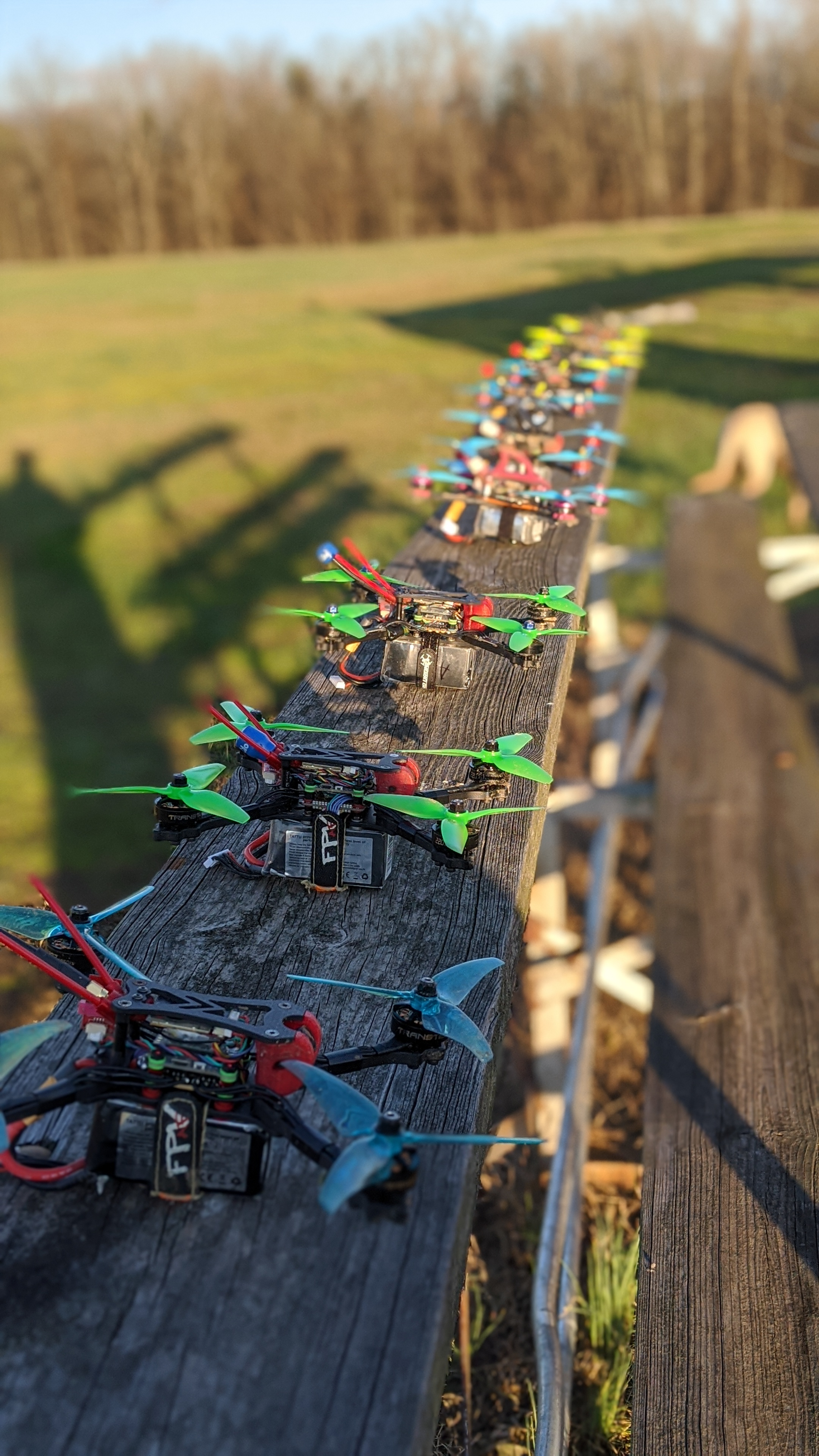
Racing drones lineup

A first person-view racing drone showing the drone's video perspective as it navigates obstacles.

Drone racing is a motorsport in which participants operate radio-controlled aircraft (typically small quadcopter drones) equipped with onboard digital video cameras. The operator views a compact flat panel display (typically mounted to the handheld controller) or, more often, wearing a head-mounted display (also called a "FPV goggle") that shows a live-streamed image feed from the aircraft. As with full-size air racing, the goal of the sport is to complete an obstacle course as quickly as possible. Drone racing began in 2011 in Germany with a number of amateur drone controllers getting together for semi-organized races in Karlsruhe.

== Technology ==
FPV (first-person view) camera means pilots see only what the drone sees. This is accomplished by live streaming footage from a camera mounted on the drone's nose. The image is transmitted as analog video or digital video (typically 2.4 GHz or 5.8 GHz frequency, 1.3 GHz for distant transmission) to goggles or a monitor worn by the pilot. The remote control, drone, and goggles are all connected via radio and must transmit with sufficient speed and reliability to allow effective control.

FPV goggles on the market range from $40 to $800, with the more expensive goggles offering more and better features. Some of these features include receiver diversity, digital HD video, head tracking, multiple frequency settings, band settings, and DVR (digital video recorder) recording functionality. Digital video systems come at a higher cost than their analog counterparts. They generally offer much better image quality, lower latency in some systems, and are now becoming much more commonplace.

While the pilot always requires goggles, some drone racing organizations insist they should also be used by spectators, simply switching the frequency to the channel of the racer the spectator wants to watch. Any drone could be used to race; however, competitive FPV racing leagues require drones to meet certain standards such as video transmission power limits to ensure all competitors get stable signal and safety requirements like failsafe disarming (stopping all motors instantly when connection to the pilot is lost.

For competitions, aircraft are typically separated into classes, categorizing them by propeller or wheel base size and power. With small indoor ducted drones called Tiny Whoops creating their own sub category. MultiGP Drone Racing has created a full definition of Race Class Specifications for racing drones to make the competition fair.

The Drone Racing League (DRL) makes all of the drones used in its events in-house; pilots are supplied with drones, backup drones, and parts by the league itself, not independently. This means that you only need sufficient knowledge to professionally race.

Specification (spec) racing is when all competitors are required to fly equal performing drones. This is done by requiring outlined battery, ESC, motor, propeller and flight controller firmware. These races are designed to challenge the pilots based on skill alone, and drones are typically much slower than open class racing.

DR1 Racing utilizes an open-specification class format that relies on each team in the series to supply their own drones, goggles, and gear. Recently, they added the Pro-Class racing drone, which is currently the largest competitive drone racing format in the world.

Racing drones are designed for speed and agility, as opposed to photography and video drones which are focused more on hovering and stable filming. A photography quadcopter design will typically have four motors configured in an X-pattern, all equally spaced apart. A racing model will typically have its four motors configured in an H-pattern configured to thrust the drone forward, not up. Another specific characteristic of drone racing is the number of propellers’ blades. 3-blade or 4-blade (instead of 2-blade) propellers have a shorter diameter, allowing for a smaller frame with increased acceleration and maneuverability capabilities. Because of their light weight and electric motors with large amounts of torque, drones can accelerate and maneuver with great speed and agility. This makes for very sensitive controls and requires a pilot with a quick reaction time and a steady hand. Racing drones also have their cameras situated at the front of the drone, since the drone always flies forwards and the pilot needs to be able to navigate. Photography drones usually have high-quality cameras situated on the front or bottom of the drone body with a gimbal, which allows the drone to film from multiple angles while hovering, as well as stabilizing the footage for video. The gimbal automatically rotates to smooth out the faster movements of the photography drone when compensating for wind or control inputs to deliver smooth video in all but the heaviest wind or emergency maneuvers.

BMW held the Drone Racing League's 2018 Semi-Finals race at their automobile museum, the BMW Welt, in Munich, Germany, and sold out the event.

== Piloting ==
The effect of camera tilt on an FPV drone. A higher camera angle requires a steeper forward pitch to keep the horizon in view.

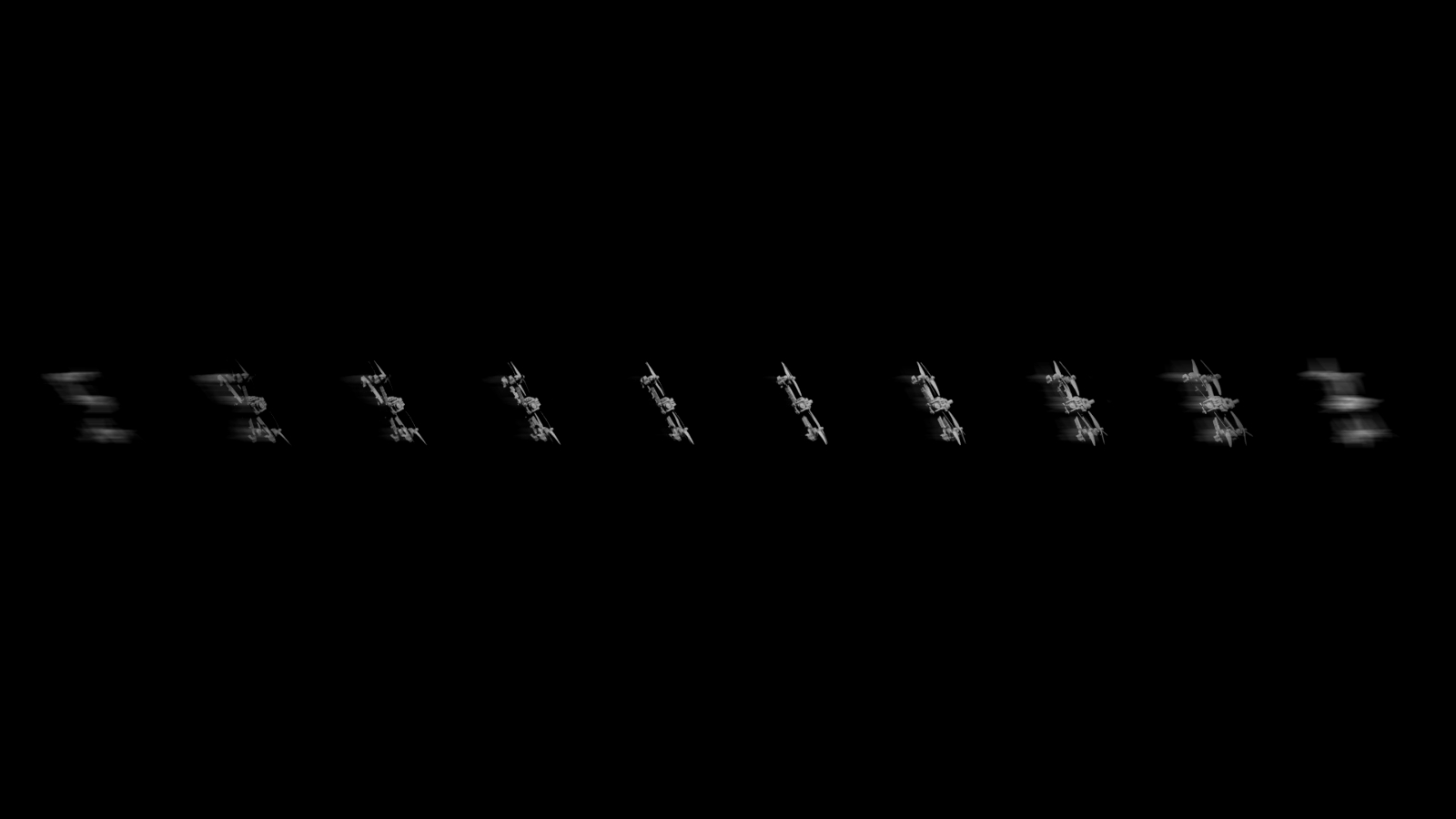
A stroboscopic capture of an FPV drone (Mario 5 frame) performing a turn. The image illustrates the flight path and banking angle into the turn, generated in CGI using Blender's Geometry Nodes.

Piloting a first-person view (FPV) drone requires significantly higher hand-eye coordination compared to stabilized commercial drones. The operator maintains total and continuous control of the aircraft from takeoff to landing, generally flying without flight assistance systems such as altitude hold, GPS positioning, or auto-leveling.

This manual flight mode, commonly referred to as Acro (acrobatic) or Rate mode, is the industry standard. It does not auto-correct the drone's attitude when the control sticks are released, thereby granting maximum maneuverability across all three dimensions. This level of control is an essential requirement for dynamic disciplines such as freestyle and drone racing.

=== Flight controls ===
The radio transmitter allows the operator to manage the drone along four spatial axes using two analog sticks. The most widely adopted configuration globally for FPV drones is "Mode 2", which assigns the controls as follows:

==== Left stick ====
Controls power and horizontal rotation:

- Throttle: Vertical movement (up/down) regulates the power output of the motors. Unlike on stabilized drones, the throttle stick in Acro mode does not automatically return to the center. It is the primary control for managing altitude, counteracting gravity, and determining the aircraft's speed.
- Yaw: Horizontal movement (left/right) controls the drone's rotation around its vertical axis (Z-axis). This allows the aircraft to spin in place.

==== Right stick ====
Controls directional movement and inclination:

- Pitch: Vertical movement tilts the drone forward or backward along its lateral axis (Y-axis). By pitching the nose down, the propellers' thrust is divided into vertical (lift) and horizontal (forward propulsion) force. Pitch dynamics are closely tied to the tilt angle of the onboard FPV camera: the steeper the camera angle faces upward, the more the drone must pitch forward to allow the pilot to keep the horizon in view. Consequently, low camera angles correspond to slower, precision flying, while high camera angles require a much faster and more aggressive flight style.
- Roll: Horizontal movement tilts the drone sideways along its longitudinal axis (X-axis). A coordinated combination of roll (to bank the aircraft) and yaw (to bring the nose around) is required to execute a proper turning maneuver in flight.

=== Telemetry and OSD ===
During flight, the pilot does not maintain visual line-of-sight (VLOS) with the drone, and instead relies on vital telemetry information superimposed on the video feed inside the goggles. This system is known as the OSD (On-Screen Display). The fundamental metrics to monitor include:

- Battery voltage: Indicates the remaining charge of the battery pack (typically LiPo). Constant monitoring prevents over-discharging the cells and sudden motor shutoffs mid-flight.
- Signal strength (RSSI): Standing for Received Signal Strength Indicator, it measures the power of the radio control signal received by the drone.
- Link Quality (LQ): Indicates the integrity of the data packets exchanged between the radio transmitter and the receiver. Together with RSSI, it allows the pilot to determine if the drone is flying out of range or behind physical obstacles, preventing a loss of control and subsequent crash (failsafe).

== Course design ==
MultiGP provides community standards for their races to safely design their own courses and also generates individual pilot competition such as the Global Qualifier which ranks pilots worldwide on standard measured courses. MultiGP gates are the most common gates used for 5" and 7" drone class races.

DRL creates three-dimensional racecourses internationally. The Sci-Fi inspired tracks stretch around a mile-long.

DR1 Racing's Champions Series is an outdoor racing circuit, flying in locations around the world. Each location or race uses a mixture of environmental and manmade elements to create the course. The courses for the 2017 season included the Trona Pinnacles, the Mojave Boneyard at the Mojave Air and Space Port, the DHL Bonn Post Tower, Bunowen Castle in Ireland, Spike Island, and Isle of Man TT. DR1's Micro Series uses indoor locations.

Others such as the U.S. National Drone Racing Championship tend to conduct their races in open areas with less catastrophic obstacles (flags and cones vs. walls and tunnels).

== Major organizations ==
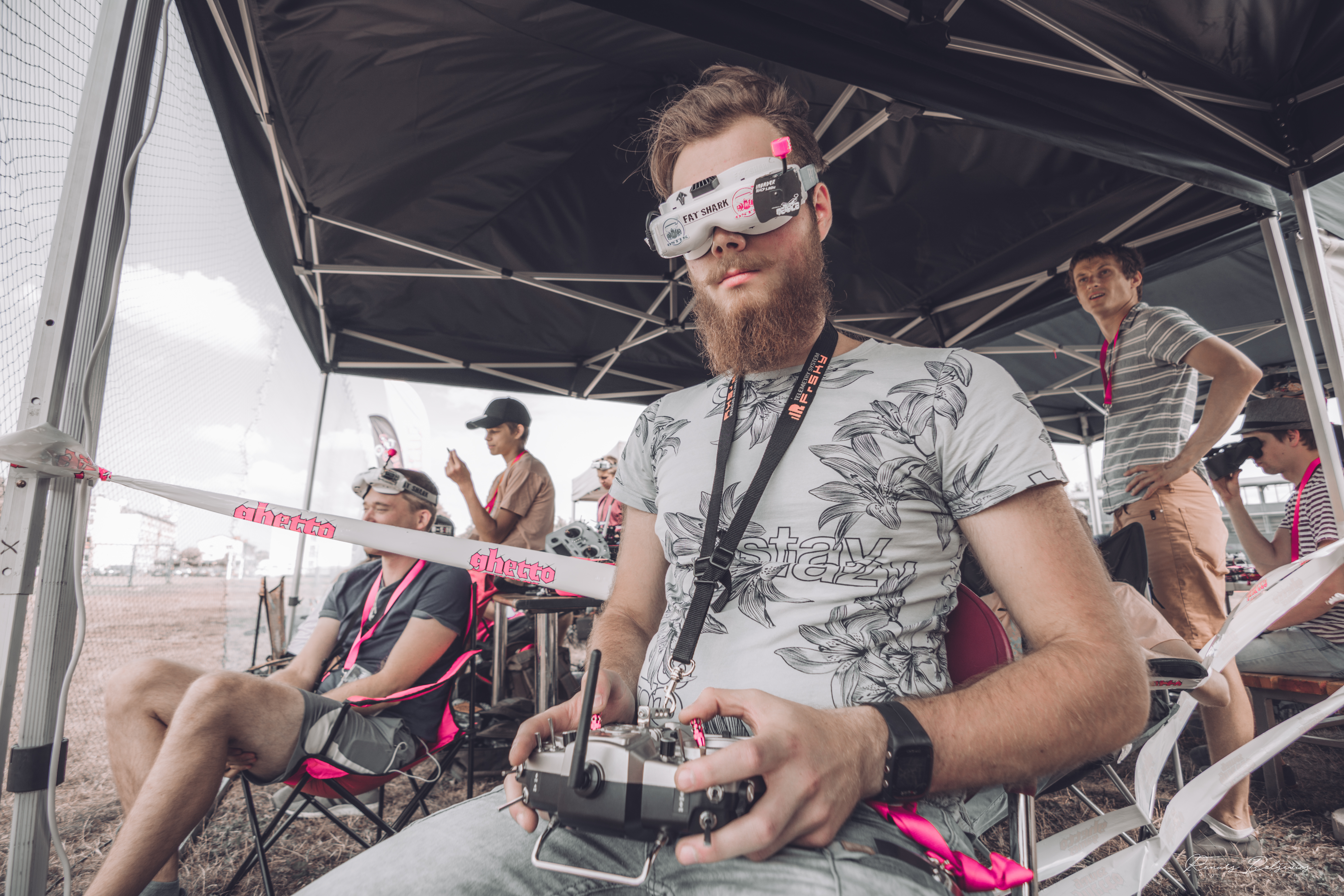
Drone racer piloting a drone

FPV racing organizations create the rules and regulations that govern the sport.

- Fédération Aéronautique Internationale (FAI) – The world governing body for air sports. Recognized by the International Olympic Committee. The Federation coordinates the organization of the FAI Drone Racing World Cup and the FAI World Drone Racing Championship.
- MultiGP – a community based Drone Racing League and the only organization organized by Chapters all around the world. MultiGP governs and sanctions drone racing events internationally. MultiGP is an Official Special Interest Group of the Academy of Model Aeronautics for first-person view racing. The organization is a drone racing league which hosts frequent competition-based tournaments, free-fly gatherings and casual events. The most known corporate events hosted by MultiGP once every year are the MultiGP Championship, MultiGP World Cup and PRO Spec Championship (7inch spec)
- Drone Racing League (DRL) (for profit) – DRL is an invite-only league of drone racing. Pilots participate in several races as part of the DRL's global racing circuit. Some of their races are in real life with real drones, while others are virtual in the DRL Simulator. All pilots race identical, proprietary drones designed and built by the DRL called the Racer 4. DRL is viewable all over the world via YouTube Live and other social media sites.
- Airspeeder is the world's first racing series for manned electric flying cars. Founded and designed by Alauda Aeronautics, who provides competing teams with identical aircraft, known as ‘Speeders’. Teams will then be given the freedom to select drivers and create strategies. Races will take place in remote locations across the globe. The speeders are manned racing electric quadcopters that can fly at speeds of up to 200 km/h. DHL is the series’ global logistics partner, and EQUALS is Airspeeder's FX partner.
- Drone Sports Association (DSA) (for-profit) – The Drone Sports Association (formerly RotorSports) was the oldest drone racing and drone sports organization worldwide.
- International Drone Racing Association (IDRA) (for-profit) – The International Drone Racing Association is a professional racing organization that sanctions and governs multiple drone racing events. They are now inactive since their last event in 2017.
- Drone Champions League] (DCL) (for-profit) – teams with at least four pilots fly in the DCL. The teams at the races are complemented by local wild card teams. 2018 is the 3rd season of the DCL, and three races have been held. The Drone Champions League races are broadcast live.

== Past major events ==
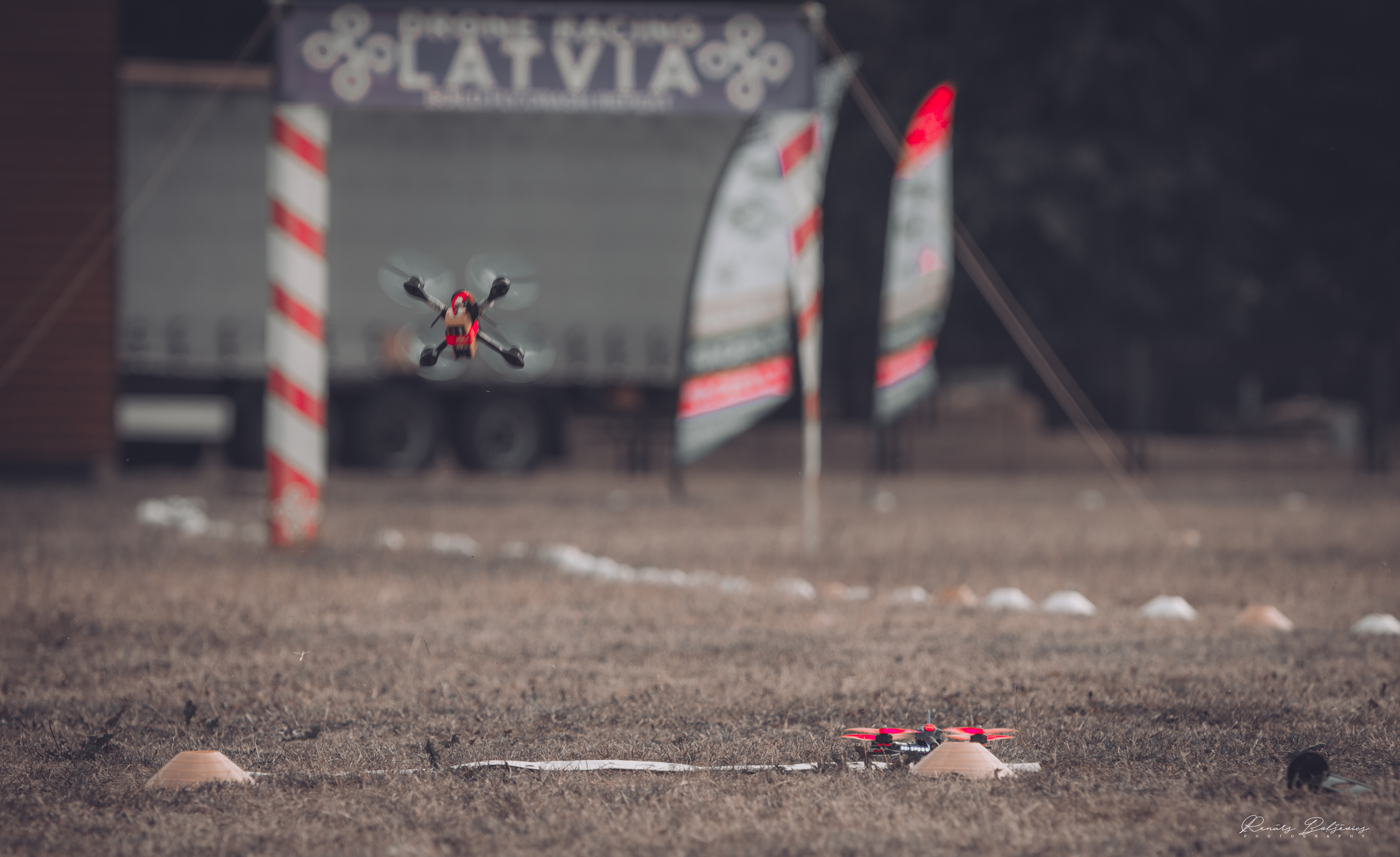
Racing quadcopter flying towards gates and flagpoles in a drone racing event

- 2024 Sharjah Drone Racing Champions hosted by MultiGP was held in Sharjah (UAE) on April 20-21 2024 with sixteen of the fastest FPV drone pilots around the world competing for the first 7inch spec World Title, The race was won by Levi "Leviathann" Johnson. 2nd place went to MCK FPV, third place to BenniUK.
- 2024 MultiGP World Cup hosted by MultiGP was held during the MultiGP International Open, one of the largest FPV Drone Racing event existing, with more than 200 pilots subscribed. Killian Rousseau from France won the title this year.
- 2023 MultiGP Championship took place at No Quarter Ranch, in Citrus Spring, Florida, on October 24-29 2023 with more than 120 pilots participating representing 18 different countries. Minchan "MCK" Kim from South Korea won the championship title for the second year in a row.
- The 2023 FAI Korea Drone Racing World Cup took place from the 18th to the 20th of May 2023 in Incheon, Korea.
- The 2022 FAI Drone Racing World Cup made a come-back. MinJae Kim, a fourteen-year-old junior pilot from South Korea, was the winner.
- 2020 FAI Drone Racing World Championship, was placed on hold due to COVID-19 and no official rankings and awards were given.
- 2019 FAI 2nd Drone Racing World Championship, was held in China at Xiangshan Ningbo. The winner was from South Korea. Changhyeon Kang won over former champion Thomas Bitmatta.
- 2018 FAI 1st Drone Racing World Championship, held in Shenzhen, China. This event was broadcast live across multiple channels, including the Olympic Channel. The race was won by a 17-year-old Australian, with over 128 competitors from 34 countries.
- 2017 DR1 Racing's DHL Champions Series Fueled by Mountain Dew. This team-based drone racing series consisted of 6 races in locations around the world. The Finals of this racing series were held on the Isle of Man TT, and aired on CBS and Eurosport. The broadcast of the Series Finals on CBS drew the largest audience ever for a professional drone race on network television, grabbing a 0.4 share and 559,000 viewers.
- 2016 World Drone Prix, Dubai – World's biggest and most profitable drone race, with a total prize fund of US$1 million.
- 2016 U.S. National Drone Racing Championships Presented by GoPro New York – The second annual event was held August 7 on New York City's Governor's Island. 145 pilots competed in the event for a total prize purse of $57,000.
- 2016 MultiGP National Championships, Indiana – The second annual event was held at the Academy of Model Aeronautics (AMA) headquarters in Muncie, Indiana on September 4, 2016. Over 140 pilots arrived on-site for this Championship event and the $15,000 prize purse.
- 2016 World Drone Racing Championships took place October 20–22 in Kualoa Ranch, Island of Oahu, Hawaii, USA
- In 2016, TOS Asia Cup Shanghai and China Drone National was the largest FPV drone racing event in Asia. Over 140 registered pilots from 15 countries participated.
- The 2016 DR1 Invitational was the most watched drone racing event of the year, airing on Discovery Channel and Eurosport, broadcasting in over 70 countries around the world. The race was held in Sepulveda Dam where pilots navigated through the dam's opening as well as various gates on the course.
- 2015 US Fat Shark National Drone Racing Championships, California – The first annual U.S. National Drone Racing Championships were held in 2015. This event was held in a stadium at the California State Fair. The prize for winning the competition was $25,000 and was competed for by over 100 competitors. Chad Nowak, an Australian, won all three events including the individual time trial, was on the winning team trial squad, and won the freestyle trick event. This gave him the title of 2015 Drone Racing National Champion.

== Events and venues ==
=== United States ===
The U.S. National Drone Racing Championship took place at the 2015 California State Fair. It was a two day event with a $25,000 cash prize that attracted over 120 competitors. This was the first such event in the US; however, other countries such as France, Australia and the UK had previously held similar events. In 2016, the annual MultiGP Championship was held at the Academy of Model Aeronautics' headquarters in Muncie, Indiana where over 120 pilots competed by qualifying through the MultiGP Regional Series, which consists of qualifying events and regional finals in 15 regions across the United States.

MultiGP is a global and professional drone racing league with over 1000 chapters internationally including locations such as Australia, Asia, South Africa and Europe.

=== United Kingdom ===
The British Drone Racing League (BDRL) has recently been set up, and will operate a number of professional events. These events are currently being organised and will follow compliance from the CAA.

== Funding ==
DRL is the only league so far that has established major outside sources of funding. DRL has raised more than $30 million in venture capital backing from entities across the sports, technology, and media spaces. Some notable investors include Sky, Liberty Media (also owners of Formula 1), MGM, CAA, Hearst, WWE, Lux Capital, and RSE Ventures. In addition, DRL has sponsors including Allianz, BMW, the US Air Force, and Swatch. It also has other lines of business, including a licensing deal with Toy State, a toy manufacturing company best known for its Nikko remote control car line. Finally, DRL has content licensing deals with networks around the world, including ESPN and Disney XD in the United States, Sky Sports in the UK, OSN in the Middle East, and Fox Sports in Asia. This funding has been crucial to the development of the league and allows them to advertise and hold their races in better venues that will attract larger crowds.

Other smaller and less established leagues have found it difficult to find funding, often having to use funding from the state and sale of tickets at the event, e.g. the California State Fair. It is also difficult to find venues that create a challenge for the pilots and also have key turns and straightaways. US Army veteran Brett Velicovich has been involved in the launch of drone racing at the Dew Tour. Outside of DRL and DR1, which has Mountain Dew as a sponsor, most smaller events are sponsored by FPV manufacturers such as Fat Shark, ImmersionRC and HobbyKing, DYS, T-Motor, EMAX, Team Black Sheep (TBS).

== Simulators ==
Drone racing can be also simulated on computers via drone flight simulators such as Velocidrone (official MultiGP Simulator), EreaDrone (recognized by the Fédération Aéronautique Internationale), Liftoff, neXt, DRL Simulator, etc. Players can use game controllers such as an Xbox or PlayStation controller; however, some radio controllers support plug and play as well.

== Publications ==
=== Blogs ===
- Ger: Drohnen Blog
- Eng: Drone Operator

=== Magazines ===
- RotorDrone Pro Magazine

=== Podcasts ===
- FPV Podcast Archive (14 Dec. 2019) – The first podcast to cover drone racing, pilots and key people growing the FPV Community.
- Failsafe Weekly Podcast – A podcast run by FPV pilots.
