= Oleksandr Yakovenko (businessman) =

Ukrainian defence-tech manufacturer

- Олександр Яковенко
- Born: December 16, 1989 (age 36); Odesa, Ukraine
- Citizenship: Ukraine
- Occupations: Entrepreneur, philanthropist, volunteer
- Organizations: Enliv UA; TAF Industries; Innovation Hub
- Known for: scaling production of FPV, reconnaissance UAVs, and logistics in Ukraine
- Awards: Order of Merit (Ukraine), 3rd class (2024); Badge "For Assistance" of the National Guard of Ukraine (2022); Honorary badge "For Assistance to the Army" (Order No. 1329) (2022); "For the Defence of Odesa" mayoral decoration (2022); Innovator of the Year (Ukrainska Pravda Awards) (2023); Breakthrough of the Year (Forbes Ukraine) (2024)

Oleksandr Yakovenko (Ukrainian: Олександр Яковенко) is a Ukrainian war-drones manufacturer. He is the founder of the Enliv UA corporate investment fund and the TAF Industries, a producer of FPV loitering munitions, reconnaissance unmanned aerial vehicles (UAVs), interceptor drones, unmanned ground systems (UGS) and electronic-warfare systems. In 2024 he launched a defense-tech cluster to accelerate R&D and investment in military technologies. He has received a number of state and departmental honours, including the Order of Merit in 2024.

== Career ==
In December 2012 Yakovenko founded Supramarin, a trade-logistics operator focused on logistics processes and trade finance. In 2016 he created the Enliv investment fund with projects in international logistics, agri-trade, fuel supply and real estate development.

Since November 2023 he has served as founder and head of the TAF Industries group, which develops and manufactures FPV loitering munitions ("kamikaze" drones), reconnaissance UAVs, interceptor drones and electronic-warfare systems. In 2024 he initiated the Innovation Hub private defence-tech cluster bringing together developers, military personnel and investors to accelerate adoption of new technologies in Ukraine’s defence sector.

In January 2026, Oleksandr Yakovenko transitioned from his role as CEO of TAF Industries to serve as the company's owner and strategist.

On February 13, 2026, TAF Industries and the German company Wingcopter signed a memorandum at the 62nd Munich Security Conference to establish a joint venture in Germany for the large-scale production of reconnaissance UAVs.

In March 2026, Oleksandr Yakovenko launched Gridstone, a company in trade finance and international logistics.

On 14 April 2026, TAF Industries and German C-UAS manufacturer THYRA GmbH signed a Memorandum of Understanding in Berlin, establishing a Ukrainian-German joint venture for the production of UAV interceptors, as part of the Build with Ukraine initiative.

In May 2026, TAF Industries expanded into unmanned ground systems. On 5 May, the company began production of the multipurpose "Legit" UGS, developed in cooperation with Ukraine's Defence Intelligence (HUR). On 20 May, it acquired a majority stake in the "Teslya" UGS, purchasing shares from the founder of manufacturer Phantom Technology and from the Resist.UA fund, which had been the platform's main investor since 2024.

== Public and charitable activity ==
Since 2022 Yakovenko has been associated with the charitable foundation Khvylia ’91, which supports Ukrainian military units with equipment and assistance. More than 120 entrepreneurs and companies joined the programme, with assistance to over 200 brigades totalling about ₴375 million.

== Awards and honours ==
Yakovenko has received the Order of Merit (3rd class) in 2024, the Medal "For Assistance to the Armed Forces of Ukraine", the Medal "For Assistance to Defence", the National Guard's Badge "For Assistance", the award weapon of the Defence Intelligence of Ukraine (2022), and municipal and media distinctions such as For the Defence of Odesa (2022), Innovator of the Year (Ukrainska Pravda, 2023) and Breakthrough of the Year (Forbes Ukraine, 2024).

On 17 April 2026, Oleksandr Yakovenko, founder of TAF Industries, was named EY Entrepreneur of the Year 2026 in Ukraine.
