= Drone Racing League =

Air sports league

- Sport: Drone racing
- Category: Air sports
- Abbreviation: DRL
- Founded: 2015
- Location: United States

Official website
- thedroneracingleague.com

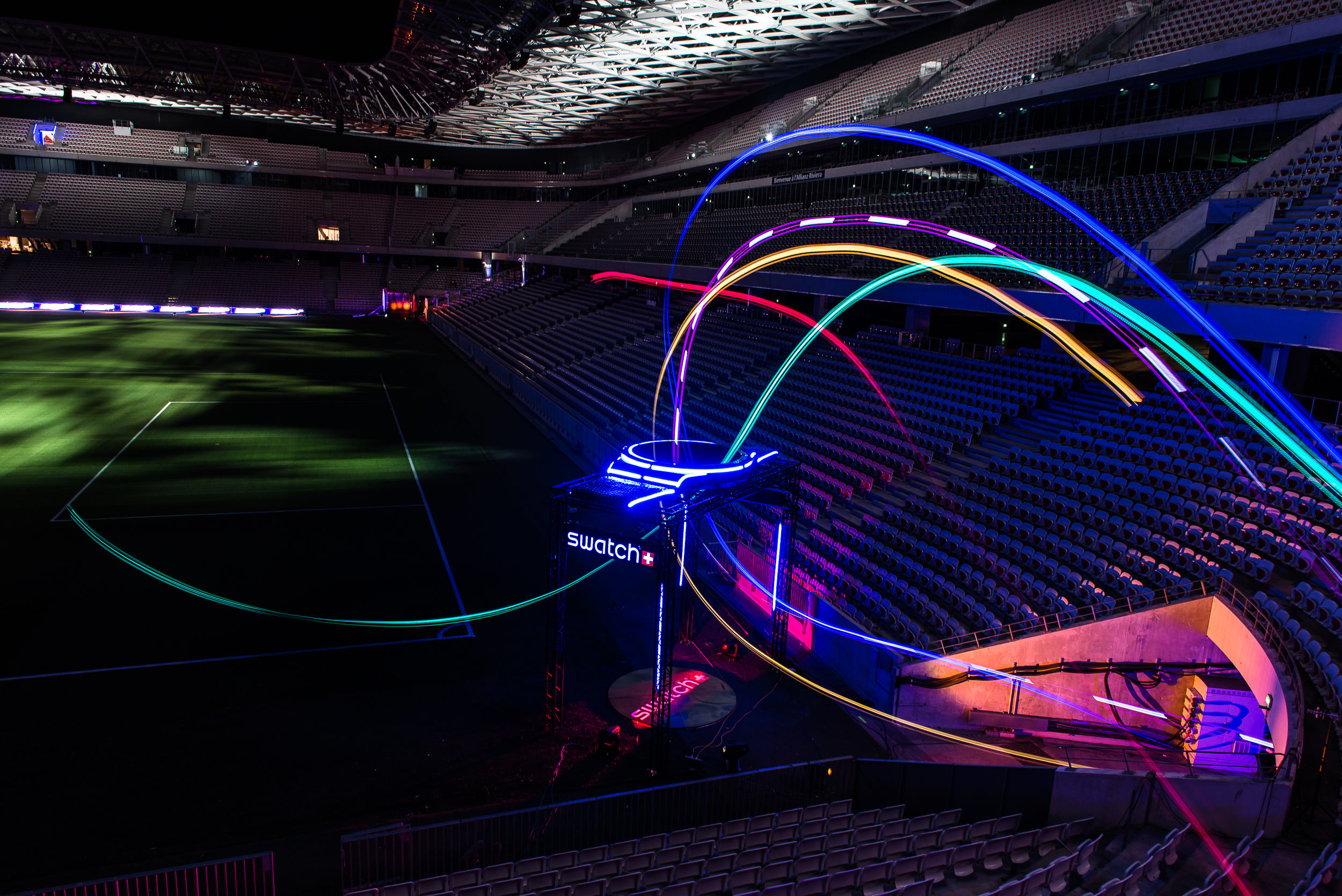
DRL drones race through the Swatch gate during Level 5: Allianz Riviera in the 2018 DRL Allianz World Championship Season.

The Drone Racing League (DRL) was a professional drone racing league that operated internationally. DRL pilots race in first person view with identical, custom-built drones at speeds above 80 mph through three-dimensional courses. News publication Quartz described DRL as feeling "like from Star Wars" with "hopes [of becoming] the Formula One, NASCAR and MotoGP of drone racing."

Founded in 2015 and launched publicly in January 2016, DRL is broadcast on Twitter, NBC, NBC Sports, Sky Sports, ProSiebenSat.1, FOX Sports Asia, Groupe AB, and OSN. Former broadcast partners include ESPN and Disney XD.

In 2018, DRL launched the Artificial Intelligence Robotic Racing (AIRR) Circuit, an autonomous drone racing series. It invited teams of university students and technologists to design an AI framework capable of flying a drone through DRL courses without human intervention and compete for a chance to win $1,000,000 in prizes.

DRL is no longer active following indefinite postponement of a planned 2025 event. As part of liquidation of the racing league, in 2026 DRL assets were auctioned including Racer4 drones.

== History ==
DRL CEO and founder Nicholas Horbaczewski started the league in 2015 after serving as the chief revenue officer of Tough Mudder. Horbaczewski purchased a company called DroneKraft to develop an internal technology department.

Horbaczewski partnered with Ryan Gury, who designed and built the league's drones and serves as its director of product. Early investors included Miami Dolphins owner Stephen Ross.

In September 2016, DRL announced global media distribution agreements with ESPN, Sky and ProSieben, and a close of $12mm in Series A funding, led by RSE Ventures and Lux Capital. Other investors included MGM Television, CAA Ventures, Hearst Ventures, Lerer Hippeau Ventures, Courtside Ventures and Strauss Zelnick.

In February 2017, DRL announced global insurance company, Allianz, as the title sponsor of their international race circuit, the DRL Allianz World Championship Season.

That summer, DRL announced additional brand partners including Amazon Prime Video, BMW, Swatch, and the U.S. Air Force, expanded media partnerships with OSN, Disney XD, and FOX Sports Asia, as well as a close of $20,000,000 of Series B funding, adding new stakeholders including WWE, Allianz, Sky, Liberty Media and CRCM Ventures.

In 2018, DRL announced new sponsorship agreements with Lockheed Martin and Cox Communications, as well as extended relationships with Allianz, BMW, the U.S. Air Force, and Fatshark.

In 2019, DRL signs a new U.S. broadcast deal with NBC Sports and will planned to carry 44 hours of coverage on NBCSN and the NBC broadcast network.

In January 2021, DRL officially announced that DraftKings would be awarded the official betting partner label. This enables the company to gain betting and marketing advantages in its league. DRL also announced new sponsorship agreements with T-Mobile, Algorand and Draganfly. Ahead of the start of the 2021–22 season, it was announced that NBCSN would shut down at the end of 2021, with the date of December 31 as the actual date; the DRL announced that the remainder of the 2021–22 season would move to the NBC network following the closure of NBCSN.

== Technology ==
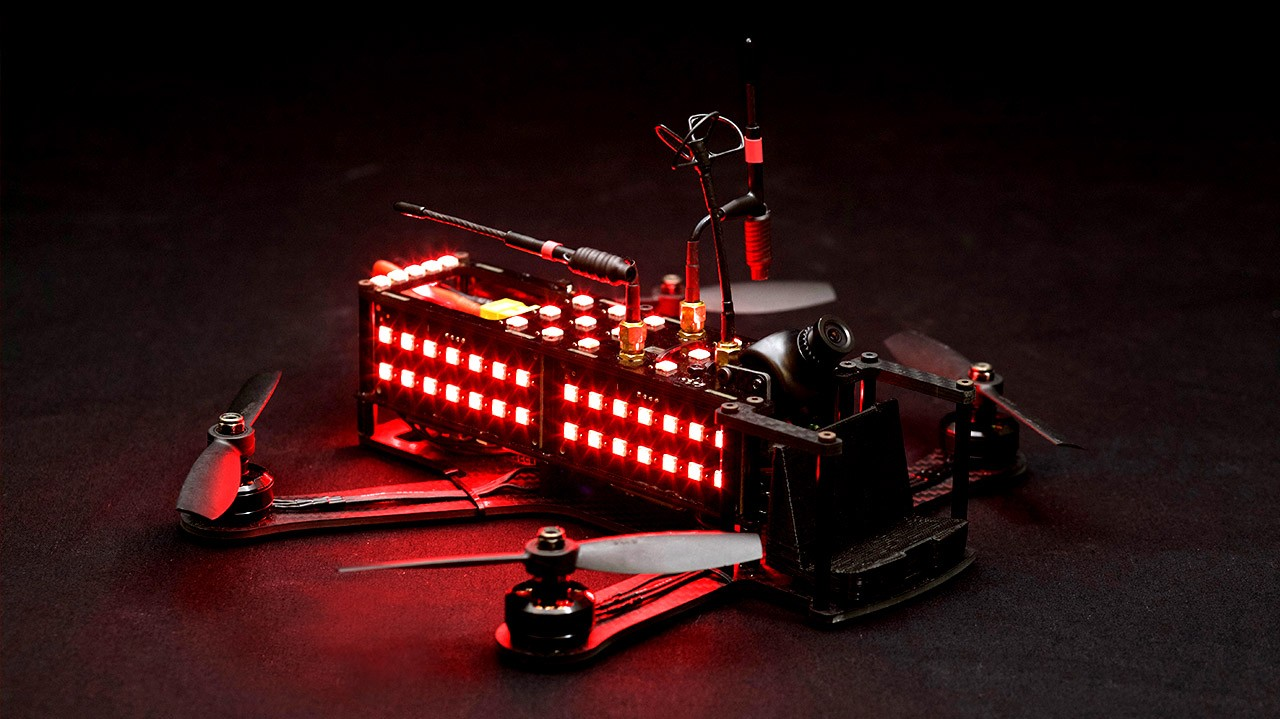
Racer2

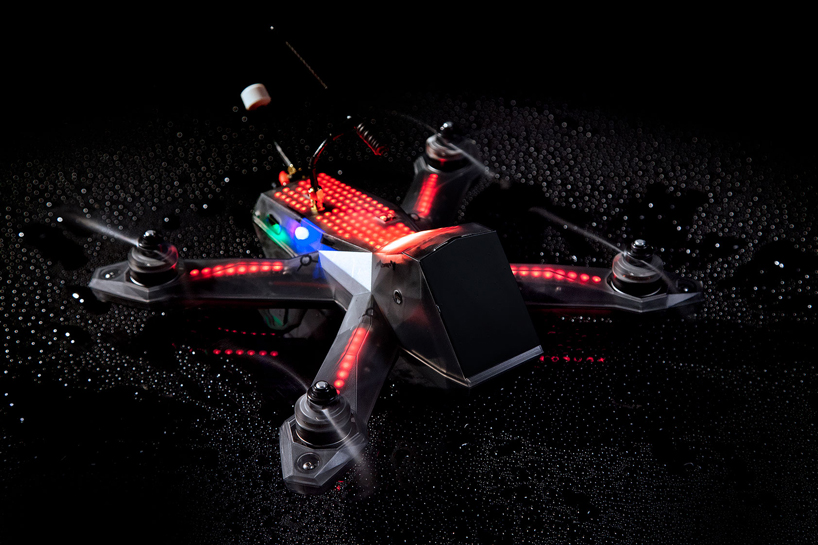
Racer3

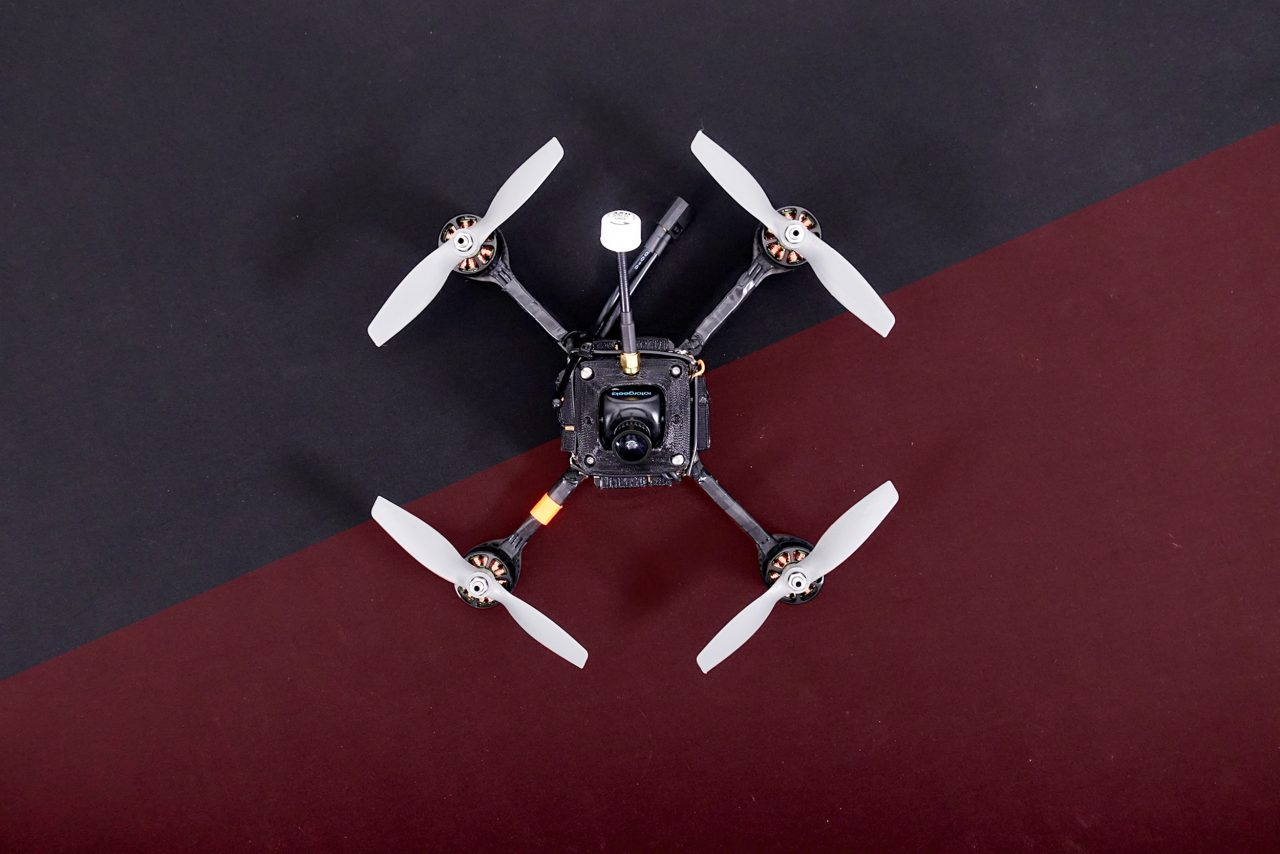
RacerX

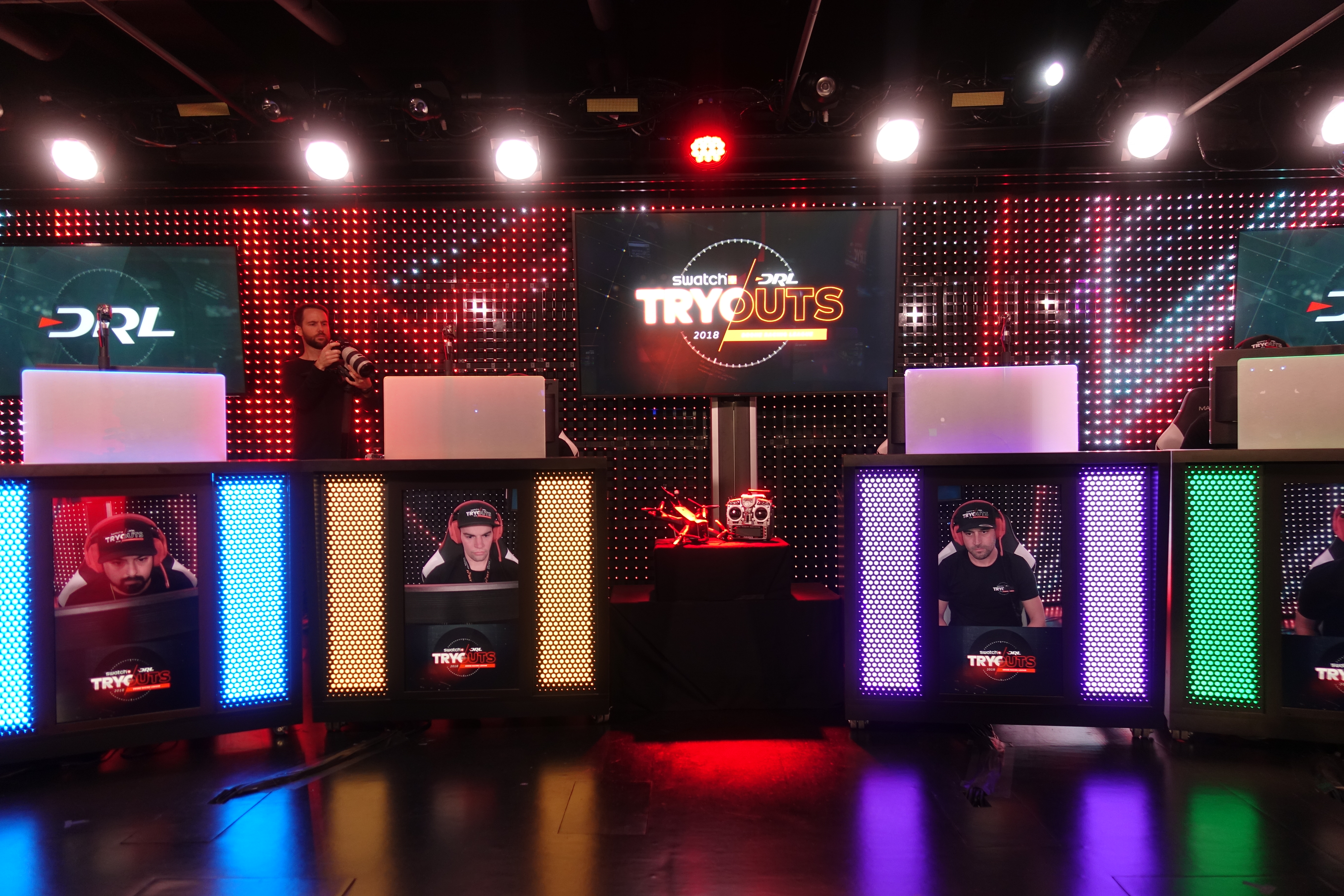
2018 Swatch DRL Tryouts at Microsoft Studios on Fifth Avenue in NYC

Horbaczewski claims that at its core, DRL is a technology company. DRL's expert engineers hand-built a fleet of identical racing drones, developed a proprietary radio system to enable DRL drones to race through large scale courses through eight feet of concrete, and created a realistic drone racing sim, the DRL Simulator.

According to Horbaczewski, DRL "develop[s] all of our drones in-house" in order to "create a level playing field" for races. For Horbaczewski, "it was important to make sure that when you saw a pilot win a race, you knew that was the best pilot, not necessarily the person flying a faster drone."

All DRL drones are identical in spec, but are covered in hundreds of ultra-bright LEDs to help viewers easily follow the action. As described by Wired, the LED rigs also "lend a Tron-like aesthetic to the races."

Built for speed rather than stability, DRL drones differ from commercial drones. Beginning in 2020, a variant of the latest model flown by DRL pilots will be available to the public.

Since its launch, DRL pilots have flown three types of drones: the Racer2 in 2016, the Racer3 in 2017–2018, and the Racer4 beginning in 2019.

=== Racer2 ===
In 2016, DRL traveled with a fleet of 100 Racer2 drones to its races. The Racer2 had two or three minutes of battery life, topping out at 80 mph. The drone weighed slightly heavier than a normal racing drone due to the LED lights covering each craft, needed for visibility and pilot identification.

Racer2 drones also had exposed electronics that made them more susceptible to damage from crashes.

=== Racer3 ===
In 2017, DRL introduced the Racer3 drone, flown by DRL pilots throughout the 2017 and 2018 DRL Allianz World Championship Seasons. The Racer3 is more powerful and agile than the Racer2 and can accelerate from 0 to 80 mph in less than a second and fly as high as 6-8 kilometers.

The Racer3 has 16 pounds of thrust (~7:1 thrust as it weight ~1 kg, good fpv quads are ~12:1) with a top speed of around 90 mph.

Unlike the Racer2, the Racer3 has a hard shell or canopy to protect it from crashes.

DRL brought a fleet of identical 600 Racer3 drones to every race in 2018.

=== RacerX ===
In July 2017, Ryan Gury and his team of drone engineers designed and hand built the DRL RacerX, the former Guinness World Record holder for the Fastest Ground Speed by a Battery-powered Remote-controlled Quadcopter. Weighing less than two pounds, the RacerX hit a top speed of 179.6 miles per hour, the official speed was recorded as 163.5 miles per hour.

Earlier prototypes of the RacerX burst into flames when hitting its peak acceleration due to the amount of power it used.

=== Racer4 ===
In the 4th season, DRL introduced the all new Racer4 drone. While visually similar to the Racer3, the Racer 4 boasts larger props at the expense of added weight.

=== DRL Simulator ===
To broaden the accessibility of drone racing, DRL created the DRL Simulator, which helps pilots fly FPV better in real life, and is downloadable on Steam. The sim features a 50-mission tutorial to help teach aspiring pilots how to fly before buying a real drone. Once in-game, pilots can fly real drones on real DRL race maps that they have seen on television.

The league holds an annual live esports tournament on the DRL Sim called the Swatch DRL Tryouts, which transform gamers into pro pilots overnight. The winner of the competition earns a spot as the official Swatch Pilot in The Drone Racing League with a $75,000 professional contract. Recent pilot recruits from the Tryouts include Jacob "Jawz" Schneider and Emmanuel "UFO" Mota.

== Seasons ==
=== 2016 season ===
DRL launched its first season in January 2016 and hosted five professional races. Races took place across the country at venues such as the Miami Dolphins NFL HardRock Stadium, the abandoned Hawthorne Mall in Los Angeles, a laboratory in New York, a paper mill in Hamilton, Ohio and an auto plant in Detroit.

In its first season DRL was broadcast in over 40 countries, on SkySports, ESPN and ProsiebenSat.1, and over 75 million fans tuned in to watch DRL races and content, either online or on TV.

Sixteen pilots competed in the 2016 Season, and Jordan "Jet" Temkin from Fort Collins, Colorado won the inaugural Championship, earning a $100,000 contract to become the first professional drone pilot. Jet's victory earned him an automatic place in DRL's 2017 season.

=== 2017 season ===
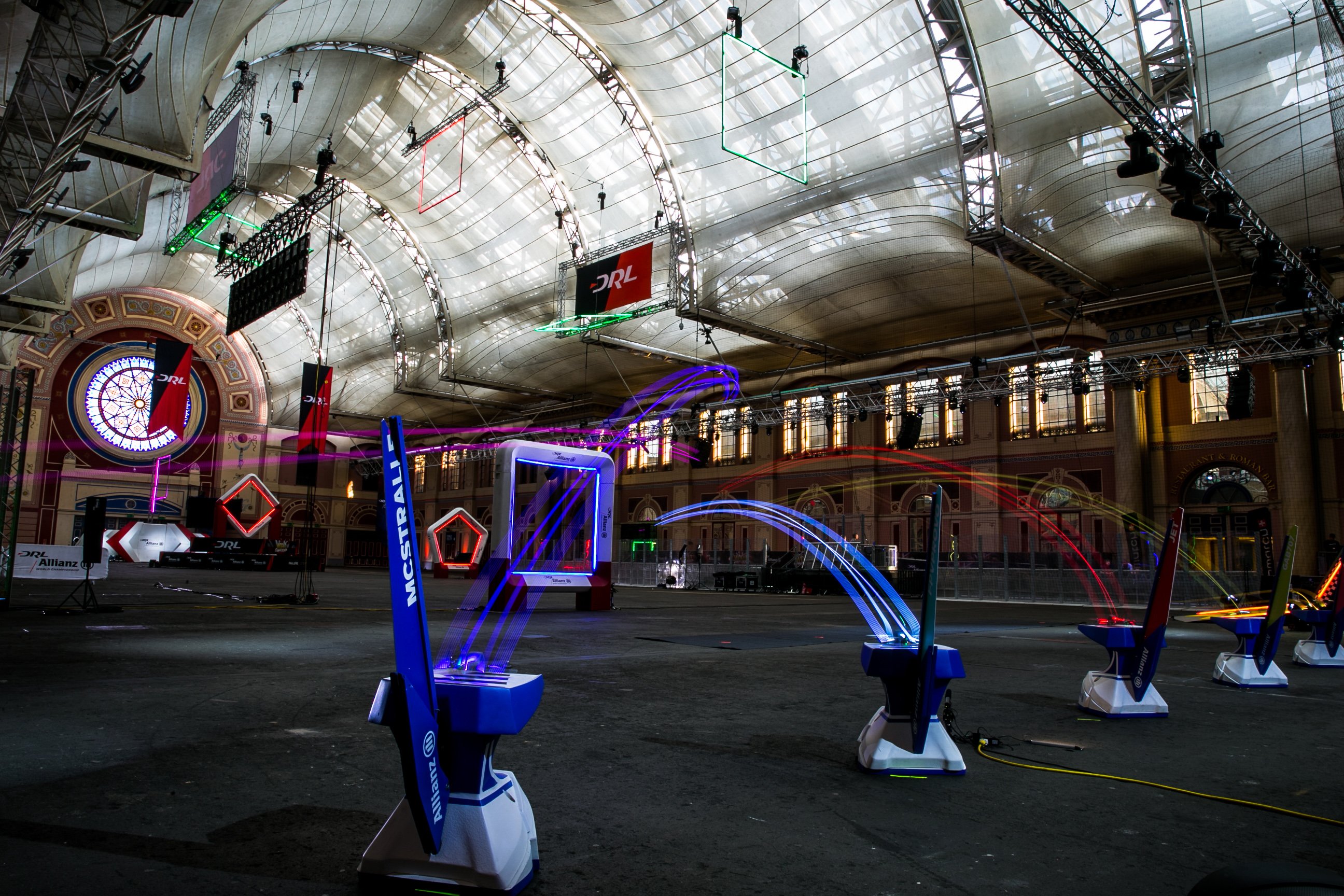
2017 DRL Allianz World Championship Race at Alexandra Palace in London

The league's 2017 television season kicked off on June 20 on ESPN and was broadcast in more than 75 countries with additional broadcast partners including Sky Sports, ProSiebenSat.1, Disney XD and OSN. The 2017 season included 16 hours of DRL original content.

Races in 2017 took place at the Miami Dolphins NFL Sunlife Stadium, an emergency response and disaster training center in Atlanta, a float storage warehouse in New Orleans, a paper mill in Boston (located in Fitchburg, MA), an abandoned motorcycle factory in Munich and in London's iconic Alexandra Palace. The Allianz World Championship held at Alexandra Palace became the first drone racing event to have featured betting markets at Paddy Power Betfair. Players could place bets on individual heat winners and the grand champion via the Betfair Sportsbook mobile app.

Defending champion Jet beat out fellow pilot Gab707 in the last heat of the final, claiming the title of the world's fastest drone racer for a second year in a row.

=== 2018 season ===
Dunkan became the first DRL pilot to win three levels in a single season and the only pilot to win three levels consecutively.

Jet's run as DRL's only champion (having won both the 2016 and 2017 seasons) ended when he failed to accumulate enough points during the 2018 DRL World Championship Finals.

Paul "Nurk" Nurkkala, reaching his first World Championship Finals, beat fellow pilot Gab707 and rookie pilot Nubb to win the Golden Heat and clinch the 2018 DRL World Championship title.

=== 2019 season ===
In his breakout season, rookie Alex Vanover took the World Championship title in Phoenix, Arizona. He secured enough seasonal points to clinch the world championship title with three levels wins before the end of the season.

The season started at Hard Rock Stadium in Miami Florida, where Vanover took his first level win at his debut DRL race. 2018 world champion Nurk would go on to win level two.

At Allianz Field in St. Paul Minnesota, Vanover would take his second level win of the season, winning level three. In level four, Gab707 would take the win.

At Chase Field in Phoenix Arizona, 2018 runner up Nubb took the level five win, in front of the first live audience DRL race in the United States. Vanover would come back to win level six, with enough points to clinch the 2019 season.

=== 2020 season ===
The 2020 season was cancelled because of the COVID-19 pandemic, and instead they planned a fundraising tournament called the 2020 FanDuel DRL SIM Racing Cup, to raise funds for DirectRelief's COVID-19 relief efforts.

== Format and broadcasting ==
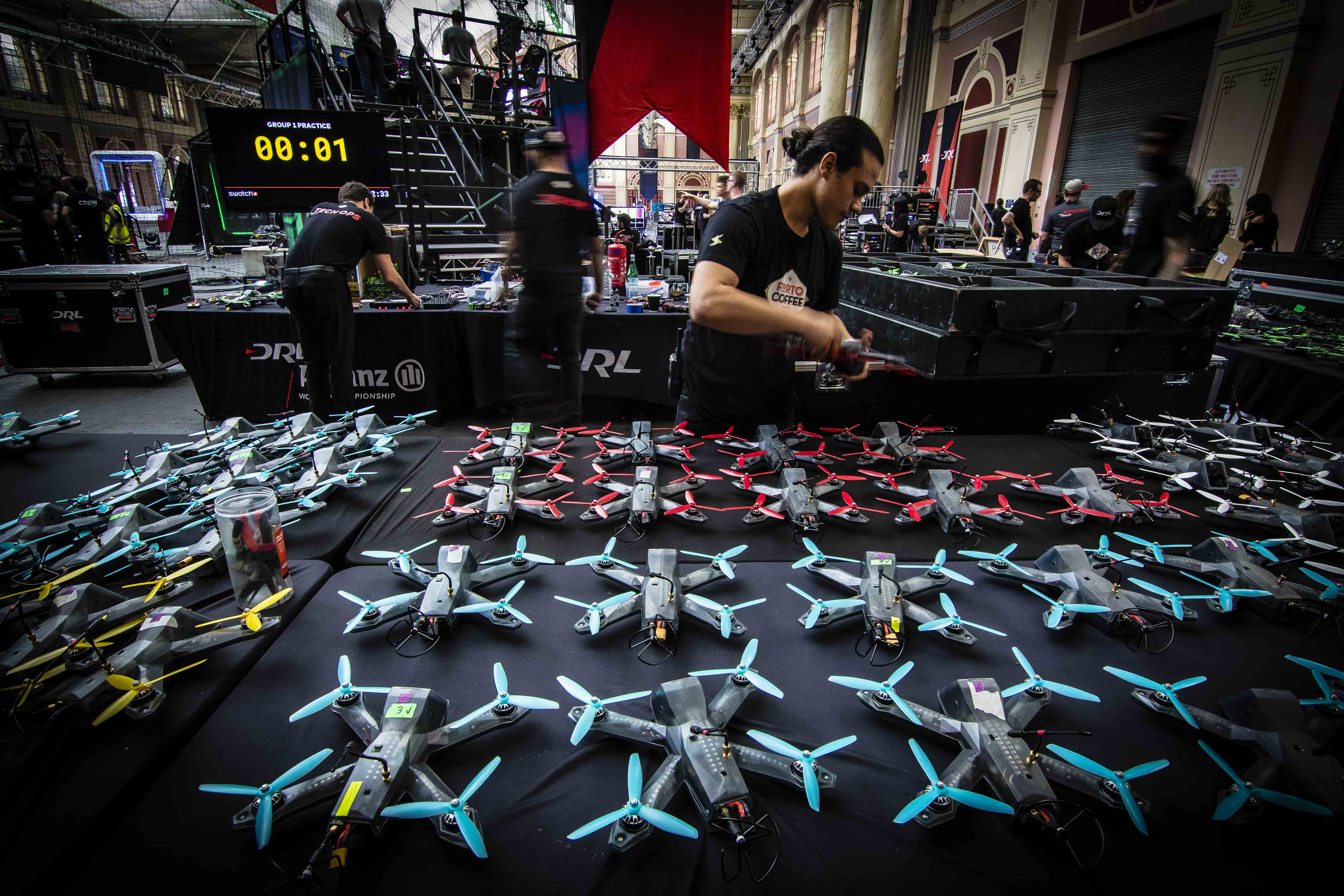
DRL engineers repairing DRL Racer3 drones

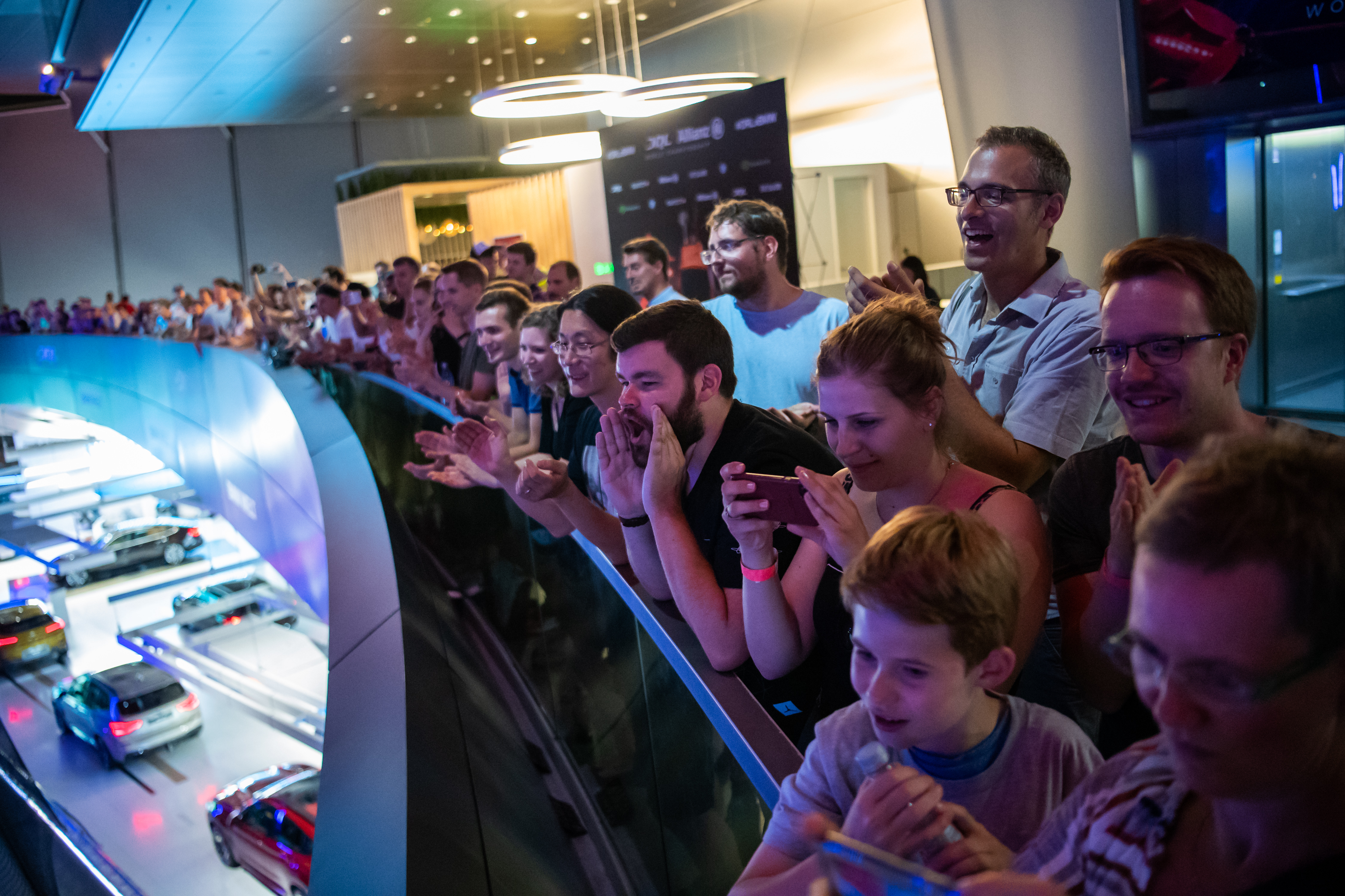
DRL fans cheering during the 2018 DRL Allianz World Championship Season's Level 6: BMW Welt in Munich, Germany

DRL recruits drone pilots from around the globe to compete on original courses. Two groups of six pilots compete during separate rounds of semifinals, and the fastest three pilots from each group move on to the finals. The semifinals and finals races each include multiple heats that each last about a minute long. Pilots are awarded points based on their placement in each heat and the fastest pilot with the most points at the end wins the race, earning a guaranteed spot in the World Championship finale.

DRL films all of its races for a broadcast and digital audience. In order to capture racing quad-copters that fly almost 90 mph, DRL designs and manages the entire drone racing and broadcast ecosystem for its events, including the timing and length of races.

The DRL media team uses 50 to 60 cameras per event and the drone itself has two cameras: an SD low latency analogue HS1177 600TVL for pilot navigation and a GoPro Session 5 for post-production, both of which operate automatically with no remote controls.

The races are not broadcast live; they are post-produced for broadcast.

== Recognition ==
- Fast Company named DRL as one of its Most Innovative Companies and the third Most Innovative Sports Company in 2017, ranking it along the likes of Amazon, Google and Apple.
- Listed by Ad Age as the 2017 "Startup to Watch".
- Cynopsis Sports Media named DRL the Most Innovative in Sports Production in 2017
- The Edison Awards recognized DRL as the Best in Tech Games in 2018
- Sports Technology Awards named DRL as the Best Esport of 2018

== See also ==
- Drones
- First-person view (radio control)
- Radio-controlled aircraft
