= Alexander Yakovenko =

Alexander Yakovenko (Russian: Александр Яковенко) or Oleksander Yakovenko (Ukrainian: Олександр Яковенко) may refer to:

- Alexander Yakovenko (diplomat) (born 1954), Russian diplomat
- Oleksandr Yakovenko (footballer) (born 1987), Ukrainian footballer
- Oleksandr Yakovenko (lieutenant colonel), Ukrainian soldier
- Oleksandr Yakovenko (businessman), Ukrainian war-drones manufacturer
