= Dmytro Yakovenko =

Dmytro Yakovenko may refer to:

- Dmytro Yakovenko (athlete) (born 1992), Ukrainian high jumper
- Dmytro Yakovenko (footballer) (born 1971), Ukrainian football player
