= HobbyKing =

Hong Kong sales site

- Company type: Private
- Industry: Model aircraft, naval Models
- Founded: April 1, 2001
- Founder: Karen Wu and Anthony Hand
- Headquarters: Kwun Tong, Hong Kong
- Products: Bixler 1.1, KK 2.0, Turnigy Nano-Tech, Moteurs SK3
- Website: hobbyking.com

HobbyKing is a Hong Kong–based sales site that mainly distributes products dedicated to model airplanes and remote controlled (RC) models.

== History ==
The company was founded in 2001 in Hong Kong by Karen Wu and Anthony Hand. The company targets the market with low-cost equipment for the models it sells.

HobbyKing, today, contributes to activities of the major players in the world of modeling part from young beginners.

The company opened gradually to local markets through the opening of regional warehouses, today it consists of seven warehouses in Hong Kong, Australia, United States, Netherlands, United Kingdom and China.

On June 5, 2018, the Federal Communications Commission proposed a $2.8 million fine for marketing devices that utilized unauthorized radio spectrum.

In January 2019, the HobbyKing Board of Directors named Toby Osmond as CEO. On July 23, 2020, The FCC issued a forfeiture order to HobbyKing legally requiring them to pay the $2.8 million fine.

As of 2024, there are four warehouses still open; the ones in Europe, Hong Kong, the United Kingdom, and United States. On September 15, 2023, the UK warehouse was announced its reopening, joining the European warehouse that had reopened a month prior.
