= First-person view (remote control) =

Controlling a radio-controlled vehicle from the driver or pilot's view point

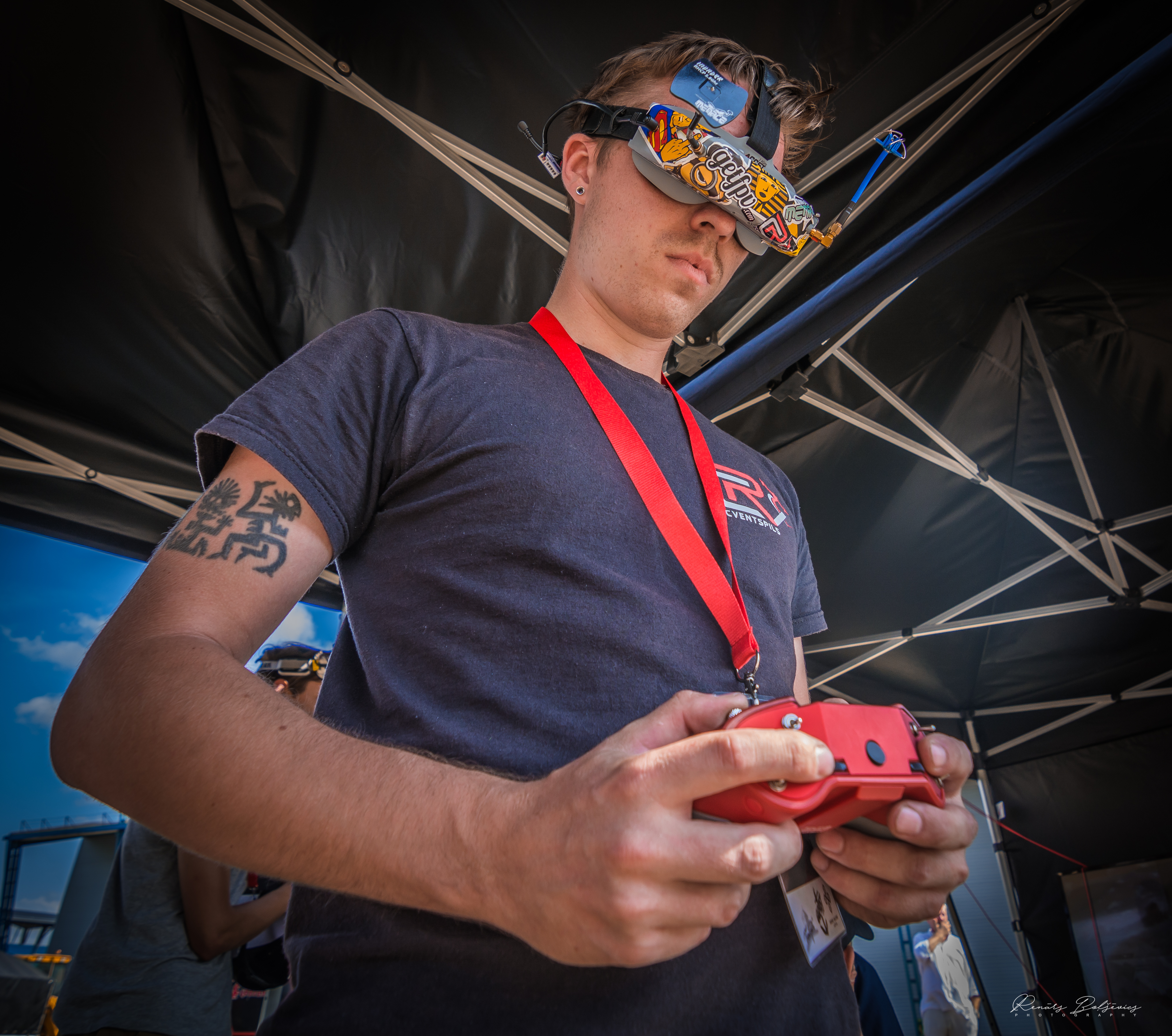
Drone racer wearing FPV goggles and holding a radio controller

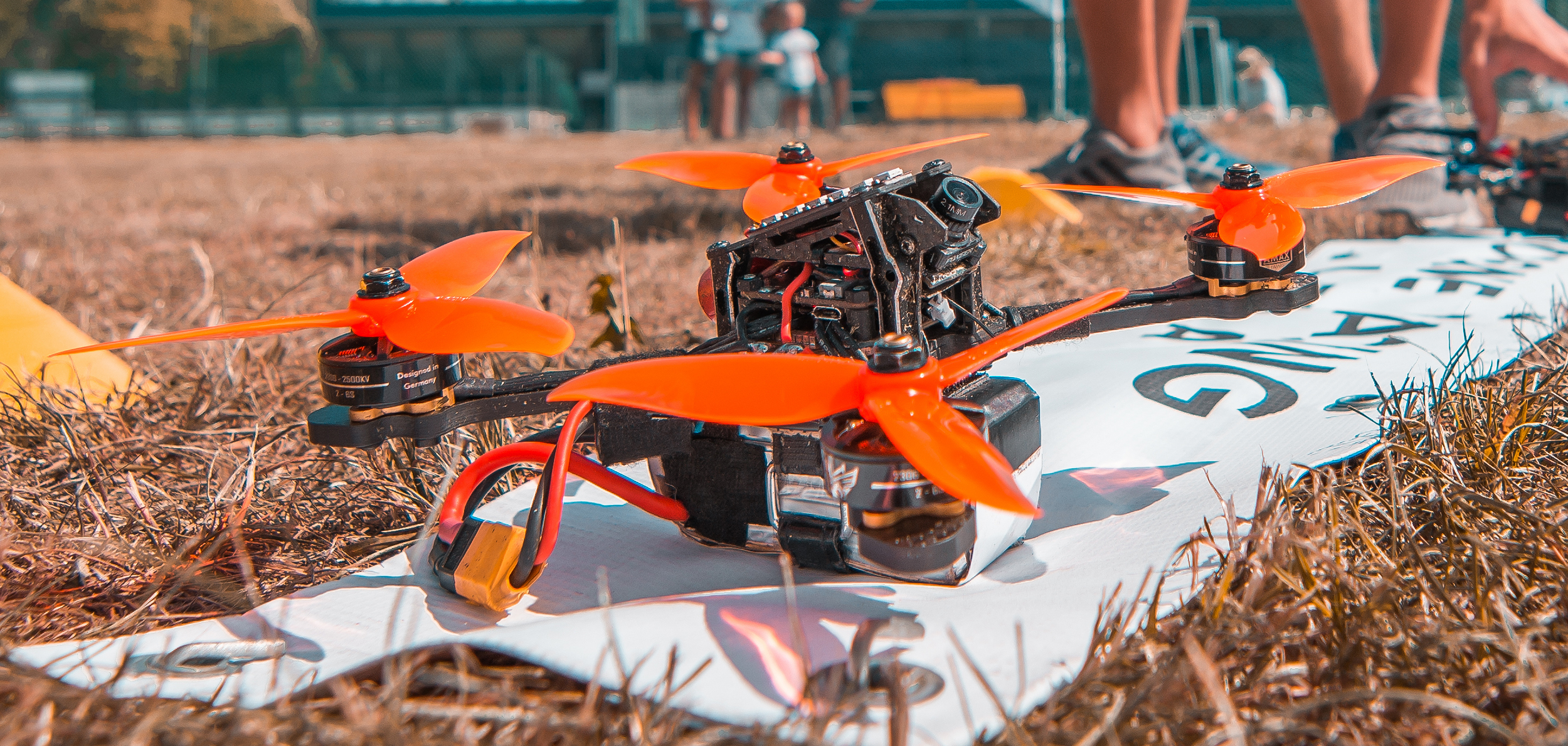
Close-up of a racing drone 2018

First-person view (FPV), also known as remote-person view (RPV), or video piloting, is a method used to control a remote-controlled vehicle from the driver or pilot's viewpoint. Most commonly it is used to pilot a radio-controlled aircraft or other type of unmanned aerial vehicle (UAV) such as a military drone. The operator gets a first-person perspective from an onboard camera that feeds video to FPV goggles or a monitor. More sophisticated setups include a pan-and-tilt gimbaled camera controlled by a gyroscope sensor in the pilot's goggles and with dual onboard cameras, enabling a true stereoscopic view.

== Airborne FPV ==
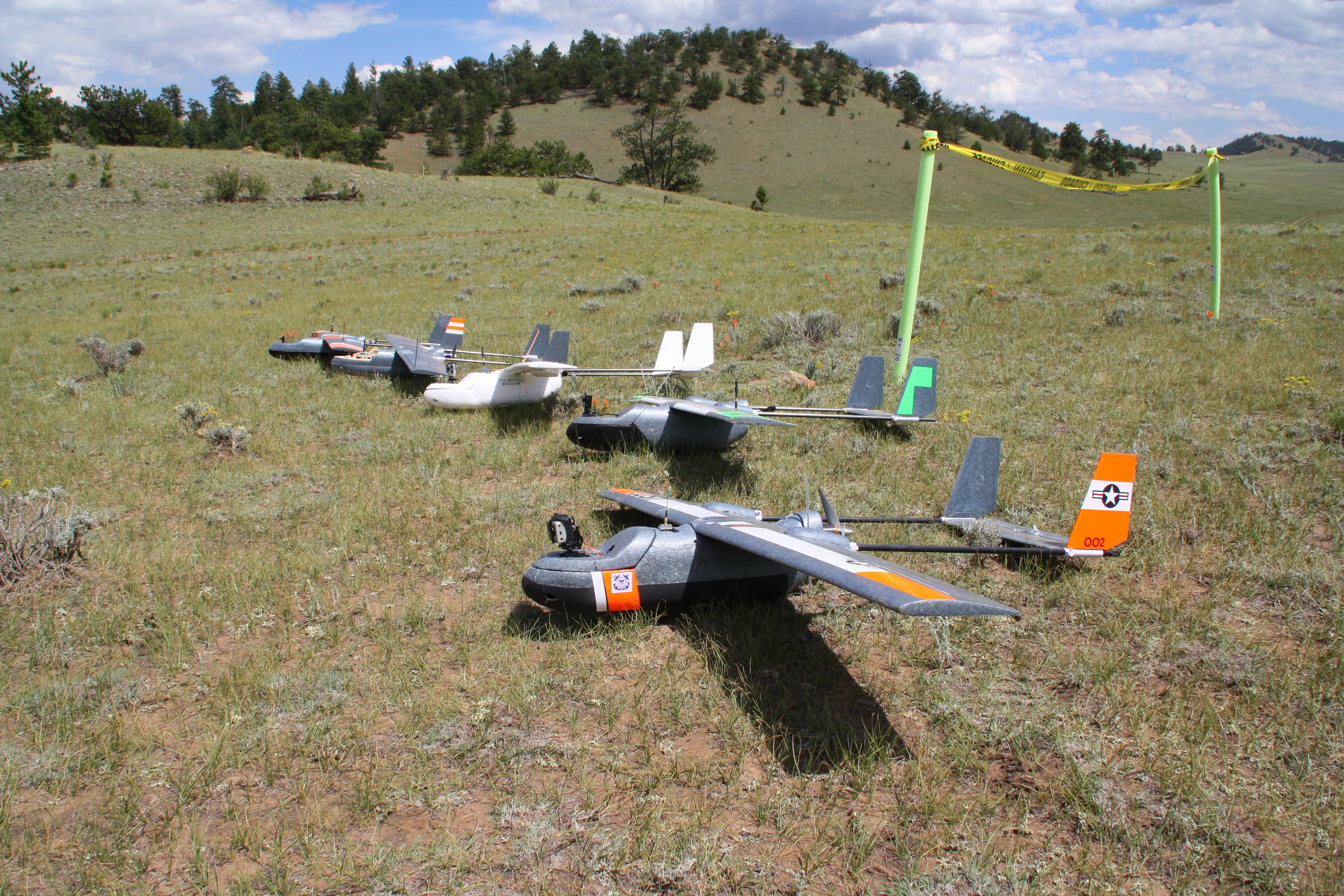
An assortment of FPV aircraft of the popular "Sky Hunter" design at an FPV meetup in Colorado in July 2013

Airborne FPV is a type of remote-control (RC) flying that has grown in popularity in recent years. It involves mounting a small video camera and an analogue video transmitter to an RC aircraft and flying by means of a live video down-link, commonly displayed on video goggles or a portable monitor. FPV became increasingly common throughout the late 2000s and early 2010s. It is currently one of the fastest growing activities involving RC aircraft, and has given rise to a small but growing industry providing products specifically designed for FPV use. FPV aircraft are frequently used for aerial photography and videography, and many videos of FPV flights can be found on popular video sites such as YouTube and Vimeo. For this purpose, many FPV pilots utilize a second, lightweight high-definition on-board camcorder in addition to their standard-definition video link(s).

A 2021 movie Red Notice became one of the first Hollywood feature films to extensively utilize an FPV drone for cinematography.

=== Equipment ===
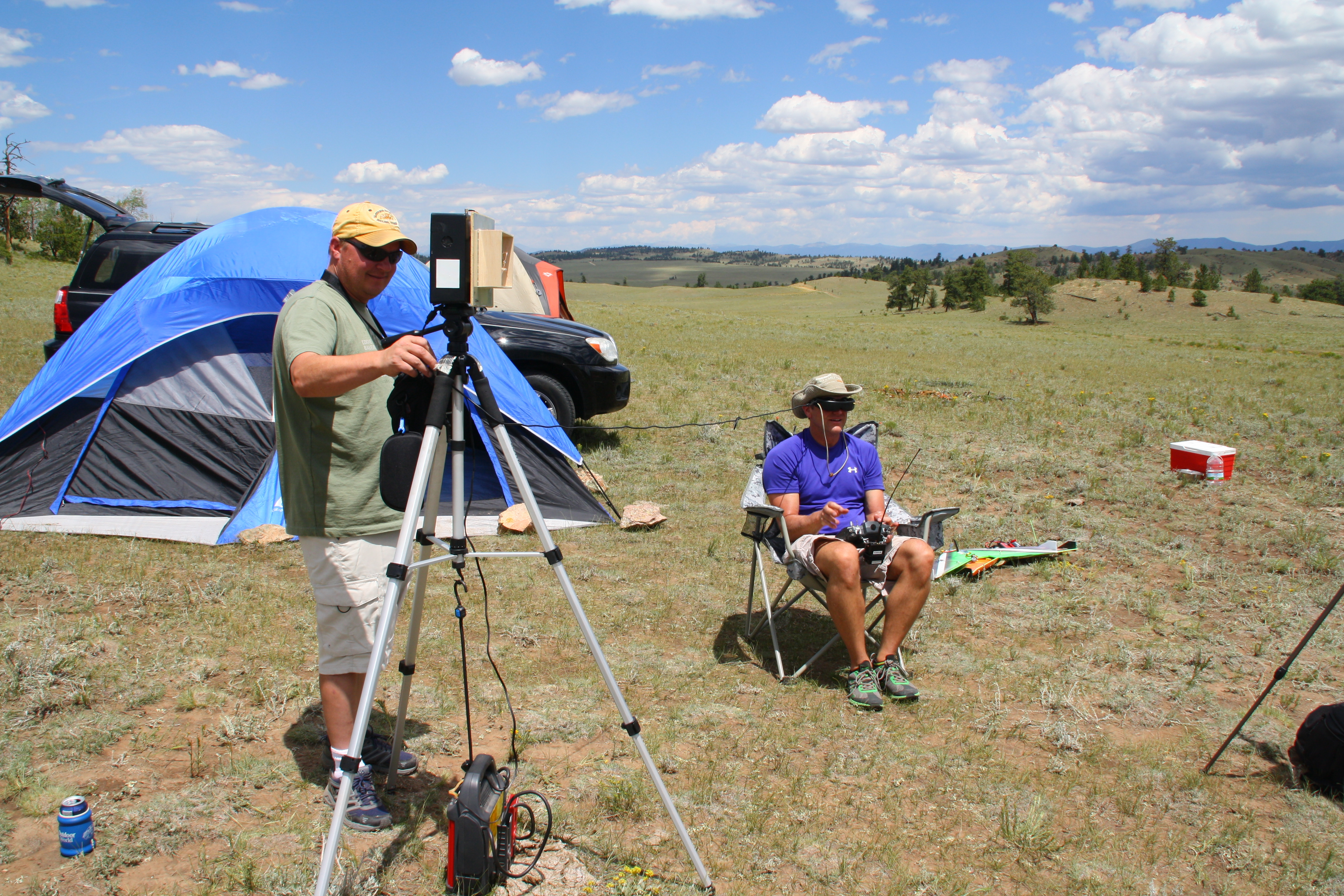
A FPV pilot flies his aircraft using video goggles while a spotter aims a directional antenna at the plane.

There are two primary components of a FPV setup: the airborne component and the ground component (typically called a ground station). A basic FPV system consists of a camera and an analogue video transmitter on the aircraft with a video receiver and a display on the ground. More advanced setups commonly add in specialized hardware, including on-screen displays with GPS navigation and flight data, stabilization systems, and autopilot devices with "return to home" capability—allowing the aircraft to fly back to its starting point autonomously in the event of a signal loss. Another common feature is the addition of pan and tilt capability to the camera, provided by servos. This, when coupled with video goggles and "head tracking" devices creates a truly immersive, first-person experience, as if the pilot was actually sitting in the cockpit of the RC aircraft. Receiving equipment—commonly referred to as the "Ground Station"—generally consists of an analog video receiver (matching the frequency of the transmitter on board the aircraft) and a viewing device. More complex Ground Stations often include a means to record the received image along with more sophisticated antennas for achieving greater range and clarity.

=== Aircraft types ===
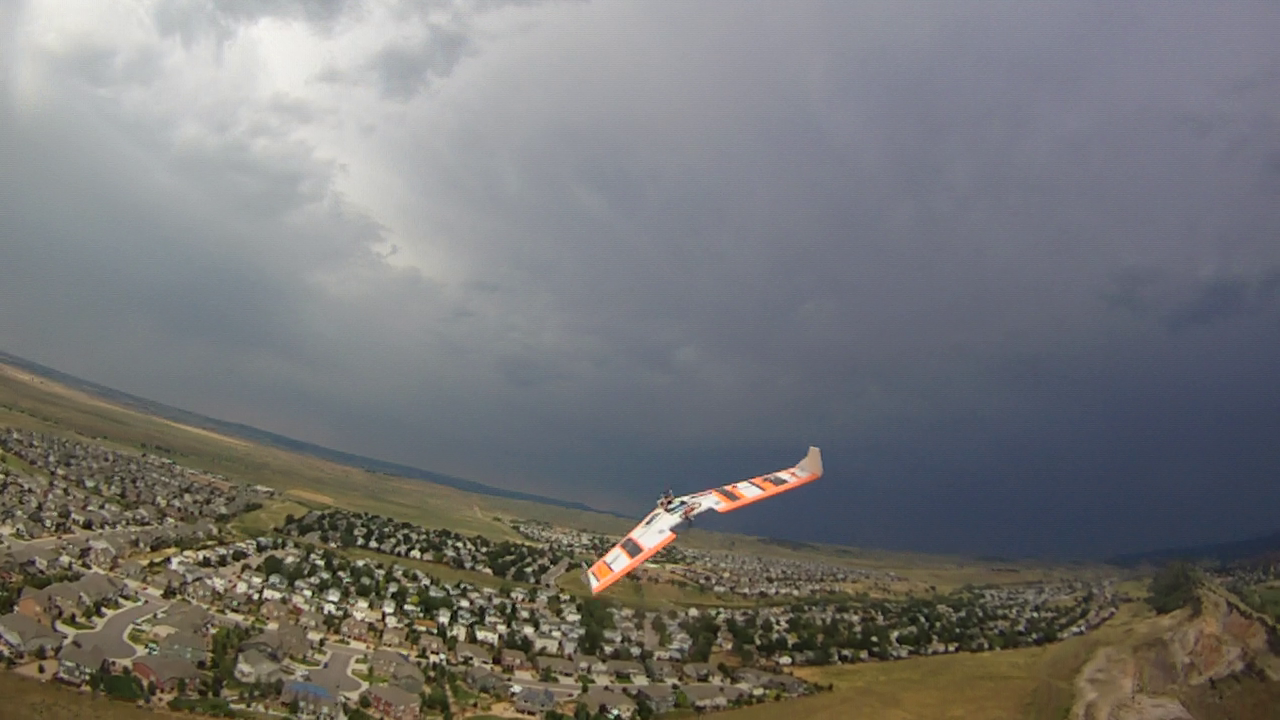
FPV flying wing in flight, captured by the HD camera of another FPV airplane

Any model aircraft can be modified for FPV. The two most common choices are fixed-wing aircraft and multirotors, although early adopters have converted model helicopters.

==== Fixed wing ====
Fixed-wing aircraft are generally medium-sized with sufficient payload space for the video equipment and large wings capable of supporting the extra weight. Most have a pusher propeller, allowing a "prop free" image on either the live video feed or the high-definition recording. Flying wing designs are popular for FPV, as many pilots believe they provide the best combination of large wing surface area, speed, maneuverability, and gliding ability.

==== Multi-rotor ====
Multicopters, especially quadcopters, have fast been gaining popularity as agile camera platforms that can take high-quality video while hovering and maneuvering in tight spaces. This increase in popularity has come about mainly due to new manufacturing techniques and a reduction in component costs, making this side of the FPV hobby more accessible to a wider audience. In recent years, FPV Multirotor racing has become a very fast growing branch of the RC hobby.

=== Radio frequencies ===
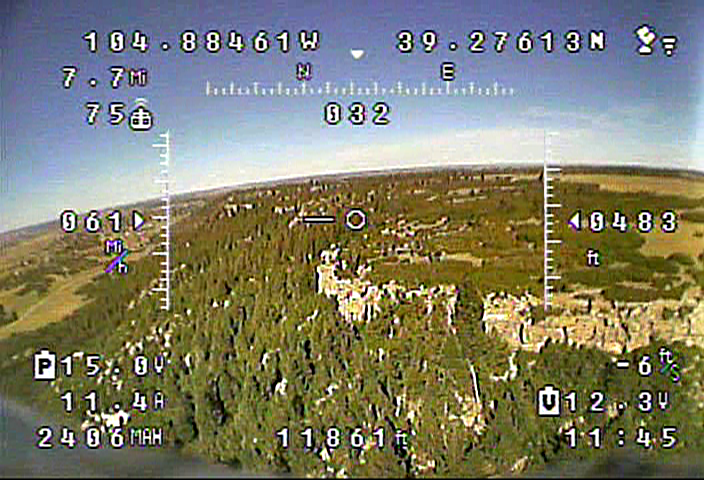
A typical analog FPV video feed with an on-screen display (OSD) readout showing navigational data

The most common frequencies used for RC video transmission are:

900 MHz, 1.2 GHz (amateur radio licensees only), 2.4 GHz, and 5.8 GHz. Specialized long-range UHF control systems operate at 433 MHz (for amateur radio licensees only — especially with Switzerland having exclusive allocations for them, and secondary usage in much of North America) or 869 MHz and are commonly used to achieve greater control range, while the use of directional, high-gain antennas increases video range. Sophisticated setups are capable of achieving a range of 20–30 miles or more, further with the help of extra technologies such as noise-clearing. In addition to the standard video frequencies, 1.3 GHz and 2.3 GHz have emerged to be used without the interference of the bands on more common and used frequencies such as 2.4 GHz. (1.3 and 2.3 GHz is for licensed users only.)

900 MHz offers long range and better object penetration around trees, large plants, and even buildings. However, these lower radio frequencies require a larger antenna, so portability is an issue for some setups. In many countries a radio operator's licence is required to operate at this frequency so commercialization is difficult.

On the other end of the spectrum is the 5.8 GHz frequency which has been growing in popularity in recent years. Hardware for this frequency is extremely cheap, does not require a license to use (under the specified dedicated bands and power outputs) and the antennae are relatively small, allowing for better portability. This frequency offers great video quality when combined with FPV goggles. However, this signal has poor signal penetration, especially around dense objects such as water and concrete, so its effective range is limited.

== Military use ==
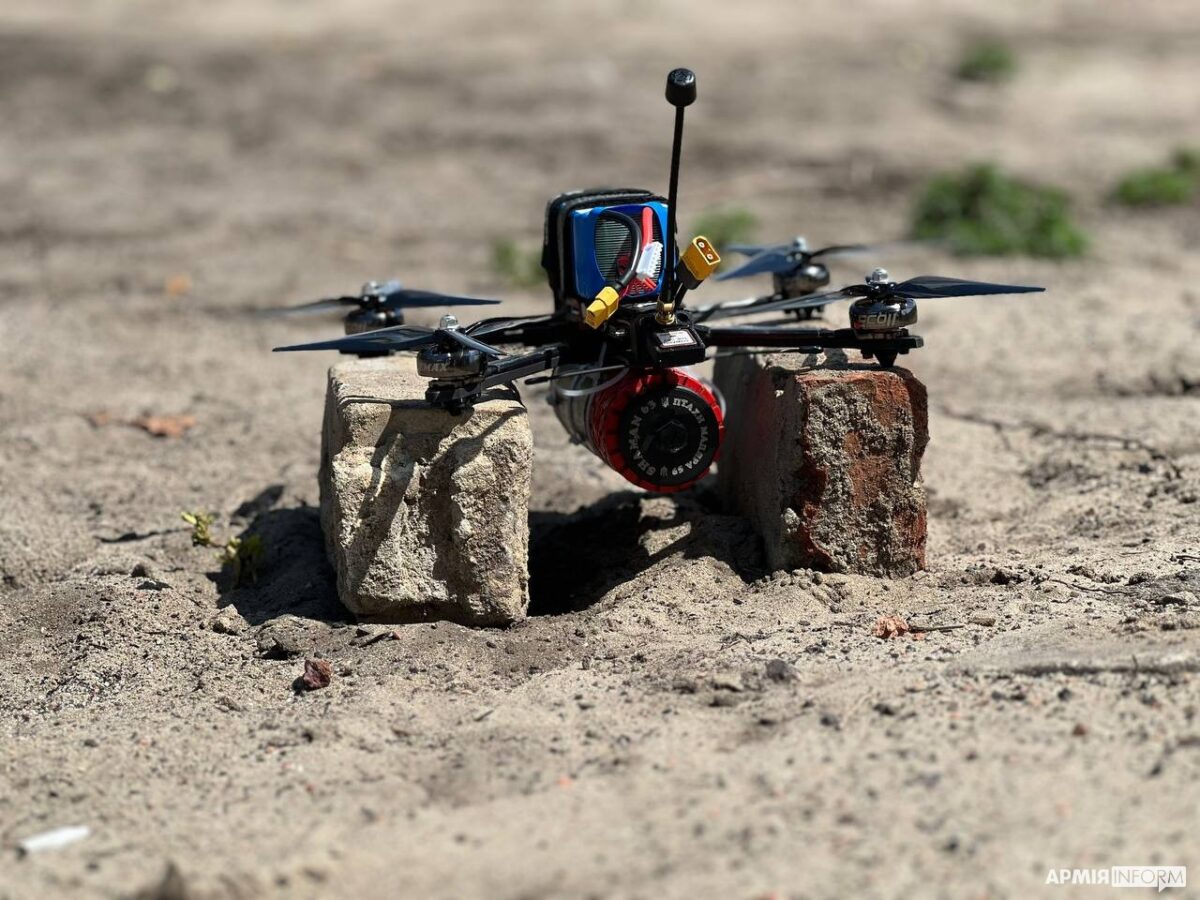
Ukrainian FPV drone armed with explosive in military use

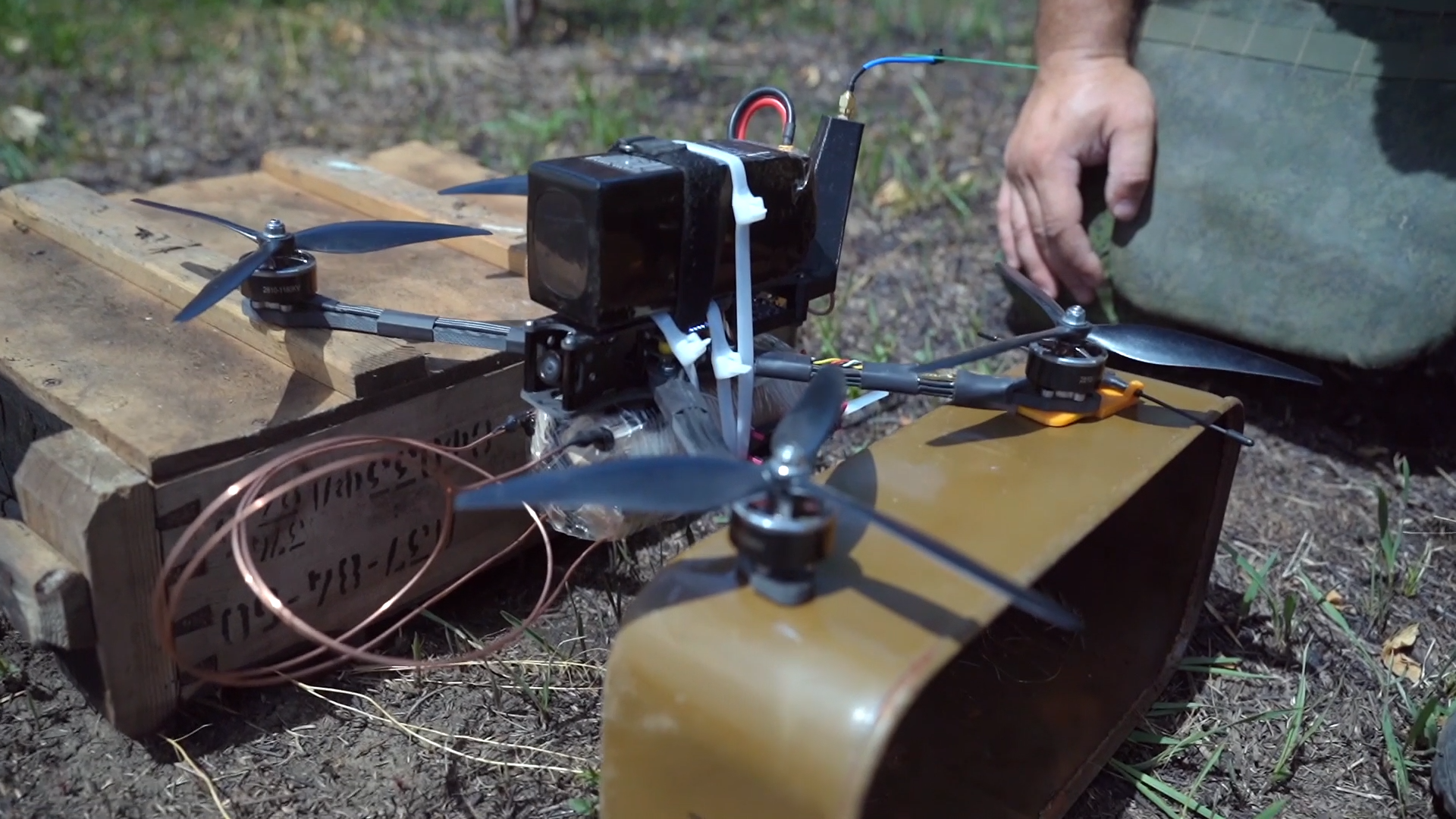
Russian FPV drone with improvised electric impact fuse

During the Russo-Ukrainian war, FPV drones, often armed with explosives and used as suicide drones, also known as kamikaze drones, have seen their use by both sides of the conflict. Initially, their use was mostly by Ukraine, but later also by Russia. For example, the Ukrainian-developed KH-S7 suicide drone could be equipped with up to 1 kilogram of payload over 7 kilometers.

== Regulations and safety ==
The ability of FPV aircraft to fly far beyond the visual range of the pilot and at significant altitudes above the surface has raised some safety concerns regarding risks of collisions with manned aircraft or danger to persons and property on the ground, causing some national aviation authorities to regulate or prohibit FPV flying.

=== United Kingdom ===
The United Kingdom requires that FPV pilots fly with a competent person who is responsible for observing the path of the aircraft for the purposes of collision avoidance and safety; the CAA has recently agreed that this competent person does not have to be capable of flying the aircraft but has been properly briefed by the pilot. The maximum altitude has been raised to 1,000 feet (300 meters) AGL for aircraft weighing up to 3.5 kg. In the UK, FPV UK is a not for profit association of hobbyist radio control model aircraft pilots. They have advised the CAA on matters pertaining to FPV flying and the impact of regulation.

=== United States ===
In the United States, FPV operations and unmanned aircraft generally may be subject to regulation by the following entities:

==== Federal Aviation Administration ====
The legal status of FPV and model aircraft in general under federal aviation law is currently unclear. In March 2014 in the case Huerta v. Pirker, an administrative law judge with the National Transportation Safety Board (NTSB) dismissed an FAA enforcement action against a model aircraft operator under 14 CFR 91.13 (prohibiting careless and reckless operation of an aircraft), ruling that model aircraft are not legally classified as "aircraft" and that they are not subject to any current Federal Aviation Regulations (FARs). This decision was appealed to the full NTSB. On November 17, 2014, the NTSB issued a ruling reversing the administrative law judge's decision and holding that model aircraft are legally considered "aircraft" at least for the purposes of 14 CFR 91.13, and remanded the case to the administrative judge to determine whether Raphael Pirker's actions constituted reckless operation. It remains unclear what other provisions of the Federal Aviation Regulations are applicable to model aircraft, but it is likely that every regulation applicable to "aircraft" generally would potentially apply under this standard.

On June 18, 2014, the Federal Aviation Administration (FAA) issued a notice of interpretation regarding the Special Rule for Model Aircraft in Section 336 of the FAA Modernization and Reform Act passed by Congress in February 2012, which exempted model aircraft meeting certain criteria from future FAA rule making. In this document, the FAA stated its position that model aircraft flown using FPV video goggles do not satisfy the definitional requirement in Sec. 336 that model aircraft be "flown within visual line of sight of the person operating the aircraft," and that, "Model aircraft that do not meet these statutory requirements are nonetheless unmanned aircraft, and as such, are subject to all existing FAA regulations, as well as future rule making action, and the FAA intends to apply its regulations to such unmanned aircraft." In the long term, the FAA is developing regulations for small unmanned aircraft systems which may or may not impact FPV flight.

The notice of interpretation further stated that even model aircraft that do qualify for the Sec. 336 exemption are legally considered aircraft, and the FAA has authority to pursue enforcement actions against model aircraft operators who do not comply with certain provisions of Part 91 of the Federal Aviation Regulations, including 14 CFR 91.113, which requires that "vigilance shall be maintained by each person operating an aircraft so as to see and avoid other aircraft." Because the FAA has not yet sought to enforce this regulation against unmanned aircraft operators, whether it applies to model aircraft and what actions are necessary for compliance are currently unknown. However, the FAA has stated numerous times that it does not believe video-piloted unmanned aircraft are capable of "seeing and avoiding" other aircraft as required by this regulation, implying that the FAA views FPV operations as a violation of this regulation and therefore subject to potential enforcement action.

==== Federal Communications Commission ====
There are additional legal implications related to the use of radio frequencies for command and control of FPV aircraft. Licensed amateur radio operators are expressly allowed to use amateur radio frequencies for telecommand of model aircraft. However, the Federal Communications Commission prohibits using amateur radio frequencies for commercial activity (generally any form of economic gain or for-profit activity). The FCC has not yet addressed the issue of creating designated command and control frequencies for commercial unmanned aircraft, and most civilian unmanned aircraft continue to use amateur radio frequencies, even when used for commercial purposes. Though it has not so far pursued any enforcement actions related to use of amateur radio frequencies for commercial unmanned aircraft, the FCC has the authority to levy civil forfeitures and fines into the tens of thousands of dollars for violations of its regulations.

==== National Park Service ====
Under a 2014 edict from the National Park Service, model aircraft and other unmanned aircraft operations are prohibited on all land administered by the National Park Service, with some exceptions for preexisting model aircraft fields that were established prior to the adoption of this rule. Because the National Park Service does not have jurisdiction over airspace, which is exclusively governed by the FAA, this rule only applies to unmanned aircraft flown from National Park Service land. It does not apply to overflight of National Park Service land by unmanned aircraft operated elsewhere.

==== State and local governments ====
There are a wide variety of state and local laws and ordinances affecting model aircraft in general and FPV specifically. Many state and local governments restrict or prohibit model aircraft from being flown at local parks. Some state laws purport to restrict or prohibit aerial photography using unmanned aircraft, though such laws would likely be found invalid if challenged in court due to federal preemption, as the FAA has exclusive regulatory jurisdiction over all aircraft and airspace from the surface up.

==== Academy of Model Aeronautics ====
The Academy of Model Aeronautics' (AMA) official Safety Code's rules (which governs flying at AMA affiliated fields) allows FPV flight under the parameters of AMA Document #550, which requires that FPV aircraft be kept within visual line of sight with a spotter maintaining unaided visual contact with the model at all times. Because these restrictions prohibit flying beyond the visual range of the pilot (an ability which many view as the most attractive aspect of FPV), most hobbyists that fly FPV do so outside of regular sanctioned RC clubs' membership and those clubs' flying fields.

=== Canada ===
The Canadian equivalent of the AMA, the MAAC, has similar regulations to that of the AMA for FPV piloting.

=== India ===
Drone operations in India are regulated by the DGCA under the Drone Rules 2021, requiring registration of all drones (except Nano 250g) on the Digital Sky Platform for a UIN. "No Permission, No Takeoff" (NPNT) is mandatory, requiring digital flight clearance. Key limits: 400 ft max altitude, direct line-of-sight only, and no-fly zones.

=== Australia ===
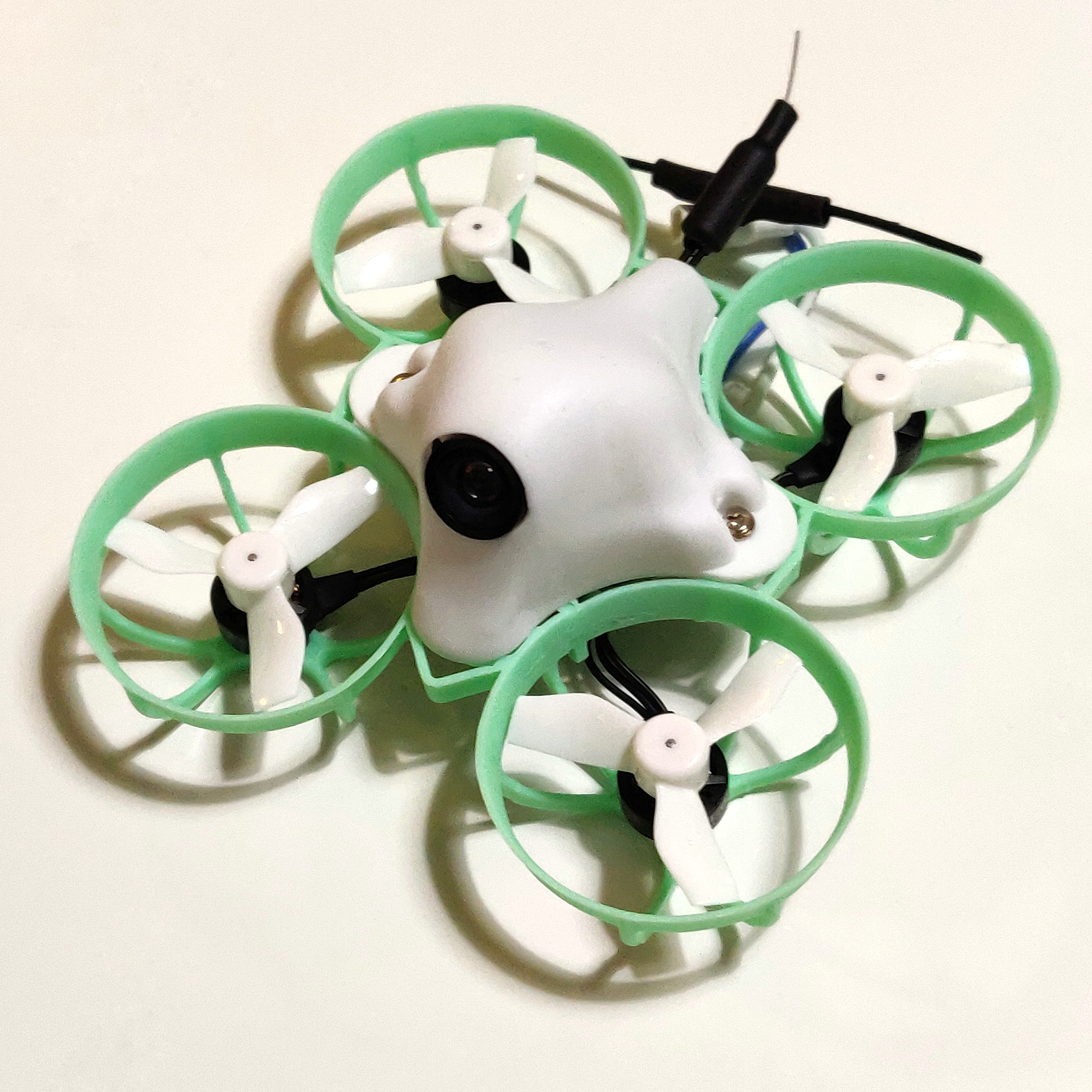
Lightweight models, such as this 31 gram FPV "whoop" drone, are usually exempt from regulation.

In Australia the operation of FPV aircraft is subject to laws and regulations regarding radio spectrum use which is enforced by the ACMA (Australian Communications and Media Authority) and the use of airspace as enforced by CASA (Civil Aviation Safety Authority).

All unmanned aeronautical activities in Australia are ruled by CASR (Civil Aviation Safety Regulations) Part 101 which includes sections for UAV's and model aircraft among other operations. It is currently under review and new regulations specifically relating to UAV's and model aircraft are anticipated.

- Any commercial use (i.e. any form of payment or benefit) of an unmanned aircraft results in the operations falling under the Unmanned Aerial Vehicle (UAV) Operations Section, CASR 101–1. This section requires formal licensing, training and documentation procedures to be approved and followed. These requirements will typically require an outlay in the order of thousands of dollars which places commercial operations beyond the reach of most hobbyists. This is one area currently under review by CASA with initial reports indicating a potential option of simpler registration for light-weight UAV's without requiring formal certification.
- Non-commercial use is governed by section 101-3 which includes requirements that:
  - No commercial benefit is to be obtained from operating the model – to be flown only for sport or recreational purposes
  - Maximum weight of 150 kg (models over 25 kg must be operated within a club setting under additional conditions)
  - Models under 100 grams are exempt from regulation
  - Only to be flown in daylight unless under written procedures of an authorised organisation (such as the MAAA)
  - The model must remain within continuous direct sight of the operator
  - When within 3 nautical miles of an aerodrome or when within controlled airspace, flight is limited to 400 ft above ground level

==== Practical considerations ====
- The MAAA (Model Aeronautical Association of Australia) has published a "First Person View (FPV) Policy". To comply with the CASR rules, the FPV pilot must not be the actual pilot in charge of the model, and a second pilot must keep the model in sight at all times and be capable of taking control of the aircraft without any action from the FPV pilot. This has the effect of making the FPV pilot a "guest pilot" for the flight, with all responsibility for the safety and operation of the flight resting with the line-of-sight pilot. An update to this document says that "it is acceptable that a Return to Home system is fitted and functional, and the model then controlled by a single transmitter. The Return to Home system shall conform to the requirements of MOP067"
- While holding an amateur radio license will allow an FPV operator to use transmitter power levels sufficient for flights beyond a few hundred metres, the CASR 101-3 requirement for the model to be in direct sight of the pilot remains a legal stumbling block for the hobby.

== See also ==
- Drone racing
- Remote ID
- Regulation of unmanned aerial vehicles
