= Parrot Bebop =

French camera drone

Bebop
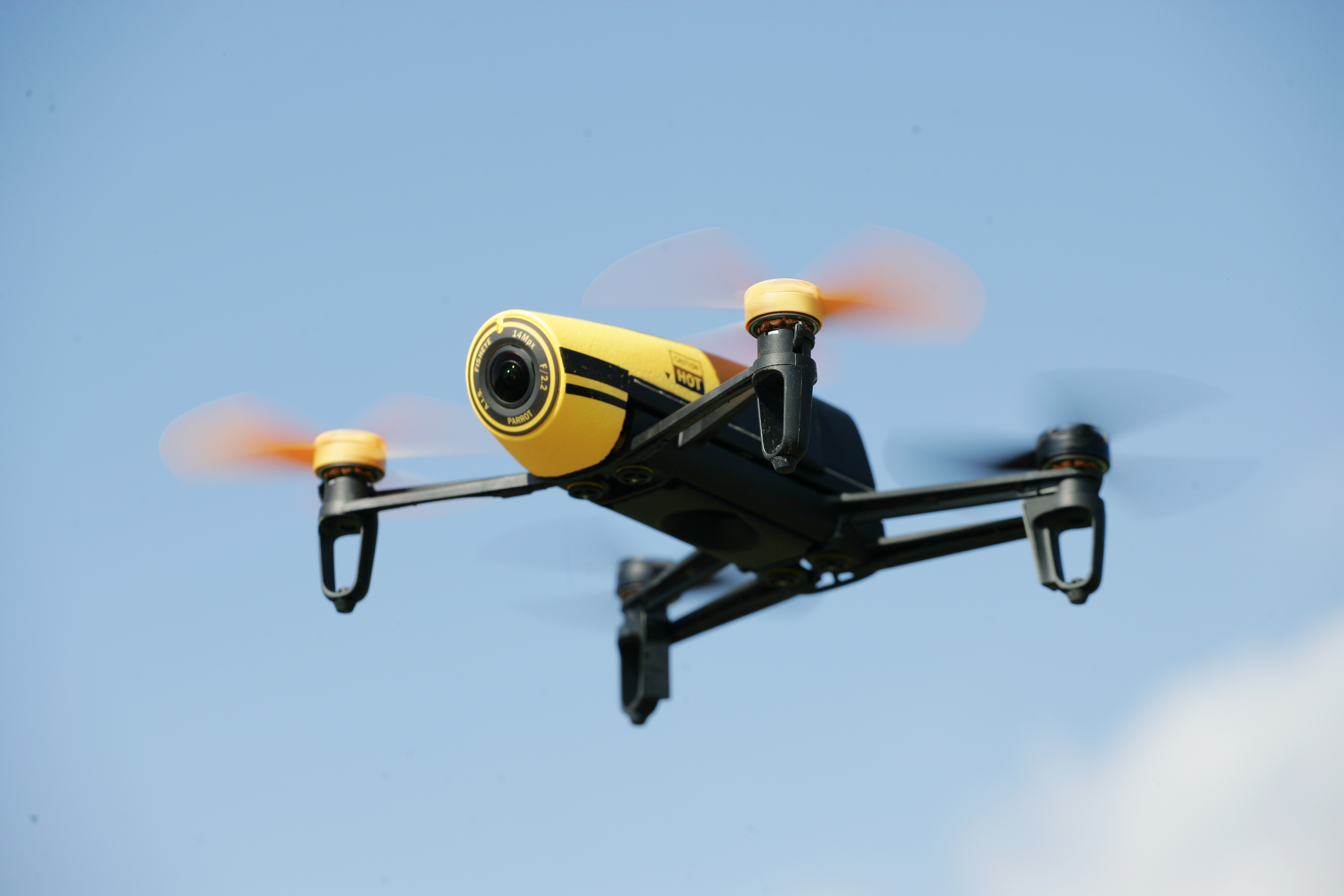
- Parrot Bebop in flight

General information
- Type: Camera drone
- National origin: France
- Manufacturer: Parrot SA
- Status: Discontinued

History
- Manufactured: 2014–2019
- Introduction date: May 2014

The Parrot Bebop is a French teleoperated quadcopter drone produced by Parrot SA as the successor to the AR.Drone.

== Design and development ==
The Bebop was announced in May 2014. Unlike its predecessor, the AR.Drone 2.0, the Bebop has a built-in GNSS receiver, allowing it to autonomously follow predetermined flight paths using GPS, GLONASS, or Galileo satellites. The Bebop, which competed with the DJI Phantom 2 Vision, has a 14-megapixel camera with a f2.2 180-degree fisheye lens capable of capturing 1080p video. In lieu of a motorized gimbal, the drone's onboard image processor is capable of panning, zooming, and 3-axis stabilization by "carving out" a rectangular 1920×1080 section of the 180-degree image. The Bebop is also capable of streaming life video to an Oculus Rift headset, giving the pilot a first-person view. Power is provided by a 1200 mAh battery, giving the Bebop a maximum flight time of 12 minutes.

An improved model, the Bebop 2, was announced in November 2015. The Bebop 2 is powered by a 2700 mAh battery, doubling the flight time to 25 minutes. Other improvements over the original Bebop include improved wind resistance and 8 gigabytes of internal storage, though there is no microSD card slot. The Bebop 2 also has a fail-safe to hover in place if the drone loses connection with the pilot's phone, though The Verge found that such disconnections were frequent. The Bebop 2 Power was announced in September 2017 with a 3350 mAh battery, further increasing flight time to 30 minutes. The Bebop 2 Power 32GB with 32GB of internal storage was released with the Bebop-Pro 3d Modelling package for professional users.

In October 2017, Parrot released the Bebop-Pro Thermal for professional users. Based on the Bebop 2 Power, the Bebop-Pro Thermal has a rear-mounted Teledyne FLIR ONE Pro thermal camera and 32GB of internal storage.

Parrot discontinued all consumer products, including the Bebop, in July 2019 to focus on the enterprise versions of the Anafi.

== Variants ==
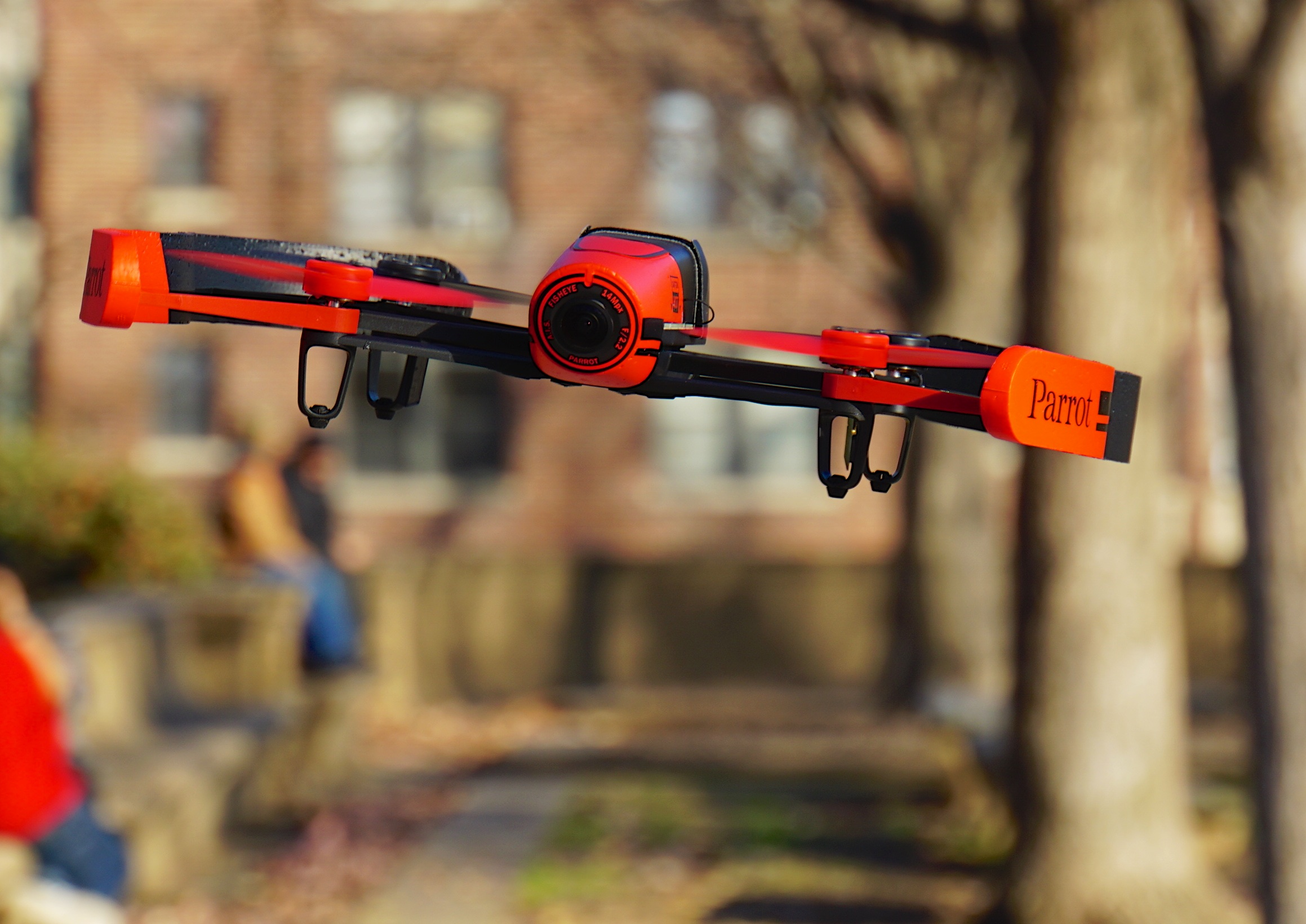
The original Bebop with propeller guards attached

Bebop
Originally known as the AR.Drone 3.0. Original variant with a 14MP fisheye camera, a GNSS receiver, and a 1200 mAh battery giving it flight time of 12 minutes. Announced in May 2014.
Bebop 2
Improved model with 8GB of internal storage, improved wind resistance, an in-flight disconnection fail-safe, and a 2700 mAh battery giving it a flight time of 25 minutes. Announced in November 2015.

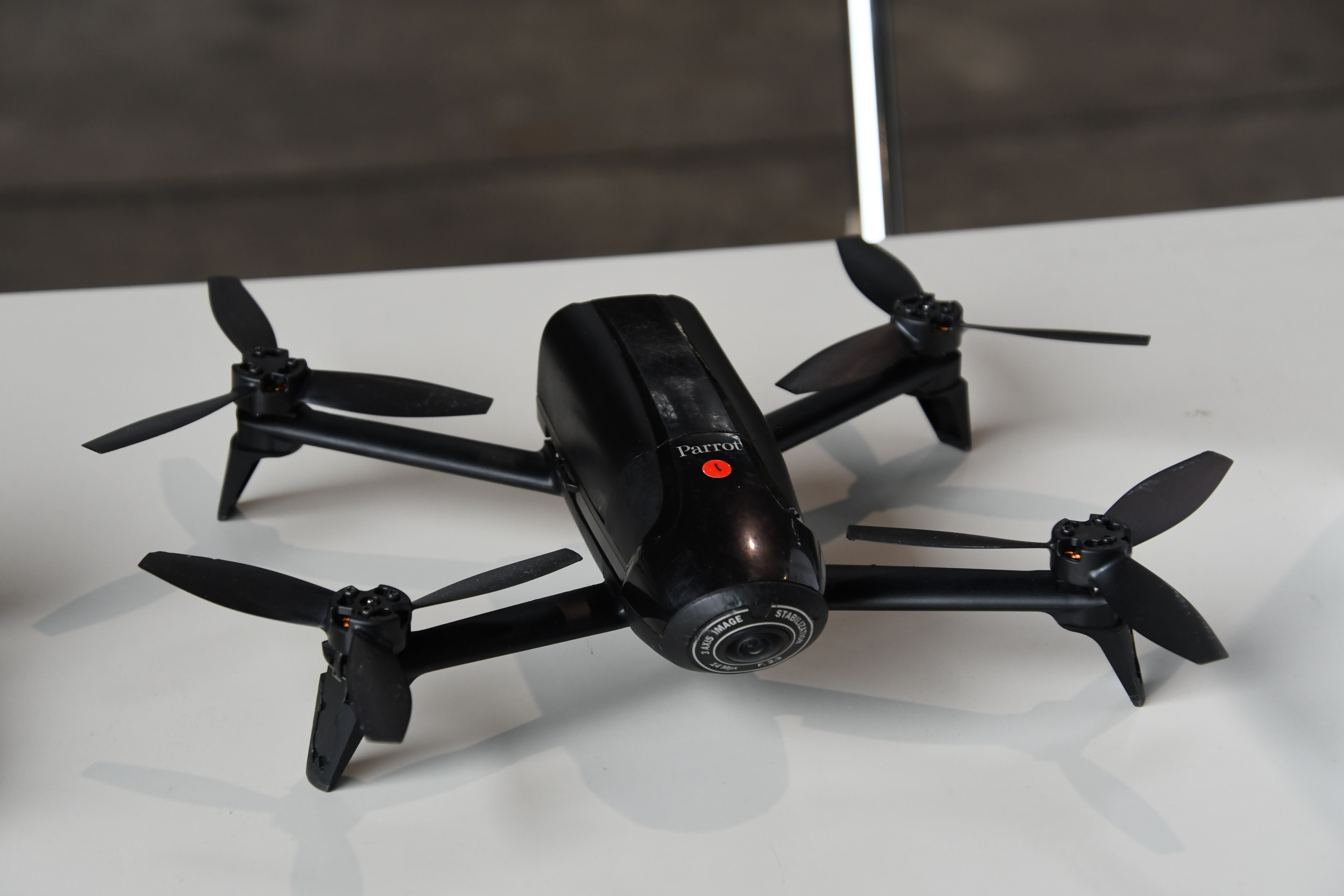
Bebop 2 Power

Bebop 2 Power
As Bebop 2 but with a 3350 mAh battery, giving it a flight time of 30 minutes. Announced in September 2017.
Bebop 2 Power 32GB
As Bebop 2 Power but with 32GB of internal storage. Released in the Bebop-Pro 3D Modelling package.
Bebop-Pro Thermal
As Bebop 2 Power but with 32GB of internal storage and a rear-mounted Teledyne FLIR ONE Pro thermal camera. Released in October 2017.

== Vulnerabilities ==
During the DEF CON convention in August 2015, a presenter demonstrated that the Bebop could be hijacked mid-flight via a cyberattack. The demonstration showed that a Wi-Fi deauthentication attack could disconnect the drone from the pilot's mobile device, allowing anyone with the Parrot app to pair with it and take control.

== Specifications (Bebop) ==
Data from

General characteristics

- Length: 0.28 m (11 in) (0.32 m (1 ft 1 in) with propeller guards)
- Width: 0.32 m (1 ft 1 in) (0.38 m (1 ft 3 in) with propeller guards)
- Height: 0.036 m (1 in)
- Empty weight: 0.380 kg (0.84 lb) (0.400 kg (0.88 lb) with propeller guards)
- Battery: 1200 mAh lithium polymer battery
- Powerplant: 4 × Brushless DC electric motor
- Propellers: 3-bladed polycarbonate propellers

Performance

- Endurance: 12 minutes

Avionics

- Cameras: 14MP fisheye camera
- Processors: Dual-core Parrot P7 (ARM Cortex-A9)
- GNSS compatibility: GPS, GLONASS, Galileo

== See also ==
- History of unmanned aerial vehicles

Aircraft of comparable role, configuration, and era

- DJI Phantom
- DJI Spark
- GoPro Karma

Related lists

- List of unmanned aerial vehicles
