= Parrot AR.Drone =

French quadcopter

AR.Drone

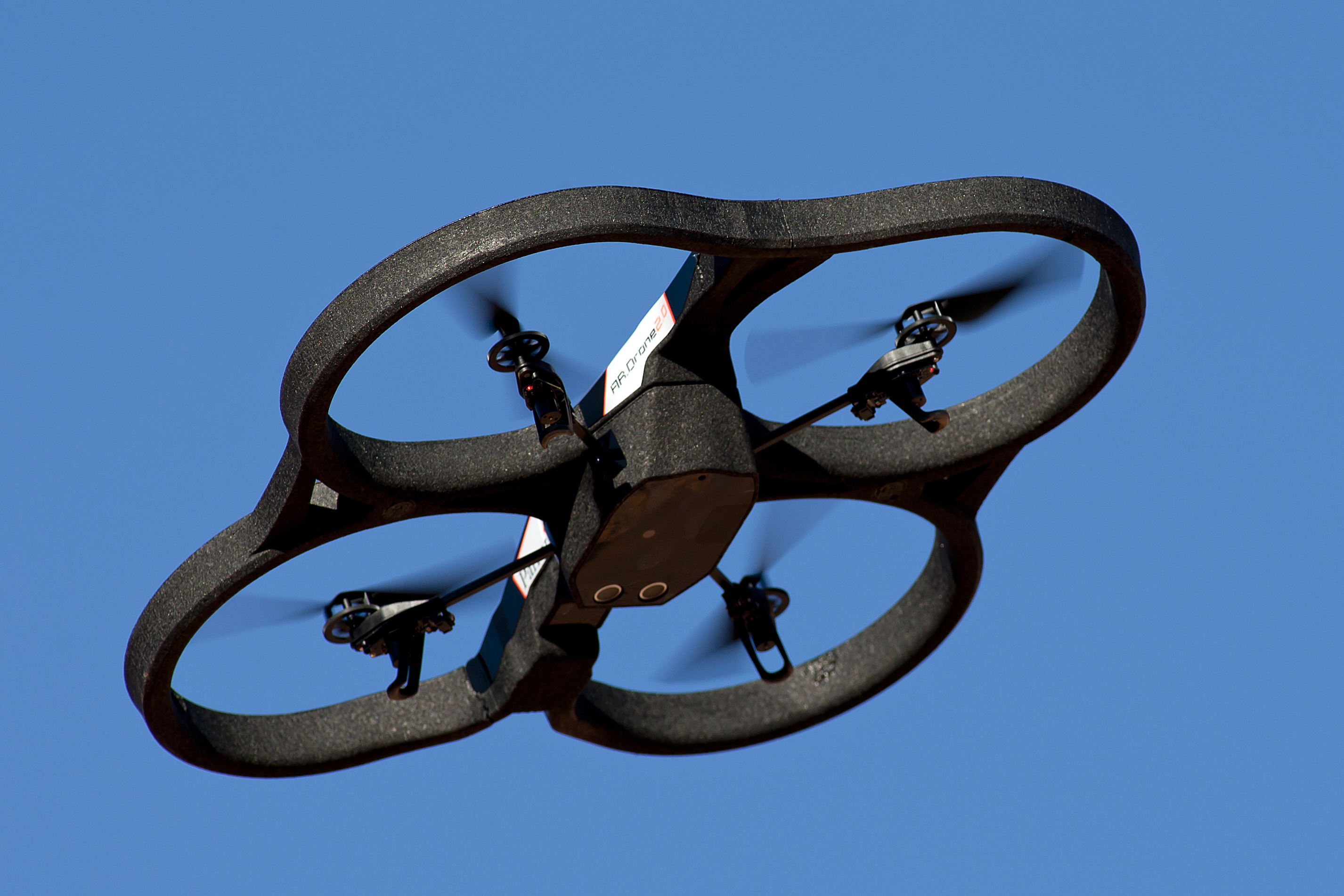
- Parrot AR.Drone 2.0 in flight

General information
- Type: Unmanned aerial vehicle
- National origin: France
- Manufacturer: Parrot SA

History
- Manufactured: 2010–c. 2018
- Introduction date: January 2010

The Parrot AR.Drone is a discontinued remote-controlled quadcopter, built by the French company Parrot.

== Design and development ==
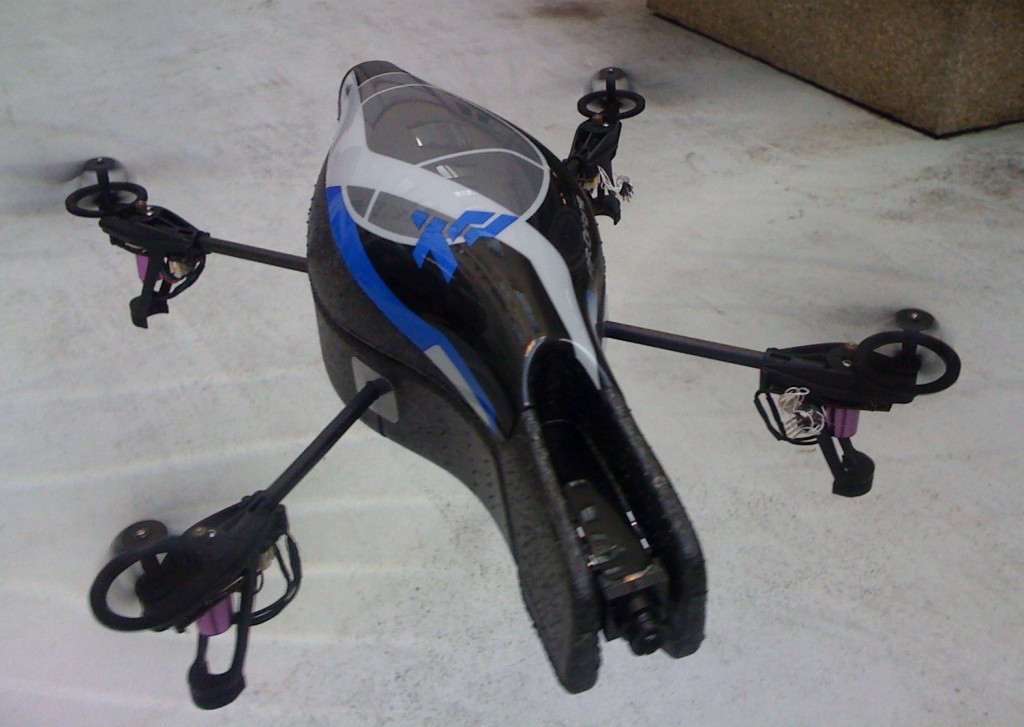
AR.Drone pre-production prototype with outdoor hull

The Parrot AR.Drone was unveiled at the International CES 2010 in Las Vegas along with a demonstration of the iOS applications used to control it. The main airframe of the AR.Drone is constructed from PA66 plastic and carbon fiber tubes. Two interchangeable hulls were supplied with the airframe, one is designed for indoor and one for outdoor flight; the former made of expanded polypropylene (EPP) foam with bumpers to protect the propellers at the cost of reduced flight performance. The AR.Drones is powered by four brushed or brushless DC electric motors, depending on the version, and a 1000 mAh lithium polymer battery gives the drone a maximum flight time of 15 minutes. The drone was released alongside several augmented reality games, allowing users to race through obstacle courses or engage in simulated dogfights between multiple AR.Drones. The drone has an embedded computer with an ARM9 processor and a Linux operating system.

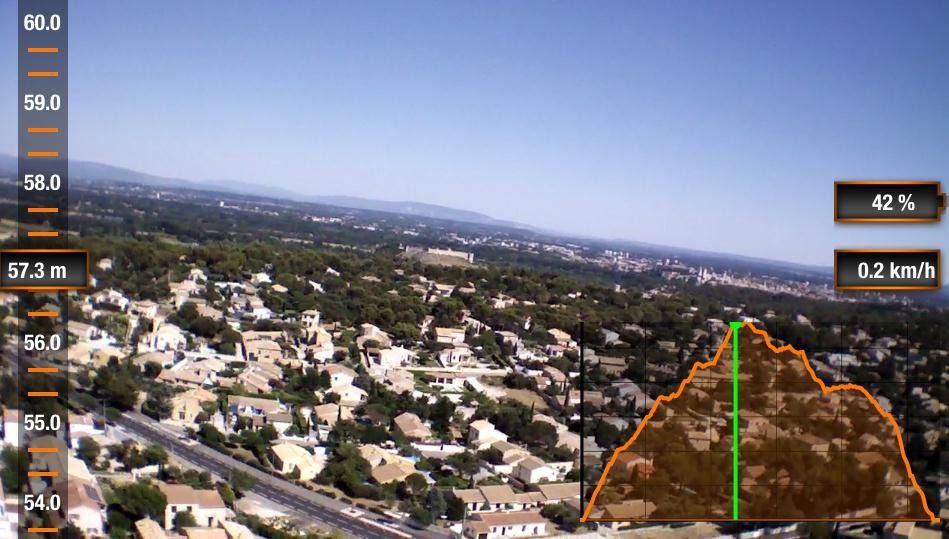
AR.Drone application HUD

The AR.Drone is designed to be controlled by mobile or tablet operating systems, such as iOS or Android within their respective apps or the unofficial software available for Windows Phone, Samsung BADA and Symbian devices.

The successor to the original drone, the AR.Drone 2.0, was unveiled at CES Las Vegas 2012. The AR.Drone 2.0 is outwardly similar to its predecessor, being powered by four brushless motors, but has several internal improvements including an ARM Cortex-A8 processor, a 3-axis magnetometer, and an upgraded camera with a 720p resolution. The drone also features a pressure sensor which Parrot claims allows it to fly up to 164 feet (50 m), though flight testing by Popular Science found that the WiFi link between the drone and controlling device would disconnect before reaching that altitude. The AR.Drone 2.0 was released alongside a new flight app which was backwards compatible with the original AR.Drone. Popular Science praised the AR.Drone 2.0 for its improved ease of use over its predecessor, but criticized its average flight time of 15–25 minutes.

At CES 2013, Parrot announced the Flight Recorder add-on for the AR.Drone 2.0, which the company compared to the "black box" of a commercial aircraft. It adds 4GB of storage to the drone, along with GPS tracking and flight data recording. Flight Recorder features can be controlled via mobile phone and desktop applications, with "Director Mode" and "Rescue Mode" included. An extended battery designed to increase flight time by up to 50% was also launched alongside the Flight Recorder.

By February 2018, the AR.Drone 2.0 Elite Edition and Power Edition were no longer being sold.

== Operational history ==
=== Third party uses ===
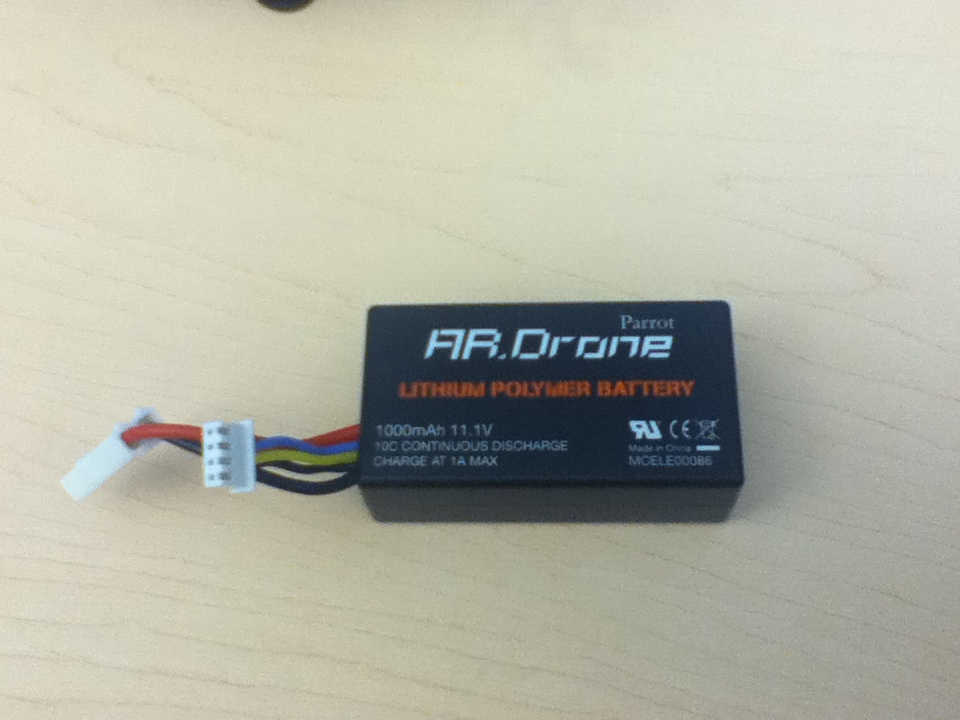
Lithium polymer battery for Parrot AR.Drone with JST-XH connector (right) and mini-Tamiya connector (left)

To aid third-party developers, Parrot launched the AR.Drone open API game development platform. Due to this open platform, affordability, and wide range of onboard sensory equipment, the AR.Drone is becoming an increasingly popular tool in research and education. It has been used for experiments with visual-based autonomous navigation, autonomous surveillance, and human-machine interaction.

In France, the AR.Drone 2.0 was tested by a Special Operations unit for aerial reconnaissance, while other companies have been developing software that allows the drone to track sports activities, and generate training feedback. An AR.Drone was used by Tim Pool during the Occupy Wall Street protest, running modified software that allowed it to stream directly to an internet channel. He theorized that a chain of command could be set up, where multiple people could step up and take control should the primary operator be detained by police. To further this, he began the development of a new control system, replacing the existing Wi-Fi hotspot with a 3G chip. This would allow users to control drones via the internet, and potentially from remote locations.

=== Reception ===
By early 2013, around half a million units of the AR.Drone and its successor had been sold. It received a 2010 CES Innovations award for Electronic Gaming Hardware, and was also awarded Best Smart Product of 2015 according to Wellbots Top 25 Smart Products Ranking of 2015. The AR.Drone 2.0 was praised for the relative ease with which pilots could learn how to fly it; the original release required more intense practice.

Since its release, individuals, organizations, and governments have expressed concern over the use of AR.Drones for surveillance. Although the technology required to feed and record live video taken from unmanned aerial vehicles (UAVs) existed before the release of the AR.Drone was not widely available to members of the public. In Germany, consumer affairs minister Ilse Aigner described the drone as a privacy threat, and called for restrictions to be placed on the use of cameras mounted on aerial platforms. A UK advertising campaign, showing an AR.Drone being flown into the grounds of Buckingham Palace was withdrawn after concerns that it was demonstrating illegal use of the drone. In the US, the use of AR.Drones are governed by the Federal Aviation Administration at the Federal level and local jurisdiction, which restricts the use of small UAS above 400 ft (120 m).

== Variants ==
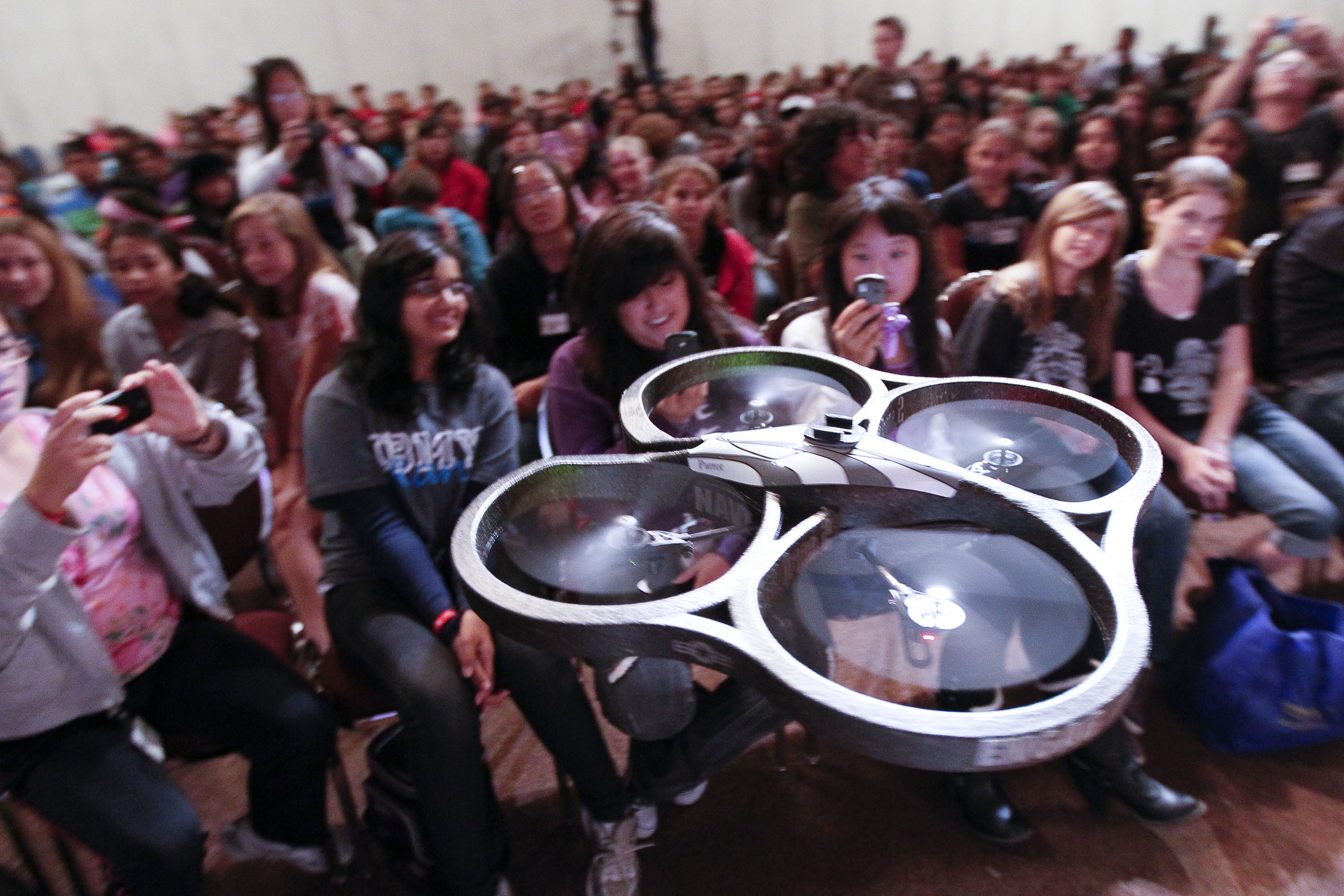
US Navy STEM drone demonstration using an original AR.Drone with an indoor hull.

AR.Drone
Original variant with PA66 and carbon fiber tube construction, four brushed or brushless electric motors, a 480p forward-facing camera, a 144p downward camera, and interchangeable indoor and outdoor hulls. Power is provided by a single 1000 mAh lithium polymer battery, giving it a maximum flight time of 15 minutes. Announced in January 2010.

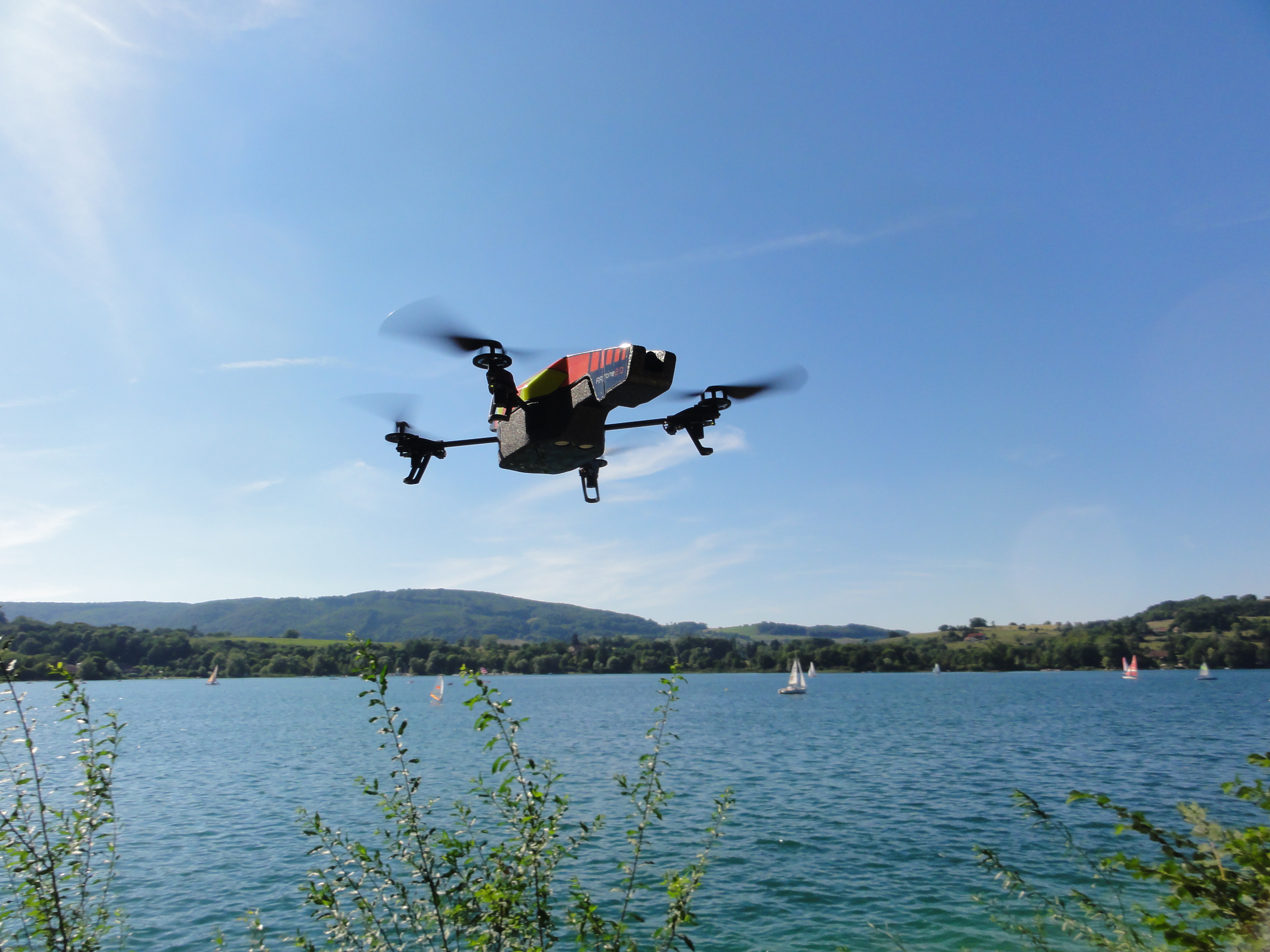
AR.Drone 2.0 in flight with outdoor hull

AR.Drone 2.0
Improved AR.Drone with brushless motors, an ARM Cortex-A8 processor, a 3-axis magnetometer, a 720p front camera, an air pressure sensor, and a flight time of 15–25 minutes. Announced in January 2012. An optional "Flight Recorder" add-on and a high density battery were also made available.
AR.Drone 2.0 Power Edition
Improved AR.Drone 2.0 with the 1500 mAh high density lithium polymer battery as standard equipment, giving it a flight time to 18 minutes per battery.
AR.Drone 2.0 Elite Edition
AR.Drone 2.0 but with three camouflage hull patterns; sand, snow, and jungle.
AR.Drone 2.0 GPS Edition
AR.Drone 2.0 with a GPS module that connects to its USB port, allowing for autonomous flight, flight recording, and a "Return Home" feature.

== Specifications (AR.Drone) ==
Data from

General characteristics

- Length: 0.45 m (1 ft 6 in) (0.525 m (1 ft 8.7 in) with indoor hull)
- Width: 0.29 m (11 in) (0.515 m (1 ft 8.3 in) with indoor hull)
- Empty weight: 0.360 kg (1 lb) (0.400 kg (0.88 lb) with indoor hull)
- Battery: 11.1V 1000 MAh lithium polymer battery
- Powerplant: 4 × 15W brushed or brushless DC electric motors
- Propellers: 2-bladed Carbon tube propellers

Performance

- Maximum speed: 18 km/h (11 mph, 9.7 kn)
- Endurance: 15 minutes

Avionics

- Camera:

- 640×480 pixel 15 FPS CMOS front camera
- 176×144 pixel 60 FPS CMOS vertical camera

- Processor: 468MHz ARM9
- Altimeter: 40kHz ultrasonic rangefinder

== See also ==
- Miniature UAV
- History of unmanned aerial vehicles

Aircraft of comparable role, configuration, and era

- DJI Phantom
- Parrot Bebop

Related lists

- List of unmanned aerial vehicles
