= Parrot SA =

French drone manufacturer

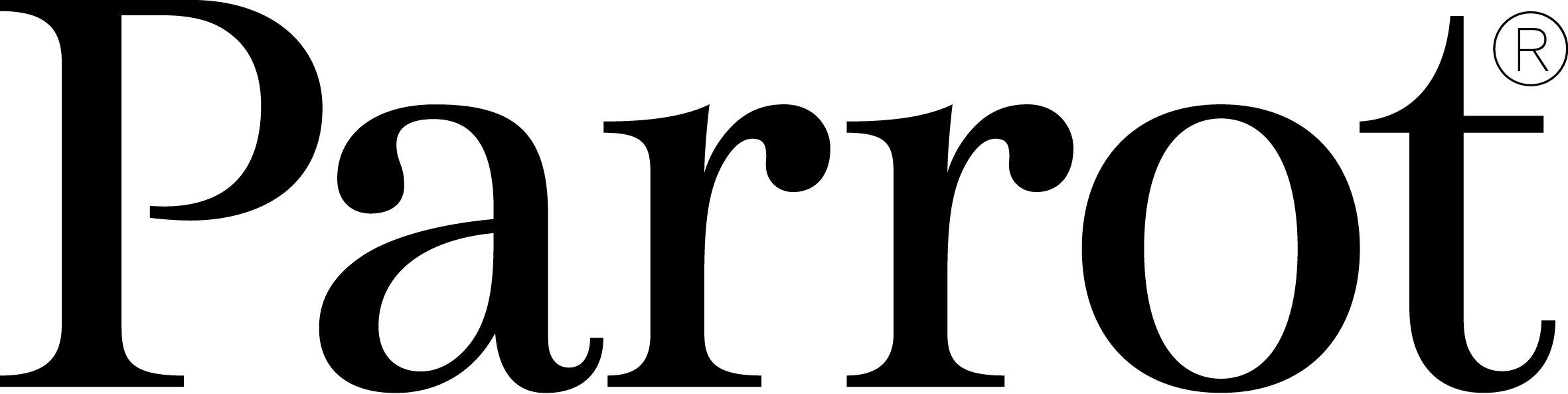
- Type: Société anonyme
- Traded as: Euronext Paris: PARRO; CAC All-Share
- Industry: Technology; consumer electronics; videography; photography
- Founded: January 18, 2006; 20 years ago
- Founder: Jean-Pierre Talvard and Henri Seydoux
- Headquarters: Paris, France
- Area served: Worldwide
- Key people: Henri Seydoux (Chairman & CEO)
- Products: Unmanned aerial vehicles
- Number of employees: 542 (2022)
- Website: www.parrot.com

Parrot SA is a French wireless products manufacturing company based in Paris, France. It was founded in 1994 by Henri Seydoux, Christine de Tourvel and Jean-Pierre Talvard. Since 2017, it has focused exclusively on drone manufacturing.

== Products ==
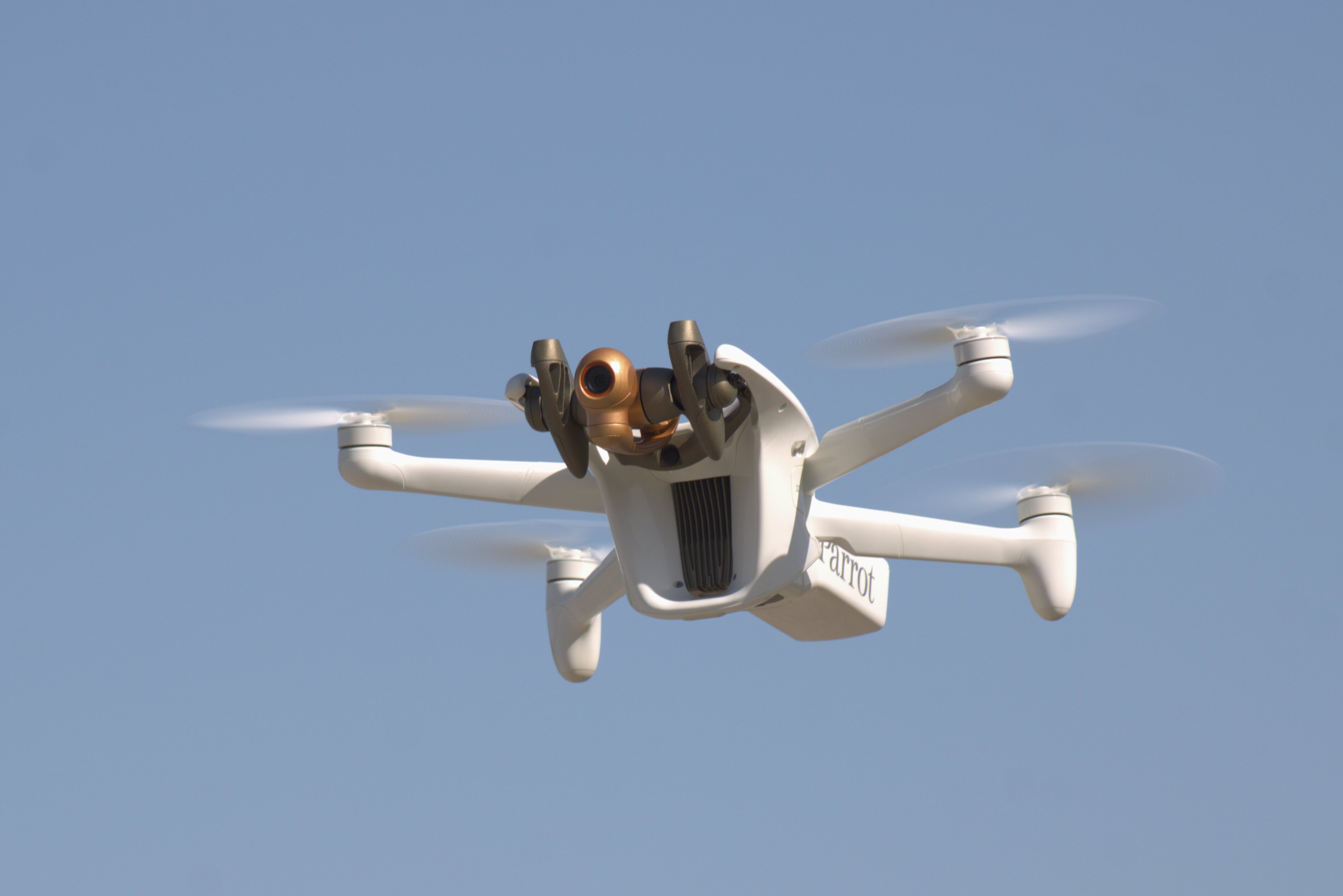
ANAFI Ai

The company produces voice recognition and signal processing technologies for embedded systems and unmanned aerial vehicles (UAVs). Its early product line included car telephony components such as digital signal processors (DSP), noise reduction algorithms, Bluetooth software, and hands-free kits. The products are sold to consumers through retailers, and are also incorporated into vehicles with the factory-installed audio system.

== History ==
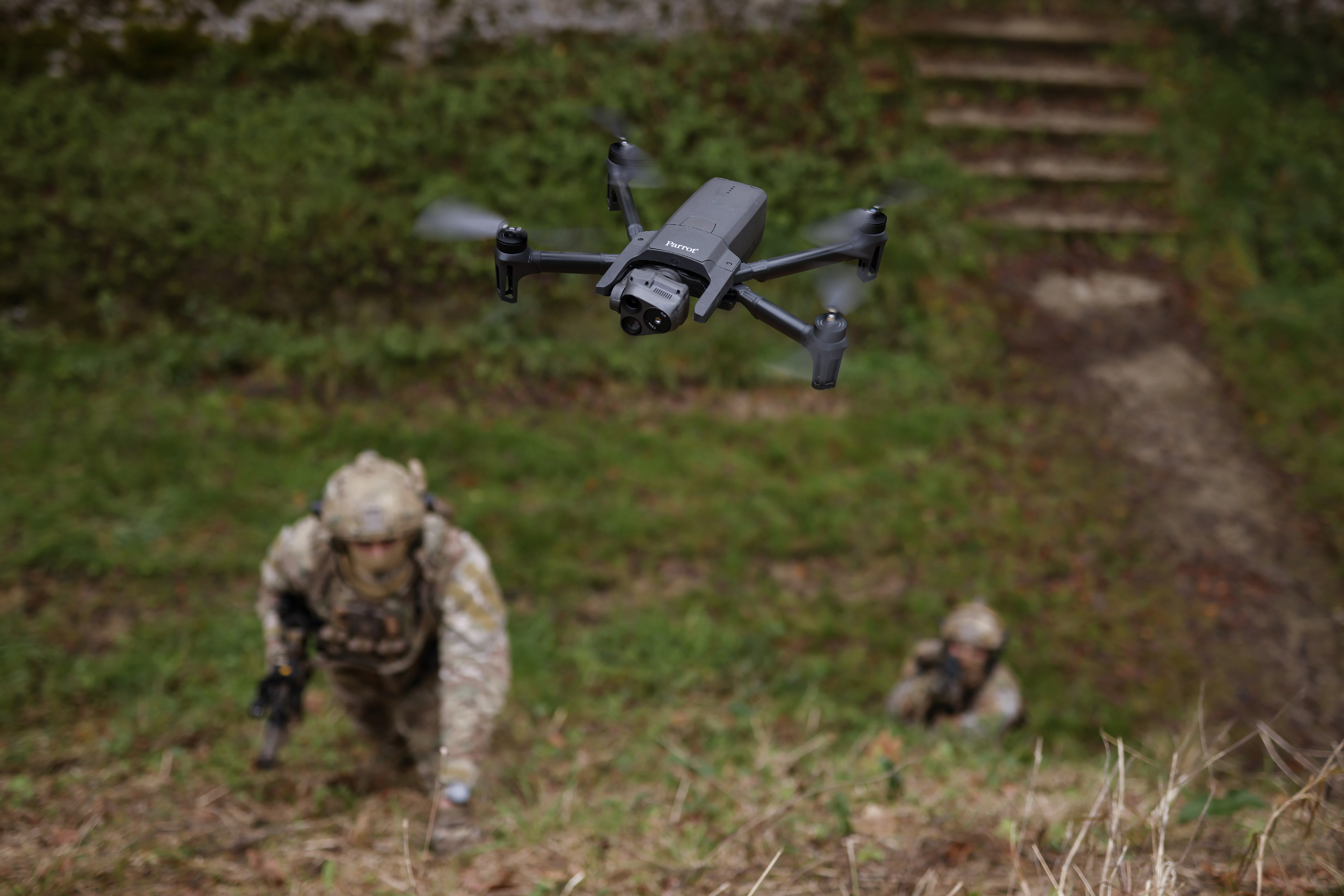
ANAFI USA

In 1995 Parrot introduced Voicemate, a personal digital assistant with voice recognition. It was used by many visually impaired people, including Stevie Wonder.

In 2000 Parrot launched the first Bluetooth hands-free car kit in partnership with Ericsson.

In 2006, still developing the use of Bluetooth, the company also produced home products like digital photo frames and high fidelity wireless speakers.

In 2008, Parrot launched a Design By collection, featuring designers like Andrée Putman, Martin Szekely and Philippe Starck.

In January 2010, Parrot introduced at CES Las Vegas the Parrot AR.Drone flying hardware piloted over Wi-Fi with a smartphone and Open API game development platform, ARdrone.org.

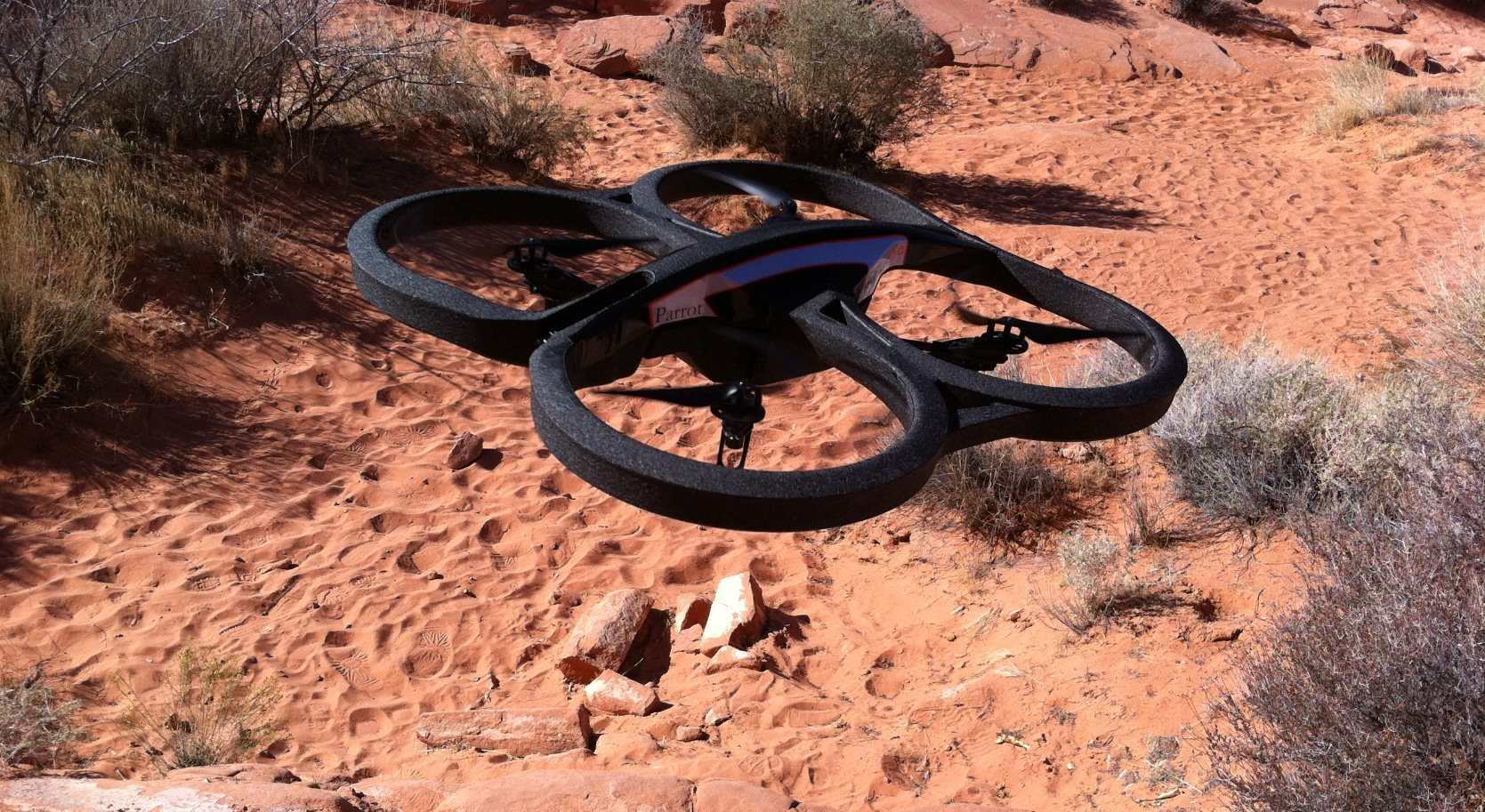
Parrot AR.Drone 2.0 take-off, Nevada (CES 2012)

In 2012 Parrot bought 57% of Swiss drone company SenseFly as well as 25% of the Swiss photogrammetry company Pix4D. Both companies are spin-offs from EPFL.

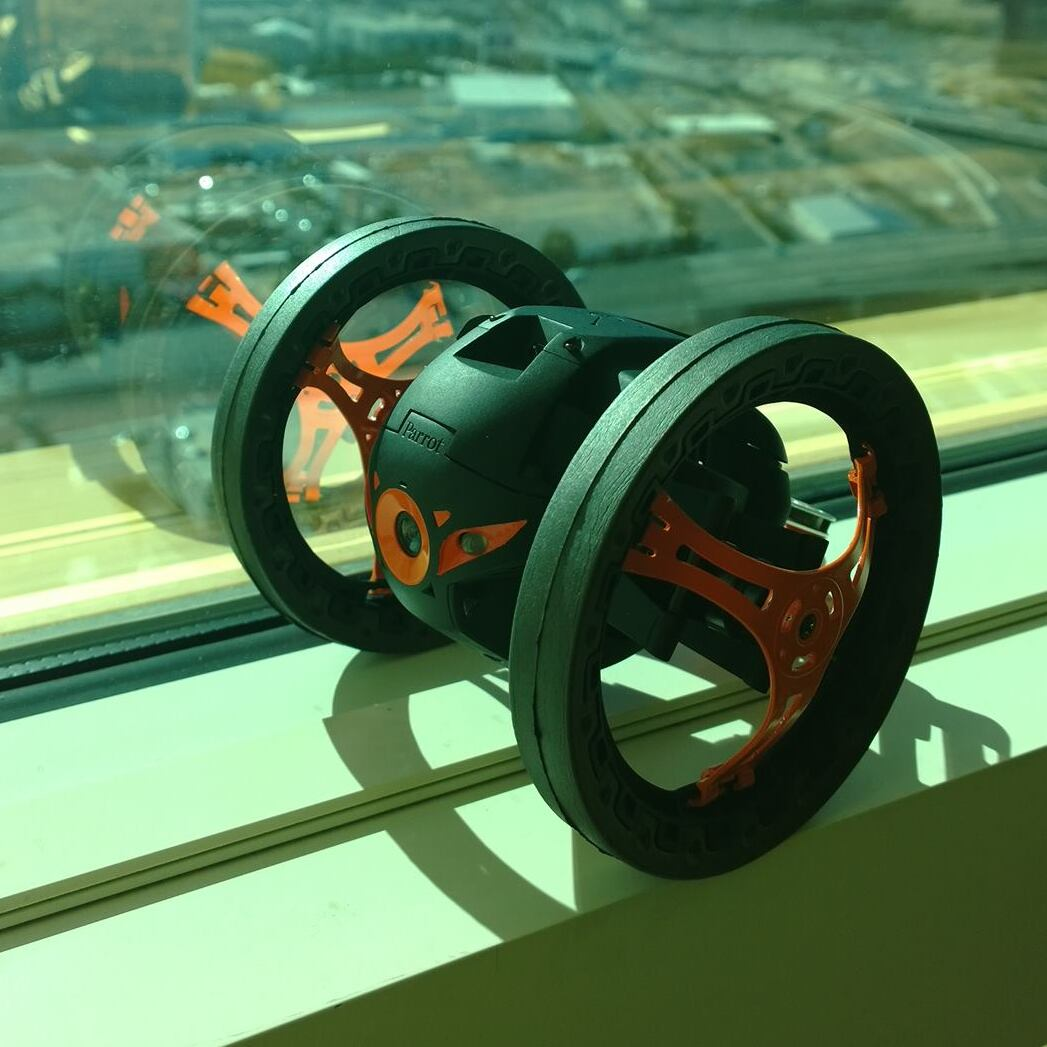
Parrot Jumping Sumo robotic toy

In 2014 Parrot introduced the mini-drones Rolling Spider and Jumping Sumo at CES Las Vegas. Parrot increased its ownership in Pix4D to 57%. In May 2014 at the annual AUVSI conference in Orlando, Parrot announced the AR Drone 3.0, code-named Bebop, permitting YouTube personality Kyle Tarpley from the YouTube channel "AR Drone Show w/ Kyle Tarpley" to live-stream video the day before the conference opened. Parrot also revealed the option for a Skycontroller, when purchasing the Bebop. The Skycontroller allows the Bebop Drone to fly up to 2 kilometers. The Parrot Bebop Drone was scheduled for a December 2014 release and available in blue, red, and yellow.

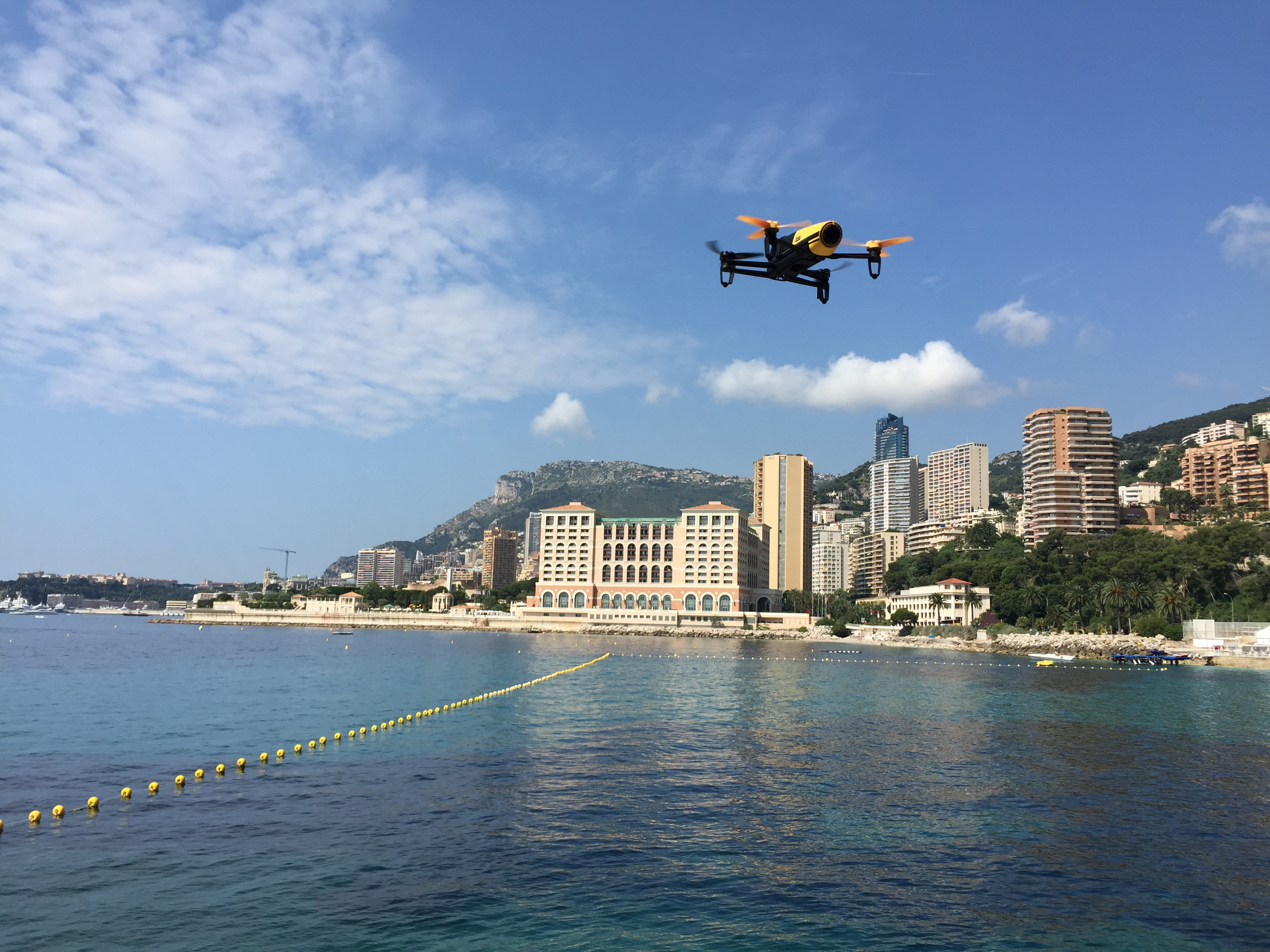
Leisure Drone flight

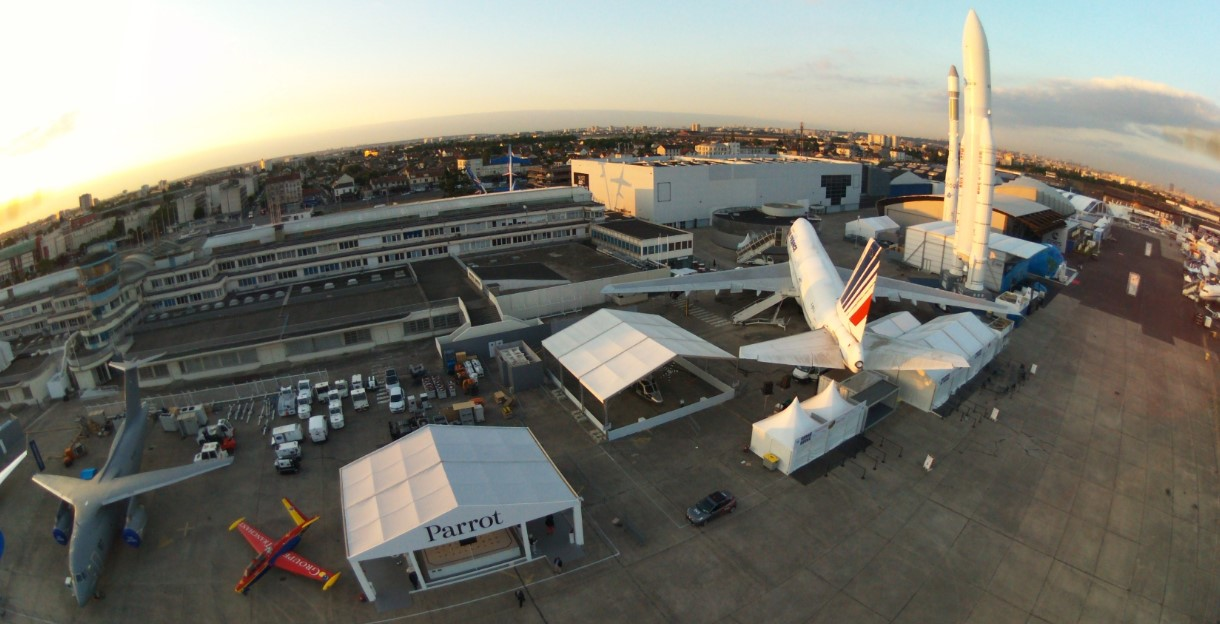
Aerial photo by Parrot drone over Le Bourget Air Show

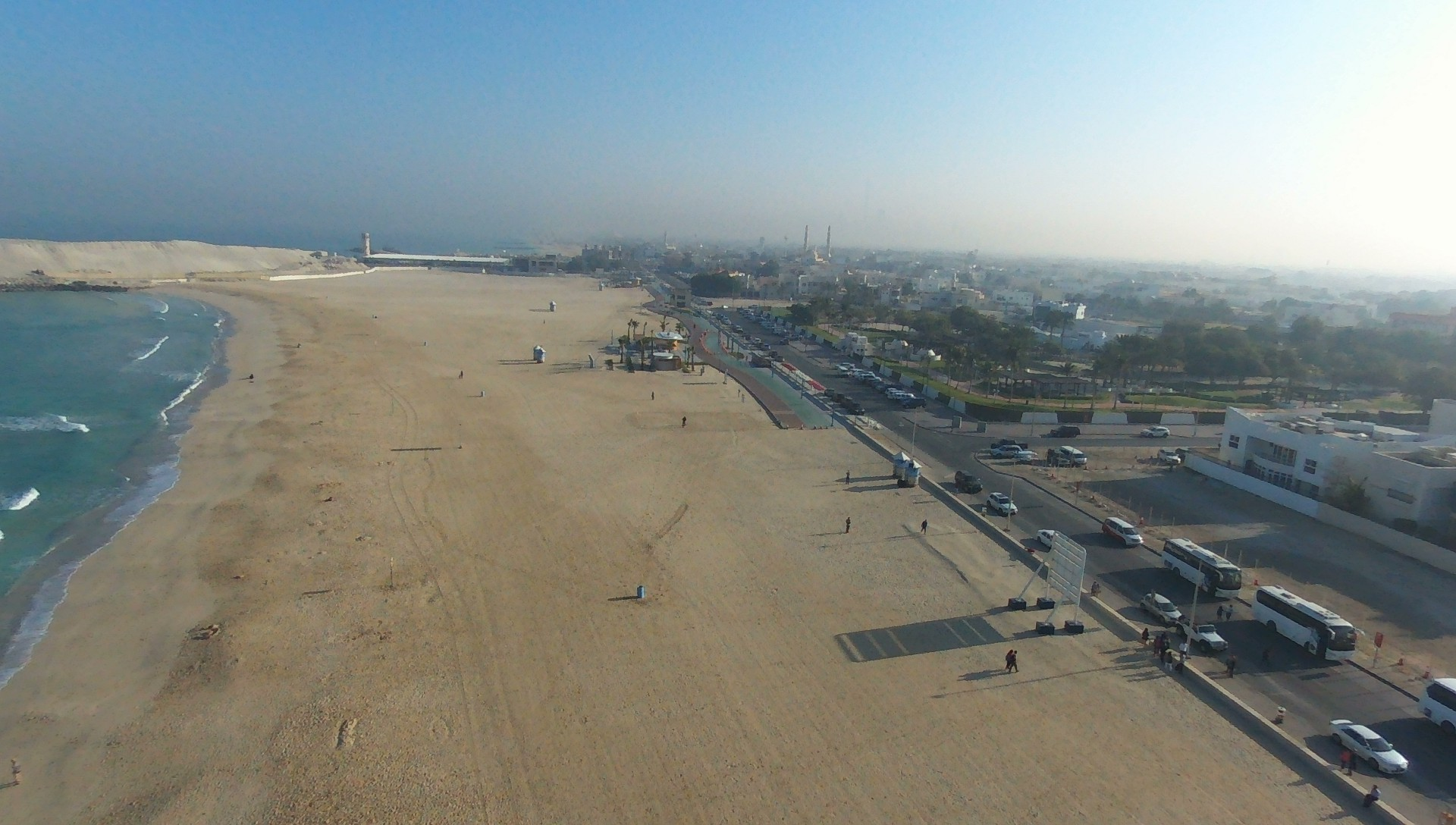
Bebop Drone flight over Dubai beach

At the January 2015 CES Las Vegas, Parrot unveiled the Parrot POT, a self-watering system for plants and Parrot Zik Sport.

In 2015, Parrot SA created two subsidiaries: Parrot Drones and Parrot Automotive.

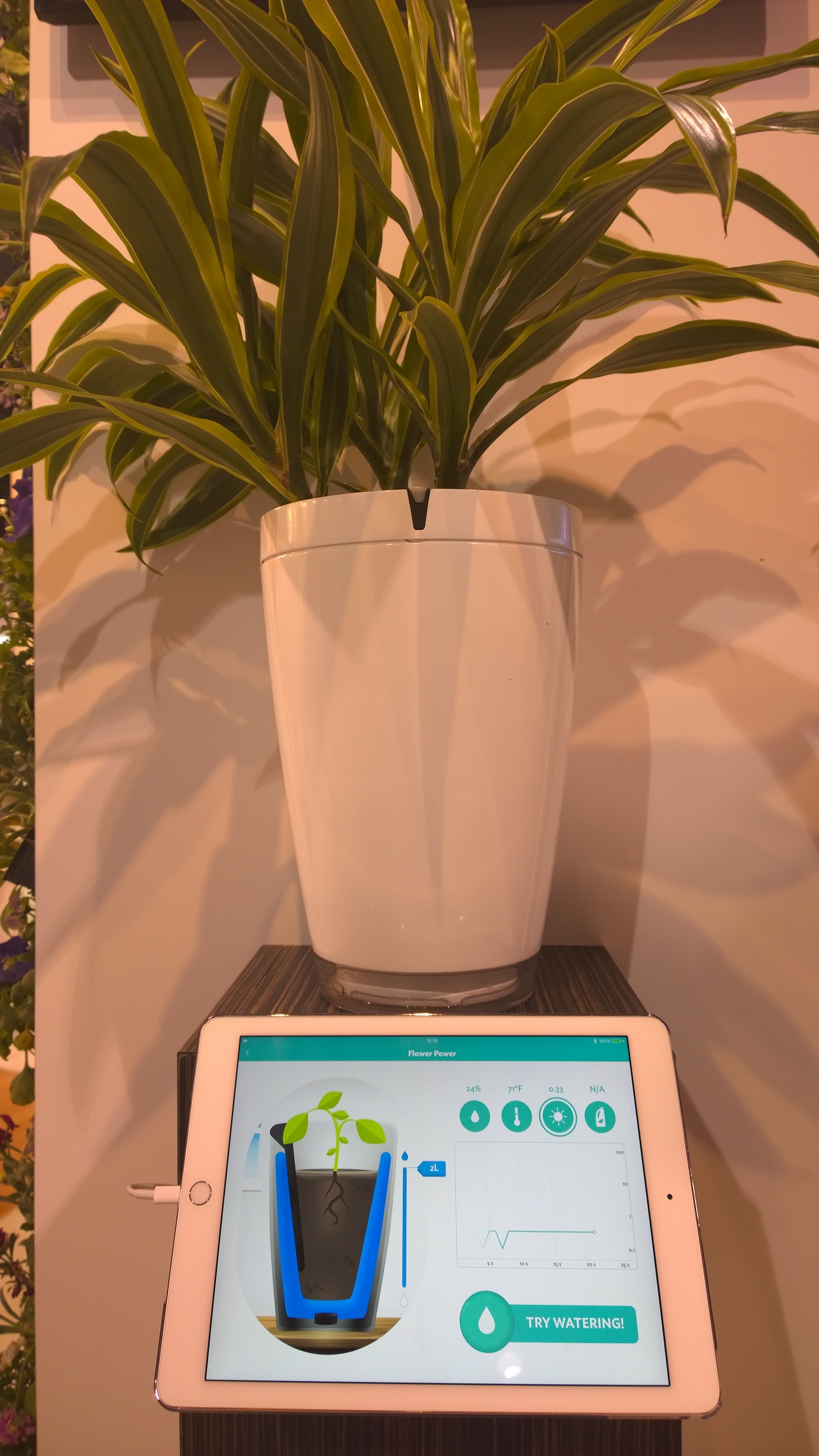
Parrot POT and Flower Power app

In San Francisco in November 2015, Parrot introduced the Bebop 2 drone.

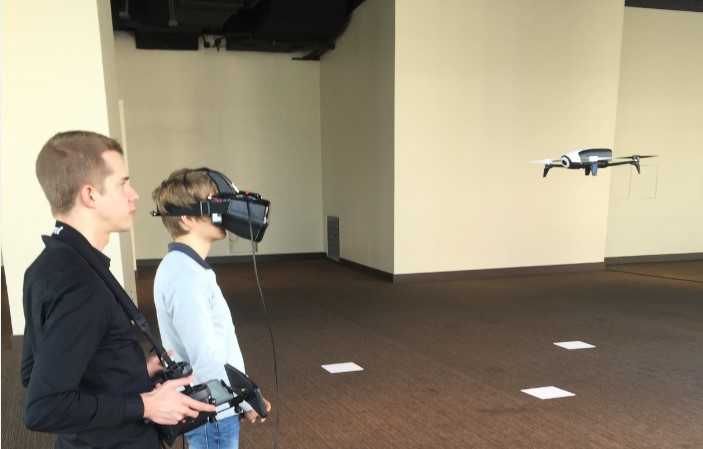
Drone piloted by Skycontroller and co-pilot with FPV glasses

Parrot purchased shares in 2015 in startups specialized in the drones industry: Airinov, EOS Innovation, Micasense and Iconem.

In 2016, Parrot SA released the Disco FPV, the world's first smart flying fixed-winged drone.

In January 2017, Parrot announced firing 290 of its 840 employees due to poor sales. The company then abandons its wireless and connected home devices to focus exclusively on drone manufacturing.

On 1 July 2018, Parrot released the Parrot Anafi folding drone with 4K HDR and 21 megapixel camera.

In May 2019, Parrot has been selected by U.S. military to win the contract for making reconnaissance drone and received $11 million from Department of Defense.

Development for this contract resulted in the ANAFI USA, a drone designed for security and defense applications. As of 2024, the model is used by military and governmental institutions in several NATO member states, as well as Japan.

In January 2021, Parrot sealed a deal with French army for 300 micro-drones.

On May 11, 2023, Parrot partnered with Tinamu, a spin-off of the Swiss Federal Institute of Technology (ETH). The collaboration involves integrating Tinamu's software with Parrot hardware to enable autonomous flight in indoor environments.

== Lobbying activities ==
=== At the National Assembly ===
Parrot Drones is registered as a lobbyist with the French National Assembly. The company reports that in 2015, its annual expenses for direct lobbying activities before Parliament ranged between €50,000 and €100,000.

=== At European Union Institutions ===
Parrot Drones has been listed in the EU Transparency Register since 2016 as an entity lobbying the European Commission. That year, it reported one full-time employee dedicated to lobbying activities and expenditures between €100,000 and €200,000.

== Legal case ==
In July 2024, the French Financial Markets Authority (Autorité des marchés financiers, AMF) fined Parrot and two of its executives, including Henri Seydoux, a total of €420,000. The penalty stemmed from the dissemination of false or misleading information in the company’s 2018 interim financial report.
