= DJI Phantom =

Chinese unmanned aerial vehicle

Phantom 精灵

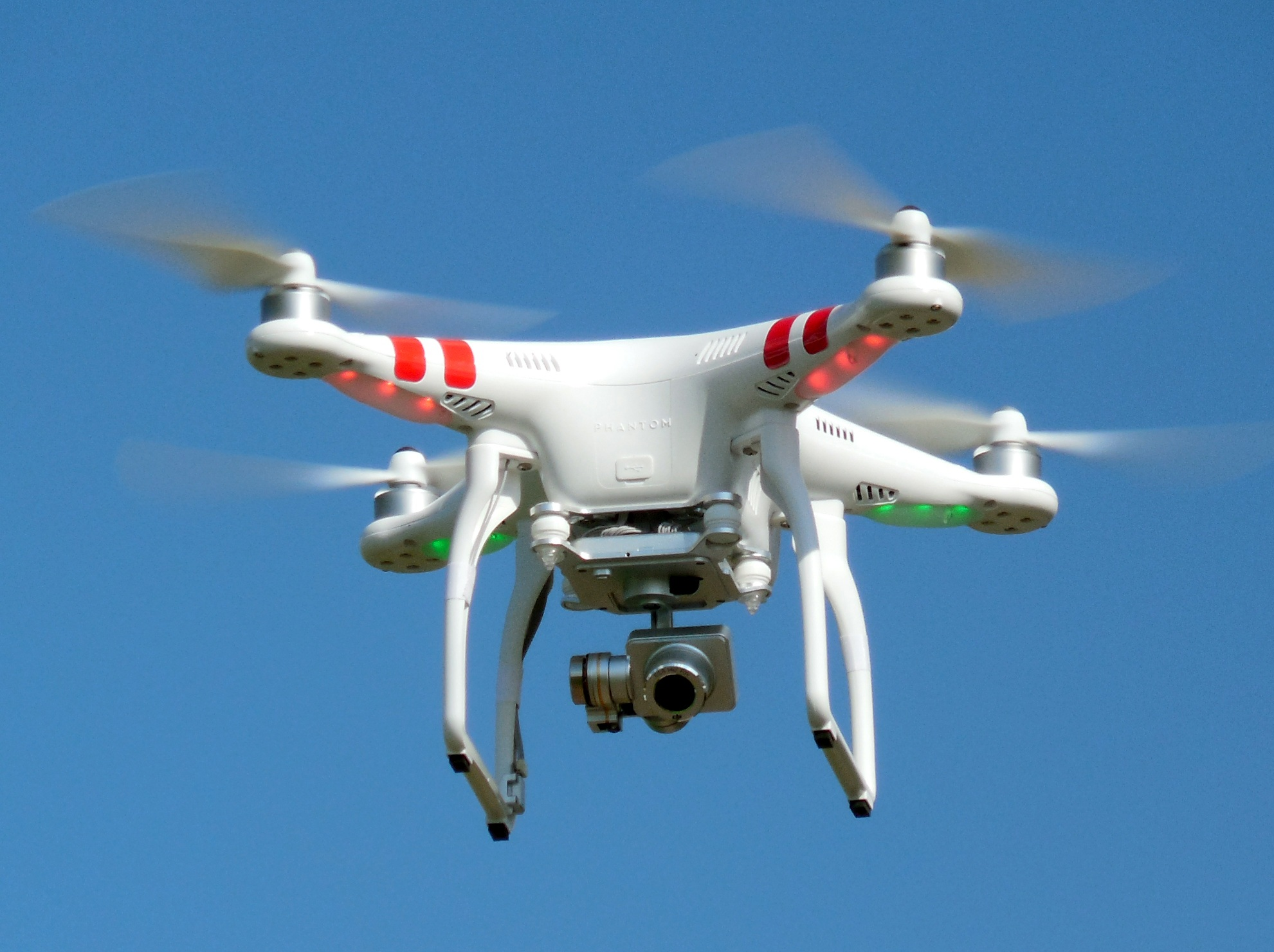
- Phantom 2 Vision+ in flight

General information
- Type: Unmanned aerial vehicle
- National origin: China
- Manufacturer: DJI

History
- Manufactured: 2013–c. 2023
- Introduction date: January 2013

The DJI Phantom (Chinese: 精灵; pinyin: Jīng Líng) is a series of quadcopter unmanned aerial vehicles (UAVs) developed by Chinese technology company DJI.

Released in 2013, the first Phantom was an entry-level drone with an affordable price and much more user-friendly experiences compared to other drones on the market at the time. The DJI Phantom was considered the first commercially successful recreational drone and one of the most influential drone design ever made. With its accessibility, it quickly captured the consumer drone market from hobbyists, professionals, and introduced the modern aerial photography drone form factor to the general public.

== Design and development ==
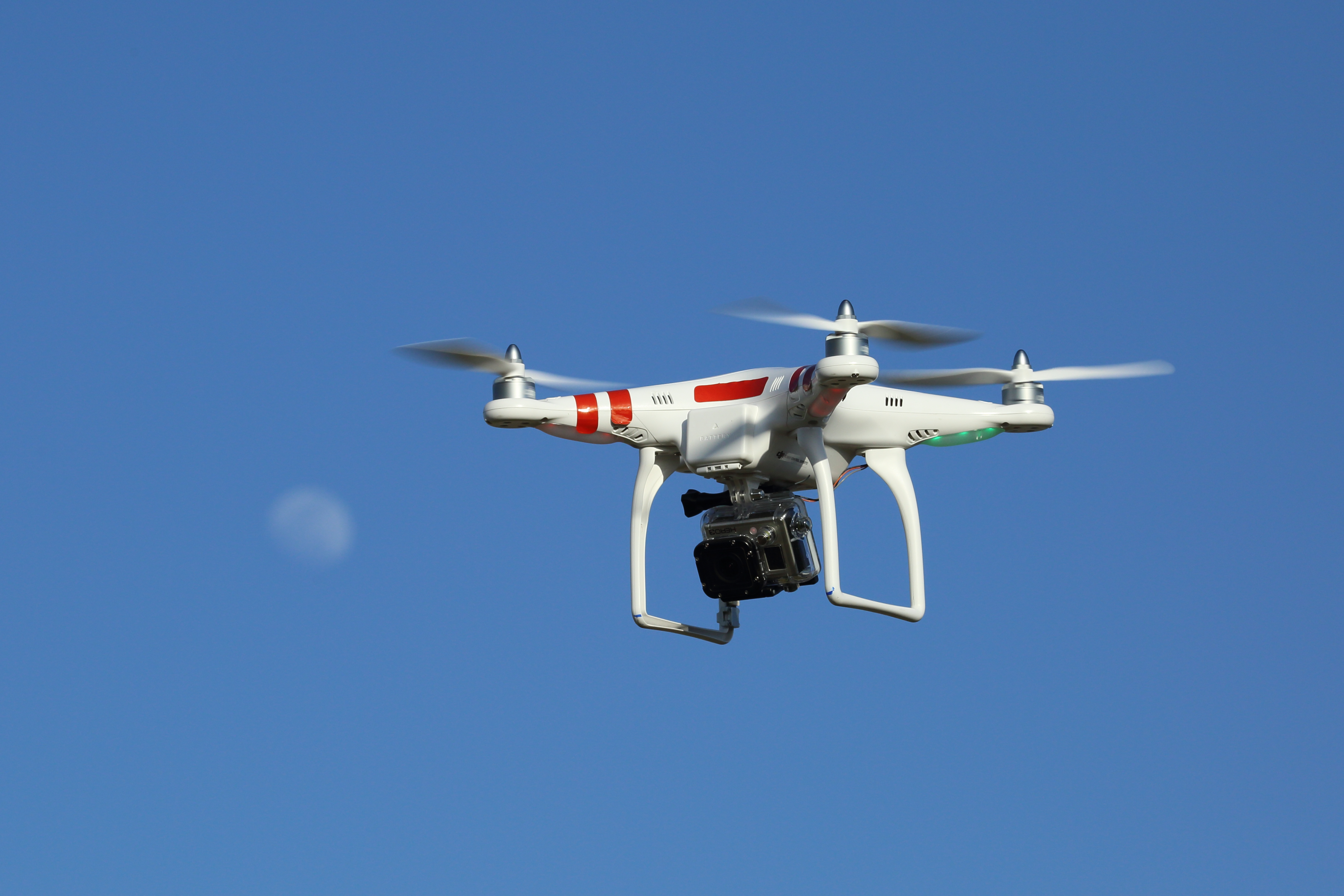
Phantom 1 with a GoPro HERO3 camera

=== Phantom 1 series ===
The Phantom 1, originally known as the Phantom, was released on January 7, 2013. It uses 2.4 GHz for control and is powered by a 2200 mAh LiPo battery, giving it a flight time of about 15 minutes. It did not include a built-in camera, but it can be fitted with an optional mount for a GoPro HERO camera. The drone uses a GPS-enabled NAZA-M autopilot system allowing it to hover with automatic wind resistance.

After the success of the Phantom 2 Vision, DJI released a camera-equipped version of the Phantom 1 as the Phantom FC40. The drone features a FC40 camera on a fixed mount capable of capturing 720p video at 30 FPS. The aircraft uses 5.8 GHz for control allowing the 2.4 GHz band to be allocated for FPV downlink. It uses an iOS/Android app for control and comes with Wi-Fi and GPS modules. Using a 2.4 GHz Wi-Fi connection, it provides almost real-time aerial video on a mobile device, allowing the pilot to capture images and videos as is. The camera angle is manually set before each flight.

=== Phantom 2 series ===
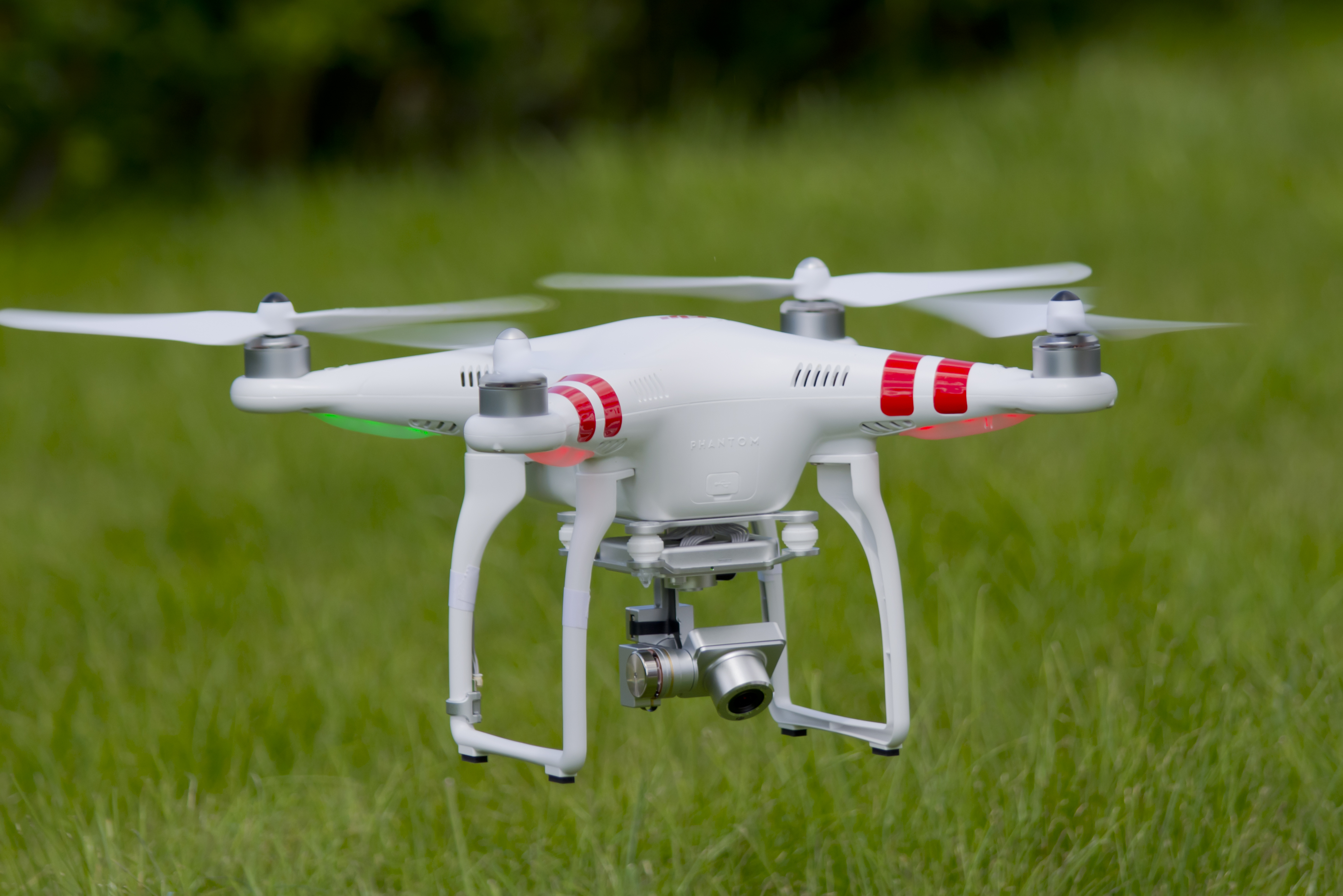
Stock Phantom 2 Vision+ V2.0

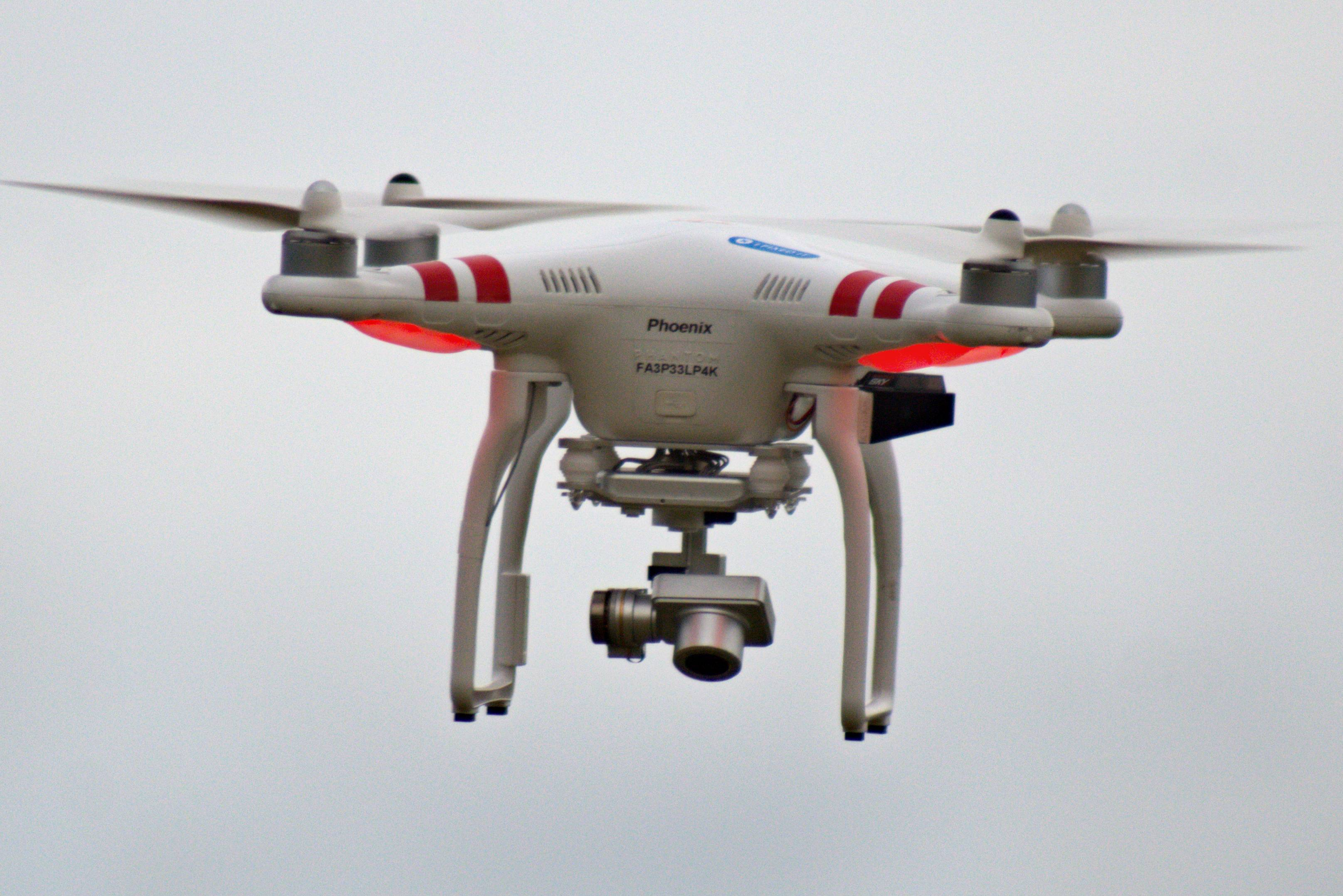
Modified Vision+ V2.0 with a Vision+ V3.0 compass module on the right landing leg and an external Remote ID module mounted on the base of the left leg.

Released in October 2013, the Phantom 2 Vision was the first model to feature a built-in camera. The camera is mounted on a one-dimensional gimbal and is capable of recording 1080p video at either 30 or 60 FPS or taking 14-megapixel stills onto a microSD card. The motorized gimbal gives the camera 60 degrees of vertical motion. The drone also features a Wi-Fi module, a GPS-enabled position holding, return-to-home capability, a Naza-M flight control system, and self-tightening propellers. The drone connects to iOS or Android devices via an app, allowing the operator to control the camera and view flight data. Battery capacity was increased to 5200 mAh, giving the drone a flight time of 25 minutes.

The Phantom 2 was released in December 2013 as a camera-less version of the Phantom 2 Vision. Although it did not include a built-in camera gimbal, an optional two-axis Zenmuse H3-2D gimbal was made available to mount a GoPro HERO3 camera.

Released in April 2014, the Phantom 2 Vision+ replaced the Vision's single-axis gimbal with a self-stabilizing three-axis unit. The gimbal mounts a redesigned camera with the same specifications as the Vision and has 90 degrees of vertical tilt, allowing the Vision+ to point the camera straight down. An upgraded version was released in late-2014 as the Phantom 2 Vision+ V3.0 with more powerful motors and electronic speed controllers (ESC), Model 9450 propellers, and an improved compass module.

=== Phantom 3 series ===
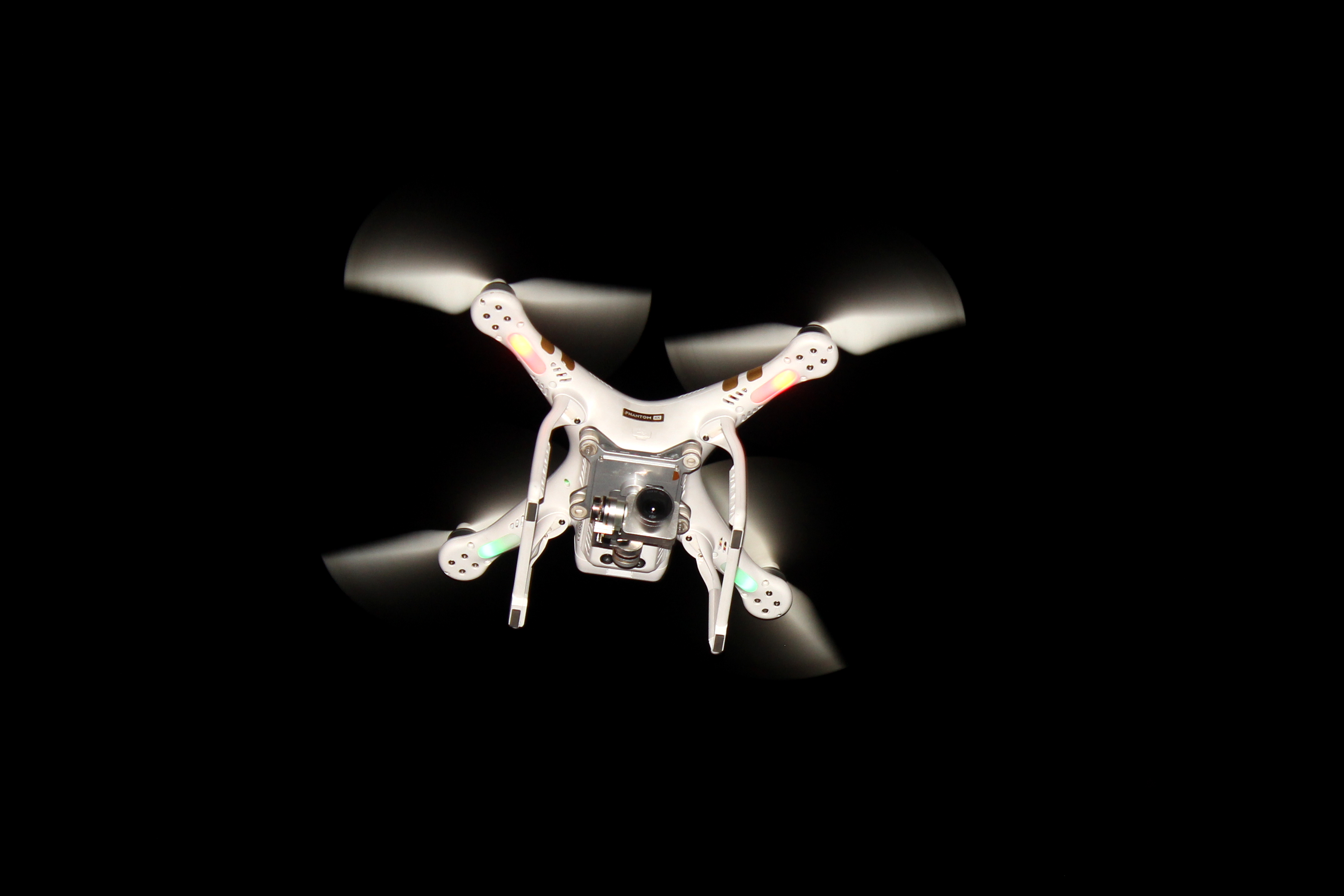
Phantom 3 4K drone in flight

In April 2015, DJI released the first two third-generation Phantom models; the Phantom 3 Professional and Phantom 3 Advanced. The Phantom 3 introduced a visual positioning system, allowing it to hold its position without GPS and improving positioning indoors and outdoors. The drone uses a Lightbridge video transmission system, allowing for stable connection up to 5km and replacing the Wi-Fi system of previous models, though range limitations vary by market. Both models feature a Sony Exmor 1/2.3" camera, with the Professional being capable of shooting 4K video at 30 FPS while the Advanced is limited to 2.7K video at 30 FPS. Both models are also capable of shooting 1080p video at 60 FPS, use GPS and GLONASS for navigation, and are powered by a 4480 mAh battery, giving them a flight time of approximately 23 minutes.

The Phantom 3 Standard was released in August 2015 as a cheaper alternative to the Advanced and Professional. Like the previous models, the Standard features a 1/2.3" camera, which is capable of shooting both 2.7K and 1080p video at 30 FPS as well as 720p video at 60 FPS. Unlike the other models, Standard retains the Wi-Fi transmission system and lacks the vision positioning system as well as GLONASS compatibility.

The Phantom 3 4K was released in January 2016. Similar to the Standard, the Phantom 3 4K is uses a Wi-Fi video transmission system, but is also fitted with the visual positioning system and 4K Sony Exmor camera of the Professional.

The Phantom 3 SE was originally released exclusively in China in early March 2017, though a worldwide release came in August of that year to select markets. An improved version of the Phantom 3 4K, the SE's video transmission system was upgraded to transmit live 720p video to the controller, up from the 4K's 480p live video. The drone's range was also increased from 1.2 km (0.75 mi) to 4 km (2.5 mi), though this is restricted in some markets. The SE uses the same 4480 mAh battery as previous models, though flight time was slightly increased to 25 minutes.

=== Phantom 4 series ===
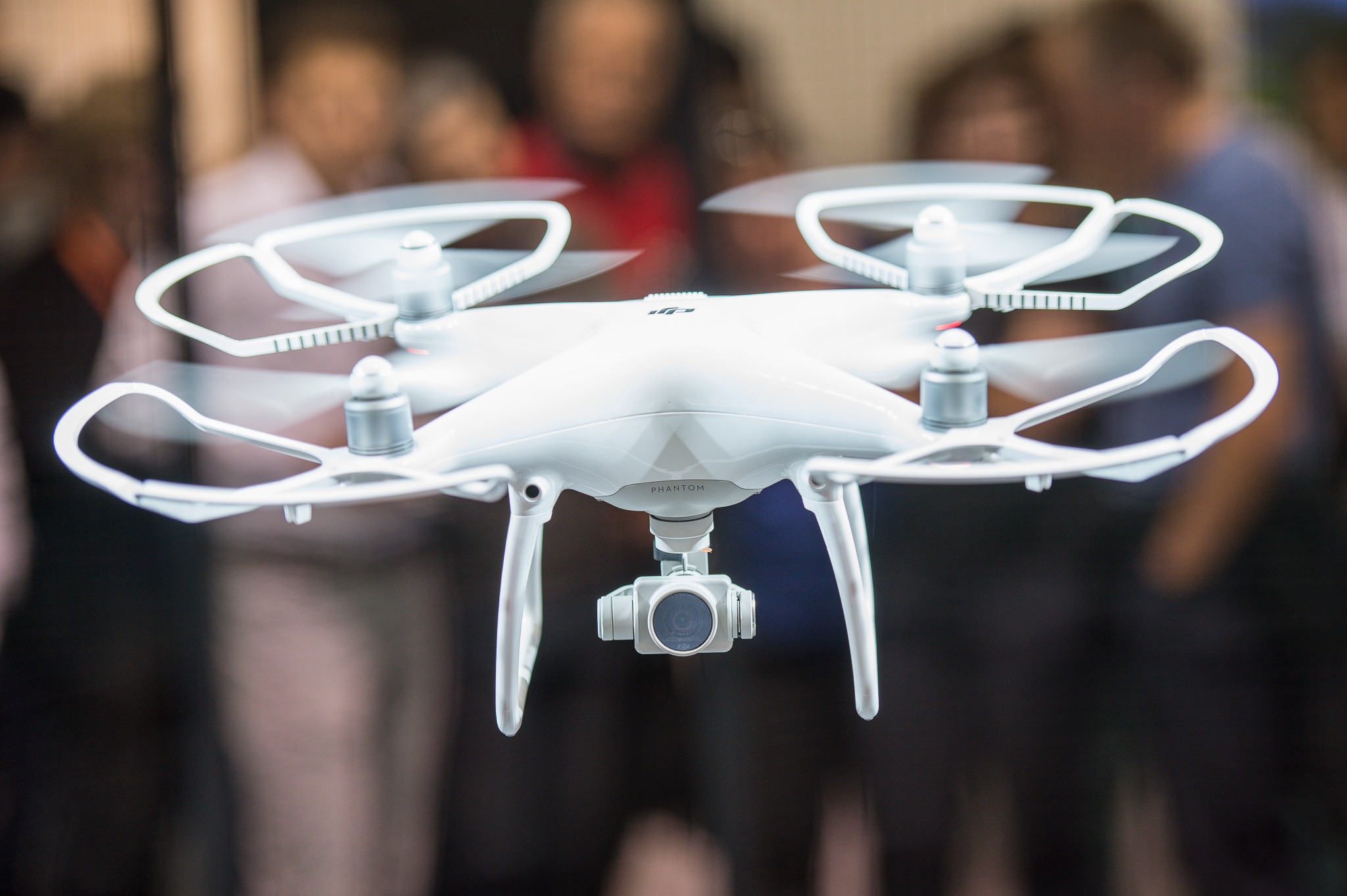
Phantom 4 with optional propeller guards attached

The Phantom 4, released in March 2016, introduced a new outer shell design as well as a push-and-release propeller locking mechanism. An obstacle avoidance system was added, which uses four cameras (two facing forward and two downward) and an ultrasonic sensor. The drone also introduced the ActiveTrack and TapFly features, with the former allowing the drone to autonomously track moving objects, including people, with its camera while the latter allowing the drone to be controlled by tapping on the video stream in the DJI app. The drone is equipped with a 1/2.3" camera with an electronic shutter capable of shooting 4K video at 30 FPS or 1080p video at 120 FPS, while a new 5350 mAh battery gives it a flight time of approximately 28 minutes.

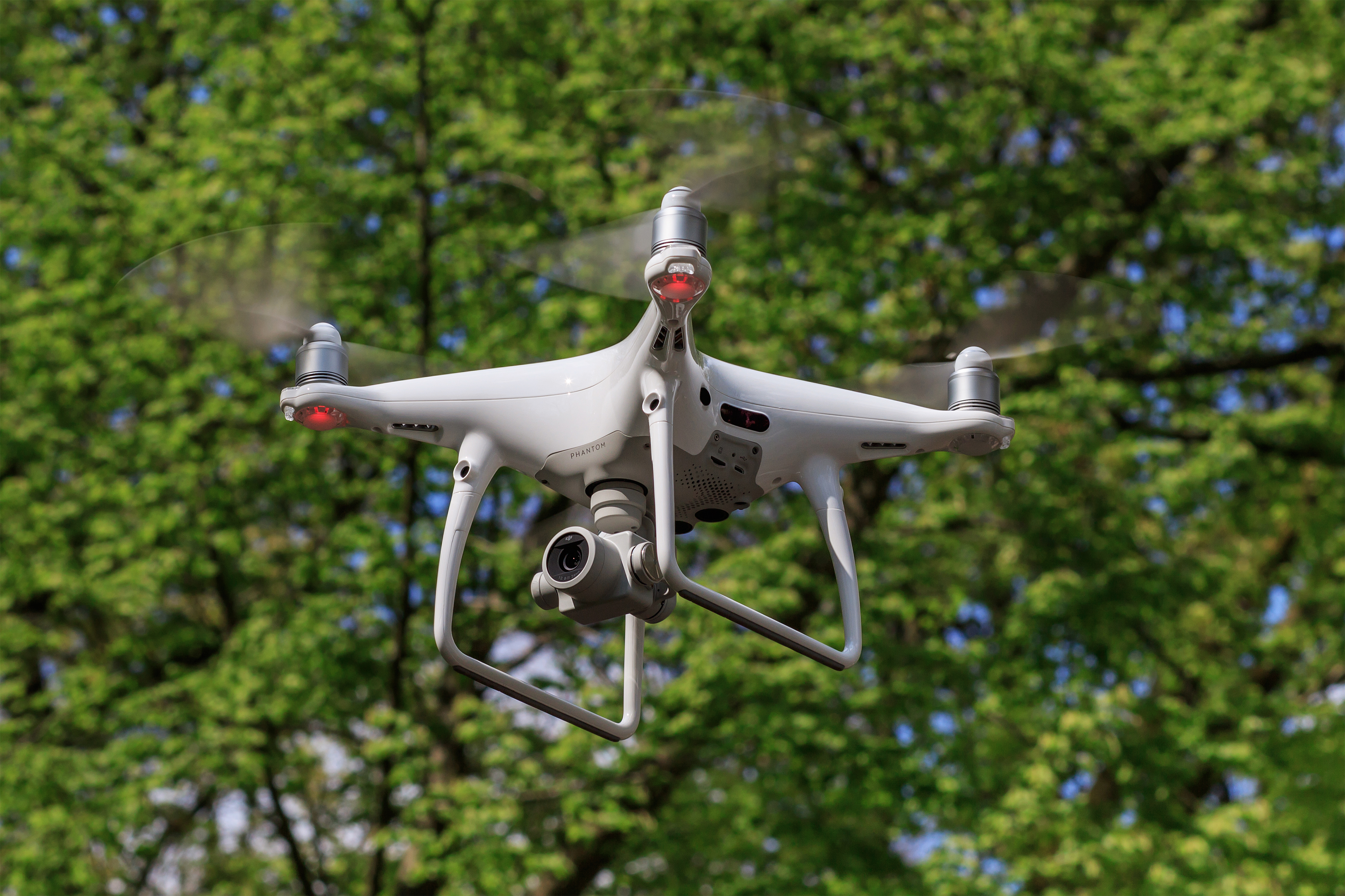
Phantom 4 Pro+ in flight

The Phantom 4 Pro was released in November 2016 with a new 20-megapixel Exmor R camera featuring a 1-inch (25 mm) CMOS sensor. The obstacle avoidance system was also upgraded rearward-facing sensors as well as infrared sensors on both sides. The Phantom 4 Pro+, offered alongside the Pro, features a controller with a 5.5-inch screen and an integrated flight app, allowing it to be flown without a separate mobile device. The Pro uses Model 9450S propellers and is powered by a 5870 mAh battery, giving it a fight time of approximately 30 minutes. During the 2017 IFA Berlin trade show, DJI announced a new version of the Pro/Pro+ as the Phantom 4 Pro Obsidian and Pro+ Obsidian, respectively. The Pro/Pro+ Obsidian is largely identical to the baseline Pro/Pro+, differing only in that both the drone and remote have a matte black color and that the camera and gimbal are made of magnesium and have an electroplated anti-fingerprint coating.

The Phantom 4 Advanced was announced on 13 April 2017 as a replacement for the Phantom 4. The drone features an upgraded camera with a 1-inch CMOS sensor and a mechanical shutter, capable of shooting 4K video at 60 FPS. The drone is capable of processing H.264 video at 60 FPS and H.265 video at 30 FPS. Like the Pro, the Advanced was also offered with a controller with a 5.5-inch screen as the Phantom 4 Advanced+.

In May 2018, DJI quietly released an upgraded version of the Phantom 4 Pro/Pro+ as the Phantom 4 Pro/Pro+ V2.0. The Pro V2.0 retains the camera of the Pro, but features an OcuSync transmission system, improved ESCs, and Model 9455S low-noise propellers which are backwards compatible with the original Pro. Production of the Phantom 4 Pro V2.0 was suspended in late 2018 or early 2019 due to what DJI called "a shortage of parts from a supplier", though DJI denied rumors that the Phantom was being discontinued. Production was restarted in January 2020 after the supply issue was sorted out.

Released in October 2018, the Phantom 4 RTK was designed for aerial mapping and surveying. Based on the Pro, the Phantom 4 RTK added a real-time kinematic (RTK) positioning module capable of connecting to GPS, GLONASS, Galileo, and BeiDou satellites. In addition to RTK, it uses a redundant GNSS module, installed to maintain flight stability in regions with poor signal. The drone is fitted with an FC6310R camera, which is identical to the Exmor R camera of the Phantom 4 Pro but with a glass lens instead a plastic one. The Phantom 4 RTK records images only in JPEG format and videos in MOV format.

An agricultural model of the Phantom 4 was announced on 25 September 2019 as the P4 Multispectral, dropping the Phantom name. Based on the Phantom 4 RTK, the P4 Multispectral integrates a six-sensor camera array, which includes an RGB camera and five narrow-band sensors, being the first drone to do so. The P4 Multispectral uses Model 9455S low-noise propellers as standard, though standard Phantom 4 propellers are also compatible at the cost of reduced performance. Battery capacity remained at 5870 mAh, but flight time was slightly reduced to approximately 27 minutes.

Details of a replacement for the Phantom 4 RTK were leaked in March 2022 as the Phantom 4 RTK SE. The leak did not reveal any significant changes between the RTK and RTK SE, but did note that the latter would not include an Intelligent Flight Battery charger and that the power cord wattage would be reduced from 160W to 100W. The Phantom 4 RTK SE was listed for sale on the DJI website as late as January 2023.

=== Phantom 5 rumors and replacement ===
In 2018, leaked photos of silver-colored Phantom drones circulated, with the drones speculated to be prototypes of a Phantom 5 variant. However, DJI denied that the photos were of Phantom 5 prototypes, stating that they were a one-off order for a customer. In April 2019, rumors circulated that the planned replacement for the Phantom 4 series, the Phantom 5, had been canceled, with the project manager being reassigned to another device. These rumors were also denied by DJI, with the company's communications director Adam Lisberg stating "As for the Phantom 5 rumors, we've never said we considered making a Phantom 5 in the first place, so there's nothing to cancel." Instead of continuing the Phantom series, DJI replaced the Phantom 4 Pro with the Mavic 3 Pro.

== Operational history ==
Example aerial video of Snowdonia filmed with a DJI Phantom 2 Vision+ quadcopter

The DJI Phantom series has been popular with hobbyists and enterprise users due to its functionality and price point. Phantom drones have been marketed at the Consumer Electronics Show (CES) for several years. The Phantom has been used for drone journalism, hurricane hunting, 3-D landscape mapping, nature protection, farming, search and rescue, aircraft inspection, tornado chasing, and lava lake exploration. The Fox Broadcasting Company also used Phantom 2 Vision+'s to promote 24 during San Diego Comic-Con in 2014.

The Phantom has been used by ISIS in Syria and Iraq to scout for battle planning and conduct aerial bombing by dropping small explosives on enemy troops, with at least one ISIS supporter posting instructions to a forum on how to operate the drone for military use. In the summer of 2014, ISIS shot footage of a Syrian airbase in Tabqa with a Phantom FC40. The People's Defense Units reportedly shot down several ISIS Phantoms in Kobani in December 2014.

Despite US sanctions on DJI, the FBI has continued to order the Phantom 4 Pro as late as 2021, citing in a procurement justification that "the DJI P4P is the only commercially available consumer sUAV to combine ease of use, high camera resolution and obstacle avoidance at an acceptable cost."

== Variants ==
=== Phantom 1 ===
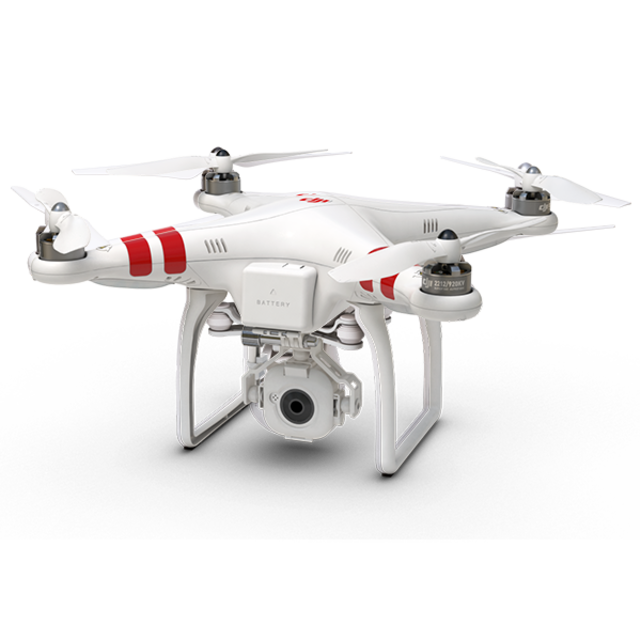
Phantom FC40

Phantom
Later Phantom 1, company designation Model P330. Original variant with a NAZA-M autopilot system, 2.4 GHz control frequency, and a 2200 mAh battery giving it a flight time of approximately 15 minutes. Released on January 7, 2013.
Phantom FC40
Company designation Model P330D. As the Phantom but with 5.8 GHz control frequency and a built-in FC40 camera mounted on a ground-adjustable gimbal.

=== Phantom 2 ===
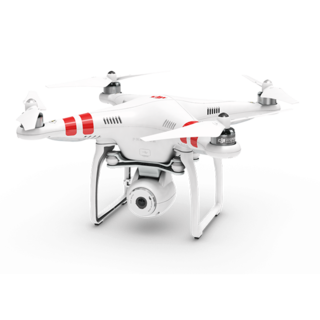
Phantom 2 Vision

Phantom 2 Vision
Original Phantom 2 variant with a camera mounted on a one-axis gimbal 60 degrees of vertical motion and a 5200 mAh battery giving it a flight time of 25 minutes. Released in October 2013.
Phantom 2
Company designation Model P330Z. As Phantom 2 Vision but with the camera and gimbal removed. A removable two-axis Zenmuse H3-2D gimbal was available as an option, capable of mounting a GoPro HERO3 camera. Released in December 2013.
Phantom 2 Vision+
Also known as the Phantom 2 Vision+ V2.0, company designation Model PV331. As Phantom 2 Vision but with a redesigned camera mounted on a self-stabilizing three-axis gimbal with 90 degrees of vertical motion. Released in April 2014.
Phantom 2 Vision+ V3.0
Upgraded Phantom 2 Vision+ with more powerful motors and electronic speed controllers (ESC), Model 9450 propellers, and an improved compass module. Released in late-2014.

=== Phantom 3 ===
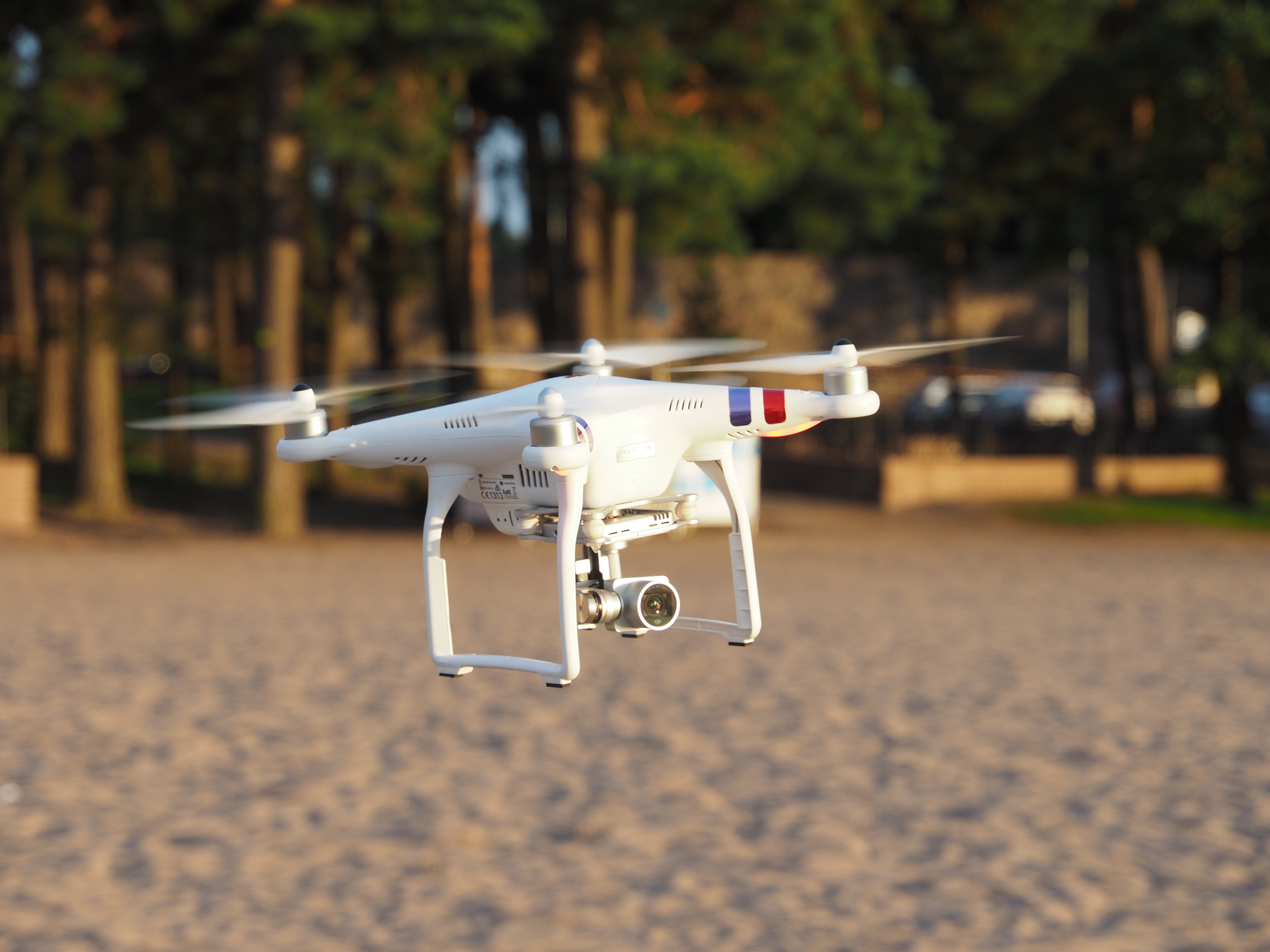
Phantom 3 Advanced

Phantom 3 Advanced
Company designation Model W322, W322A, and W322B. First Phantom 3 variant with a Sony Exmor 1/2.3" camera limited to 2.7K video at 30 FPS, a visual positioning system, a Lightbridge video transmission system, GPS and GLONASS navigation, and a 4480 mAh battery giving it a flight time of approximately 23 minutes. Released alongside the Professional in April 2015.
Phantom 3 Professional
Company designation Model W323, W323A, and W323B. As Phantom 3 Advanced but with Sony Exmor 1/2.3" camera capable of shooting 4K video at 30 FPS. Released alongside the Advanced in April 2015.
Phantom 3 Standard
Company designation Model W321. As Advanced/Professional but with a Wi-Fi video transmission system, the camera limited to 2.7K and 1080p video at 30 FPS, and without the vision positioning system or GLONASS compatibility. Released in August 2015.
Phantom 3 4K
Company designation Model W325. As Phantom 3 Standard but with the visual positioning system and 4K Sony Exmor camera of the Professional. Released in January 2016.
Phantom 3 SE
Company designation Model W328. As Phantom 3 4K but with an upgraded video transmission system, increased range, and a flight time of 25 minutes. Released in China in March 2017 and worldwide in August 2017.

=== Phantom 4 ===
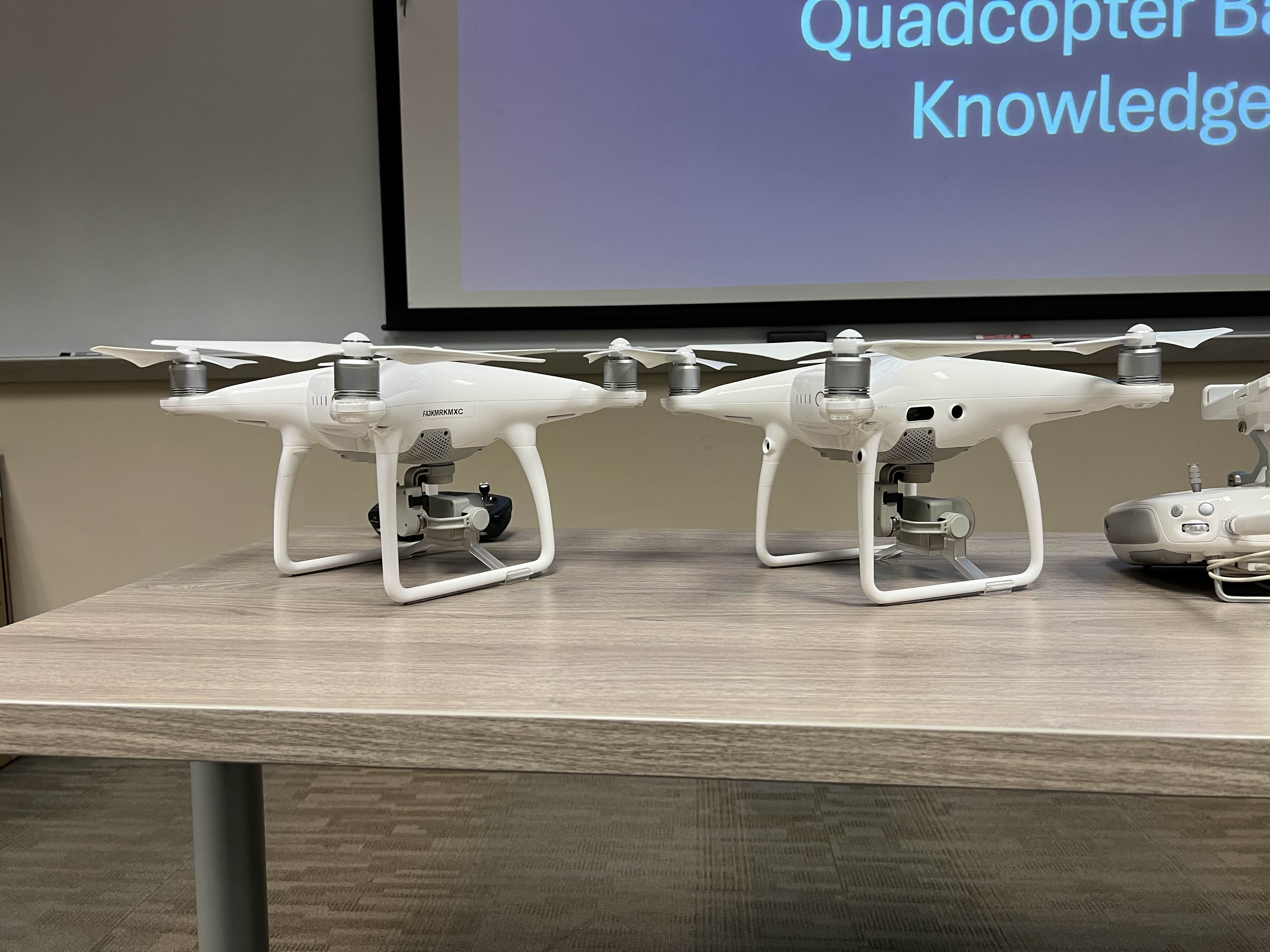
Rear quarter view of a Phantom 4 (left) and Phantom 4 Pro (right). Apparent are the side and rear obstacle avoidance sensors on the Pro. These sensors are absent on the original Phantom 4, with this drone using the space for a Part 107 registration.

Phantom 4
Company designation Model WM330A. Redesigned variant with a new outer shell, push-and-release propellers, an obstacle avoidance system with four forward/downward-facing cameras and an ultrasonic sensor, a 4K 1/2.3" camera with an electronic shutter, and a 5350 mAh battery giving it a flight time of approximately 28 minutes. Released in March 2016.
Phantom 4 Pro/Pro+
Company designation Model WM331A. As Phantom 4 but with a 20-megapixel 1" Exmor R camera, an upgraded obstacle avoidance system with rearward-facing cameras and infrared side sensors, Model 9450S propellers, and a 5870 mAh battery giving it a fight time of approximately 30 minutes. The Pro+ differs from the Pro in that it has a controller with a built-in 5.5" screen and integrated flight app. Released in November 2016.
Phantom 4 Pro/Pro+ Obsidian
As Phantom 4 Pro/Pro+ but with a matte black color and a magnesium camera/gimbal with an electroplated anti-fingerprint coating. Announced at the 2017 IFA Berlin trade show.
Phantom 4 Pro/Pro+ V2.0
Company designation Model WM331S. Upgraded Phantom 4 Pro/Pro+ with an OcuSync transmission system, improved ESCs, and backwards compatible Model 9455S low-noise propellers. Released in May 2018.
Phantom 4 Advanced/Advanced+
Company designation Model WM332A. Replacement for the Phantom 4 with a mechanical shutter capable of shooting 4K H.264 video at 60 FPS and H.265 video at 30 FPS. The Advanced+ differs from the Advanced in that it has a controller with a built-in 5.5" screen and integrated flight app. Announced on 13 April 2017.
Phantom 4 RTK
Company designation Model WM334R. Variant of the Phantom 4 Pro designed for aerial mapping and surveying with an FC6310R camera, a redundant GNSS module, and a real-time kinematic positioning module compatible to GPS, GLONASS, Galileo, and BeiDou satellites. Released in October 2018.
Phantom 4 RTK SE
Variant to replace the Phantom 4 RTK. Details of the RTK SE were leaked in March 2022.
P4 Multispectral
Company designation Model WM336. Agricultural variant of the Phantom 4 RTK with a flight time of 27 minutes, Model 9455S low-noise propellers, and a six-sensor camera array with an RGB camera and five narrow-band sensors. Announced on 25 September 2019.

== Operators ==
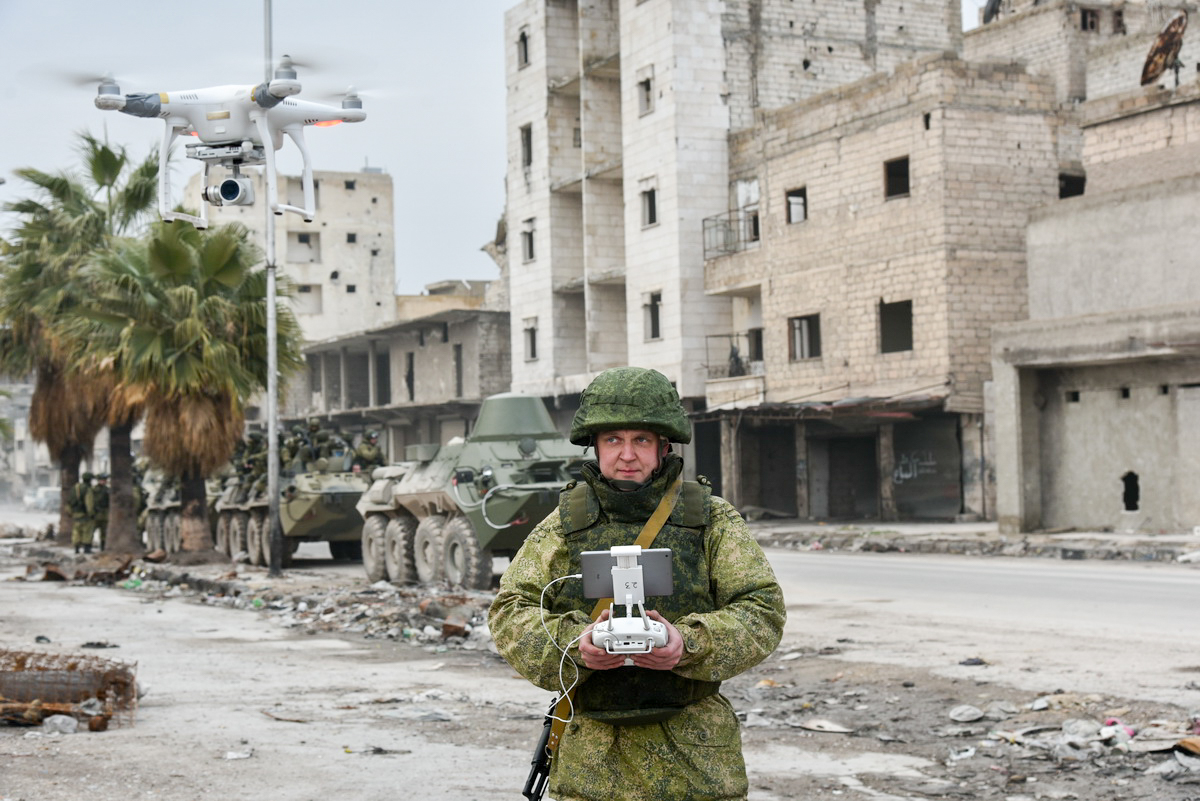
Russian sapper of the International Mine Action Center using a Phantom 3 in Syria.

=== Government operators ===
United States

- Federal Bureau of Investigation bought 19 Phantom 4 Pro V2.0 drones in July 2021.
- United States Secret Service bought a total of eight Phantom 4 Pro and Mavic 2 Pro drones in July 2021.

=== Military operators ===
Argentina

- Argentine Army introduced the Phantom 4 in 2019.

Australia

- Australian Army introduced the Phantom 4 in August 2018. As of 2019, 350 Phantoms were in service.

Brazil

- Brazilian Army introduced the Phantom 3 in 2015.

Chile

- Chilean Army introduced the Phantom 3 SE in 2018.

Germany

- Sea Battalion introduced the Phantom in 2016, with 30 in service as of 2019.

Israel

- Israeli Ground Forces introduced the Phantom in 2017.

Lithuania

- Lithuanian Land Forces introduced the Phantom 4 in 2017.

New Zealand

- New Zealand Army introduced the Phantom in 2017.

Russia

- Russian Ground Forces introduced the Phantom in 2019, with 10 in service as of that year.

Sri Lanka

- Sri Lanka Army introduced the Phantom 4 in 2016, with two in service with the 15th Unmanned Aerial Vehicle Regiment for training as of 2019.

Uruguay

- National Army introduced the Phantom in 2017, with 22 in service as of 2019 for emergency response operations.

=== Non-state operators ===
Ukraine

- The Phantom was in Ukrainian paramilitary service as of 2019.

ISIS

- The Phantom has allegedly been used for scouting and aerial bombing.

== Accidents and incidents ==
26 January 2015
A Phantom FC40 crashed into a tree on the South Lawn near the White House in the early morning. US President Barack Obama and First Lady Michelle Obama were in India at the time of the incident, though both of their daughters were at the White House. The pilot was identified as Shawn Usman, a scientist of the National Geospatial-Intelligence Agency who was flying the drone recreationally at around 3 a.m. when he lost control of it. Usman told Secret Service investigators that he had been drinking shortly before he lost control, and that he had gone to bed shortly thereafter, only contacting the authorities later in the morning after friends notified him of news reports of the incident. The drone was not detected by the White House's radar system due to its size, but was seen by Secret Service officers who were unable to bring it down. Investigators concluded that the incident was unintentional and Usman was not charged with a crime, though the Federal Aviation Administration reviewed the incident for a possible administrative action. In response to the incident, DJI released a firmware update for the Phantom 2 family to prevent them from flying within 25 km (16 mi) of Washington, D.C., centered around the Washington Monument. Aviation had been heavily restricted within 10 nmi (19 km) of Ronald Reagan Washington National Airport since the September 11 attacks, though Usman stated that he was unaware that the restrictions also applied to small drones.

18 February 2016
A recreational drone pilot crashed their drone, a Phantom, during a ceremony at the Australian War Memorial in Canberra. No one was injured. The drone reportedly landed near the Memorial's Director and former defence minister Brendan Nelson, who picked it up and subsequently handed it to security staff. Following a Civil Aviation Safety Authority (CASA) investigation, the pilot was fined $900, which, according to a CASA spokesman, closed the matter.

11 June 2016
Stephanie Creignou was attending a 5K run in Beloeil, Quebec when a Phantom 3 fell and hit her on the head. She was taken to hospital, where she was diagnosed with whiplash. As of 22 June, she was still out of work and had to cancel a holiday with her husband. Rosaire Turcotte, who operated the UAV that crashed, said he couldn't understand how it happened and that he'd acted safely. The incident was caught by a camera on a different UAV, one owned by VTOL-X Drones, a company hired to cover the event. VTOL-X CEO Flavio Martenkowski said he had spoken to Turcotte about the danger of flying so near to a crowd just before the crash. The Transportation Safety Board of Canada opened an investigation into the crash.

21 September 2017
A civilian Phantom 4 collided with a UH-60 Black Hawk helicopter in the evening over the eastern shore of Staten Island, New York City, United States. The helicopter was one of two with the 82nd Airborne Division flying out of Fort Bragg on duty for the United Nations General Assembly. The helicopters were able to continue flying and landed at Linden Airport. Nobody was hurt, but part of the UAV was found at the bottom of the main rotor system. In December 2017, the National Transportation Safety Board issued an accident report into the collision, finding the pilot of the UAV at fault. The UAV operator deliberately flew the UAV 2.5 miles away from himself and was unaware of the helicopters' presence. The operator did not know of the collision until contacted by the NTSB and when interviewed by them showed only a general cursory awareness of the regulations. There was also a temporary flight restriction in place, from which the Black Hawk (but not the UAV) was exempt. UAVs are prohibited from flying beyond the pilot's line of sight under FAA regulations.

== Aircraft on display ==
A Phantom 1 is on display at the National Air and Space Museum in Washington, D.C. The drone was formerly owned and operated by Bard College and was donated to the museum in 2015.

== Specifications (Phantom 4 Pro V2.0) ==
Data from DJI Phantom 4 Pro V2.0 user manual

General characteristics

- Width: 0.350 m (1 ft 2 in) diagonal
- Empty weight: 1.375 kg (3 lb)
- Battery capacity: 5870 mAh
- Propellers: 2-bladed Model 9455S low-noise propellers

Performance

- Maximum speed: 72 km/h (45 mph, 39 kn)
- Endurance: ≈30 minutes
- Service ceiling: 6,000 m (19,685 ft)
- Rate of climb: 6.0 m/s (1,182 ft/min)

Avionics

- Camera:

- 20MP Sony Exmor R with 1" CMOS sensor

- GNSS compatibility:

- GPS
- GLONASS

- Transmission system: OcuSync

== See also ==
- Delivery drone
- Miniature UAV
- History of unmanned aerial vehicles

Aircraft of comparable role, configuration, and era

- DJI Mavic
- Parrot AR.Drone

Related lists

- List of unmanned aerial vehicles
