= Regulation of unmanned aerial vehicles =

Regulation of unmanned aerial vehicles (UAVs) involves setting safety requirements, outlining regulations for the safe flying of drones, and enforcing action against errant users.

The use of unmanned aerial vehicles or drones, is generally regulated by the civil aviation authority of the country. The International Civil Aviation Organization (ICAO) began exploring the use of drone technology in 2005, which resulted in a 2011 report. Ireland was the first country to set a national framework aided by the report and larger aviation bodies such as the FAA and the EASA quickly followed suit, which eventually led to influential regulations in the United States and Europe. As of January 2022, several countries are working on new regulations, ranging from BVLOS (beyond visual line of sight, or BLOS) operations to unmanned traffic management (UTM) activities, which include the United States, the Europe Union, India, South Korea, Japan, and Australia among others.

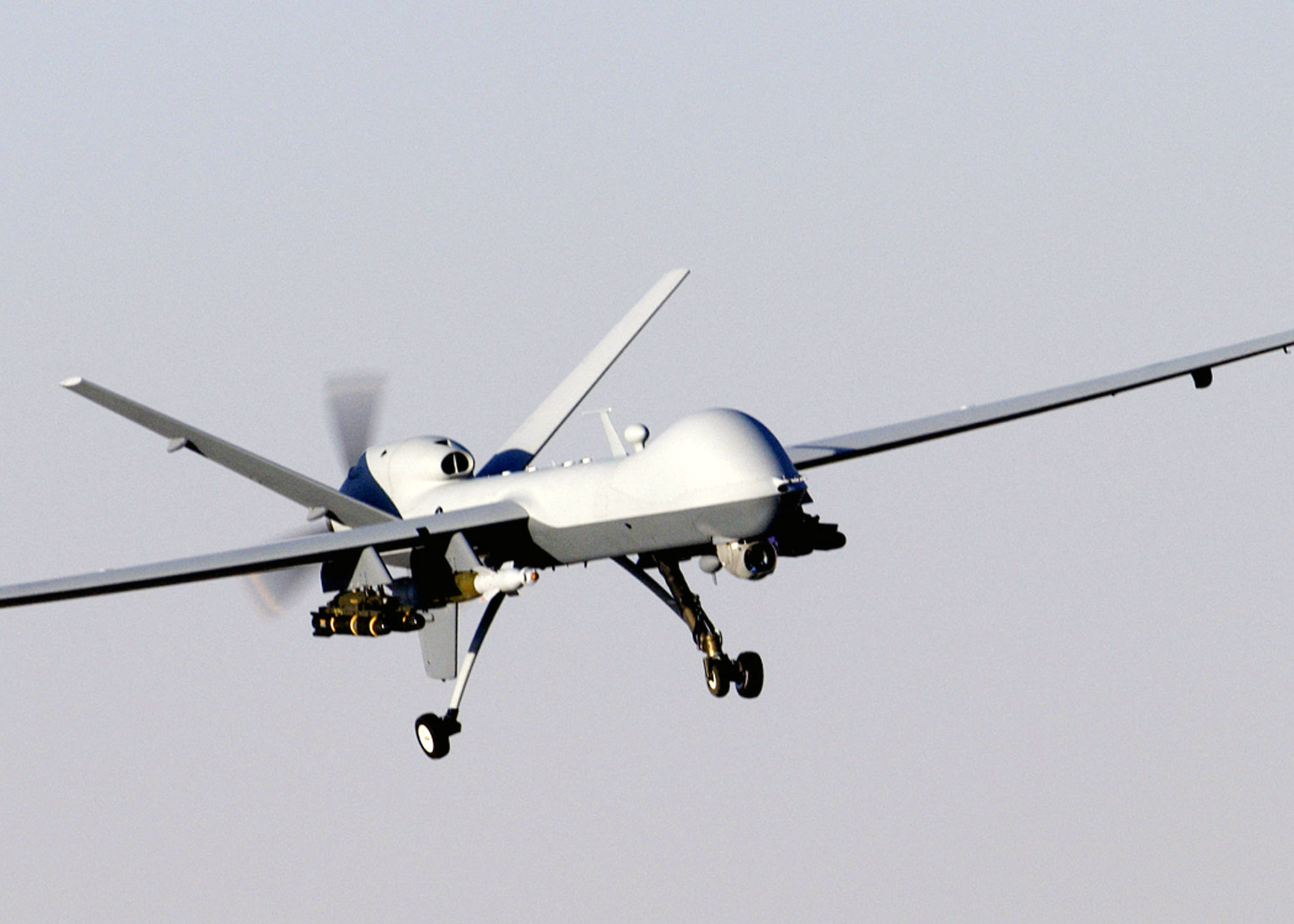
MQ-9 Reaper in flight (2007)

== Certification aspects ==
Rapid full-scale progression of these unmanned aircraft has major concern for safety. Certification agencies attempt to keep up with the demands of the fast-growing industry, certification standards for manned aircraft are starting to apply. For the electronics that provide communication and control of the systems, this means a move towards compliance with DO-178C and DO-254 for software and hardware development.

In most cases, unmanned aircraft (UA) can only be operated as part of a system, hence the term “unmanned aircraft system” (UAS). The UAS consists of an UA, a remote pilot station, and the command, control, and communications links that join them; safety considerations address all of these elements.

In 2011, the International Civil Aviation Organization (ICAO) of the United Nations published Circular 328, which states that a UAS should demonstrate equivalent levels of safety as manned aircraft and thus meet relevant government rules for flight and flight equipment. The ICAO further distinguishes between autonomous aircraft and remotely-piloted aircraft (RPA), and anticipates that only RPA "will be able to integrate into the international civil aviation system in the foreseeable future".

2021 was an influential year for drone regulation for the drone industry given the regulations that would enter into force. Starting on December 31, 2020, the unmanned aircraft regulation in the European Union whereby the first step for a drone operator/ remote pilot would be to register in the country in which they live, or have their main place of business. EASA also issued guidelines for the management of drone incidents at airports, and new rules for air traffic management. Meanwhile, the FAA announced new rules for remote identification and operations over people.

== By country or region ==
The European Union sees benefits and challenges for civilian drones, and in 2014 proposed a set of regulations to control the effects of drones on peoples' safety, security, and privacy.

Unmanned Aircraft Systems (UAS) Advisory Group was set up in 2015 by the United Nations’ civil aviation arm to draw up global rules and regulations for the safe use of unmanned aircraft. The team comprises countries such as the United States, France and China, as well as industry bodies like the global pilots' association.

In December 2017, the International Air Transport Association (IATA), a global airline trade body urged governments to enforce regulations aimed at curbing the reckless and hazardous operation of recreational drones.

=== Summary ===
Country	Recreational use		Commercial use		Source
Country	Limit w/o registration	Limit w/ registration, but w/o authorization	Limit w/o registration	Limit w/ registration, but w/o authorization	Source
Argentina	500g	10kg	?	?	
Belize	Prohibited		Commercial permit required		
Brazil	250g	25kg	250g	25kg	
Chad	No limit		Commercial permit required		
Colombia	250g	25kg	250g	25kg	
Costa Rica	25kg	No limit	Commercial permit required		
El Salvador	Registration always required	25kg	Commercial permit required		
Greenland	7 kg	7/25 kg	7 kg	7/25 kg	
Honduras	250g	25kg	?	?	
Indonesia	2kg	2kg	Commercial permit required		
Japan	100g		Commercial permit required		
Madagascar	Prohibited		Commercial permit required		
Malaysia	Permit required		Commercial permit required		
Mongolia	15kg	25kg	Commercial permit required		
Morocco	Prohibited		Commercial permit required		
New Zealand	25kg				
Nicaragua	Prohibited		Prohibited		
Pakistan	Registration always required	10kg	Registration always required	10kg	

=== Australia ===
In 2013, a Civil Aviation Safety Authority (CASA) spokesman said that "those operating remotely piloted aircraft should keep them at least 30 m (98 ft) away from structures, buildings, and people, and to check with the local council where they could be used."

CASA regulations require that UAVs be at least 30 m (98 ft) from people and should not be operated in a way that creates a hazard.

=== Brazil ===
In 2017, the National Civil Aviation Agency regulated the operation of drones through the Brazilian Special Civil Aviation Regulation No. 94/2017 (RBAC-E No. 94/2017). ANAC's regulation complements the drone operating rules established by the Airspace Control Department (DECEA) and the National Telecommunications Agency (ANATEL).

=== Canada ===
In 2016, Transport Canada proposed the implementation of new regulations that would require all drones over 250 grams (8.8 oz) to be registered, insured, and that operators would be required to be a minimum age and pass an exam in order to get a license. The regulations were introduced in 2019.

=== France ===
Overflights of nuclear power plants are illegal in France, with a punishment of a year in prison and a fine of €75,000 if an aircraft comes within 5 km horizontally or 1 km vertically of a plant.

=== European Union, including Switzerland ===
The European Union's regulations classify drone operations in three categories:

- Open
- Special: operations overstepping the rules of the previous category
- Certified: the risks involved in operating the vehicle are exceptionally high

Switzerland, as part of EASA, employs the European Union rules.

=== Germany ===
In recent days, Germany's air defense regarding drones specifically has been called into question. Whether or not it is up to the military or specific states to deal with drone issues in no fly zones. According to Verena Jackson who is a lawyers at Bundeswehr University in Munich, the military shooting down drones domestically "would not be legally possible." This is because the German Constitution makes it very clear that the military, known as the Bundeswehr, is only for protection against foreign attact. Shooting down drones inside the country would be a violation of the Constitution and as such the question now arrises of whose responbility it is to take care of this issue after multiple flights were grounded at Munish airport after drones were in the way and in violation of the no fly zone surrounding the airport.

Typically, the different state police forces are responsible for responding to and or handling drone response issues. The exception to that is at airports and train stations which is handled by the Federal Police in Germany, the Bundespolizei. However the federal police have no way of dealing with drone issues. They do not have access to drones, fighter jets, or surface to air missiles so the issue still persists.

Recently, in February of 2026, Germany's Parliament, specifically the Bundestag approved a new amendment which expanded the Air defense law and military power allowing for the Bundeswehr to respond directly to drone issues. This comes after there has been a recent increase in drone sightings since the Ukraine conflict began.

In addition to allowing the Bundeswehr to respond directly, the amendment now criminalizes intentionally gaining unauthorized access to airports if it compromises civil air security. It will also allow State police forces to ask the military for assistance in dealing with drone issues.

==== Open Category ====
By far, most people fly drones in the open category, for which there are three flight categories A1, A2 and A3. Drones can be used privately and commercially. In any case, the drone must be controlled using a visual line of sight between the pilot and their vehicle.

Flight Categories

A1/A3: Required for drones of 250 grams (8.8 oz) or more, a free online exam with 40 multiple-choice questions after registration, and confirming the pilot's identity. After passing the exam, the pilot receives the licenses for both A1 and A3.

A2: Requires the A3 license. Written on-site exam with 30 multiple-choice questions. Mandatory online training. The pilot has to practice with a drone under A3 rules. The pilot must be able to deal with various scenarios, e.g. people entering the flight area, manual take-offs and landings, estimating altitudes and distances using external reference values, and returning the drone to the starting point under difficult situations.

European Remote Pilot Licenses
Category	Maximum weight	Flights over non-involved individuals	Requirements, restrictions and duties
A1, < 250 grams	250 grams (8.8 oz)	allowed, but should be avoided	Operator of the drone must be registered if the vehicle has an onboard camera or a sensor that collects person-related data; otherwise, there is no need for a license.
A1, < 900 grams	900 grams (32 oz)	must be avoided	Flight area must be assessed in order to make flights over non-involved persons unlikely.
A2	4 kilograms (8.8 lb)	prohibited	Horizontal minimum distances to non-involved persons: In low-speed mode (< 3 m/s (9.8 ft/s)) 5 meters, otherwise 30 meters. Additionally, there is the 1:1 rule: If the horizontal distance to the next non-involved person is x meters, the maximum allowed flight altitude is x meters.
A3	25 kilograms (55 lb)	prohibited	At least 150 meters of distance to commercial, residential or public buildings and recreational areas, and at least 30 meters from non-involved persons. Additionally, the 1:1 rule (from category A2) must be followed. In any case, the minimum horizontal distance to non-involved persons is the distance that the vehicle travels within 2 seconds when flying at maximum speed.

In the open category, no drone can be flown higher than 120 metres (390 ft) above ground, and flights over gatherings of people are forbidden. Some weight-specific rules apply if the drone is heavier than 250 grams:

- the operator of the vehicle must carry a third party liability insurance
- the vehicle must be marked with the operator's personal registration code
- flights are forbidden within 5 kilometers of airports and airfields.

A pilot can choose to operate the drone in a higher category. For example, a person can gain experience with a 3 kilograms drone without an A2 license if the requirements of category A3 are met.

In order to allow A3 flights near buildings and recreational areas, e.g. for roof inspections, the Swiss Federal Office of Civil Aviation has outlined a (national) rule that can be followed alternatively: Whenever there are more than 10 persons in circle with a radius of 100 meters, the drone can be flown with a minimum horizontal distance of 150 meters to the center of the circle. This essentially creates a flight area (where no non-involved persons are allowed to stay), and a 50 meters wide belt around the flight area that must be continuously watched for non-involved persons. Applying this rule requires a proper inspection of the area, and flight planning (e.g. a flight must take place in the early morning before visitors arrive at a public park).

==== Special Category ====
The special category applies to drones and flights that overstep the limitations of A1/A2/A3. Examples: Flights above 120 meters AGL, no line of sight (drone is controlled through a live video feed), or the vehicle is heavier than 25 kilograms. In order to fly in the Special Category, the national aviation authority needs to issue a permit.

In a written manual, the drone operator must systematically review the operational risks, and how they are dealt with. Also, the operator must describe how he intends to co-operate with other authorities (e.g. Air Traffic Control).

==== Certified Category ====
The risks involved in operating drones are exceptionally high. Possible (future) cases involve transporting freight or passengers. The pilot must possess a pilot's license, the vehicle must have a type certificate, and the company operating the vehicle must be issued an air operator's certificate.

=== Hong Kong ===
While no-fly zones have been declared in Victoria Harbour, the airport, military sites, prisons and in government-run leisure facilities, it was reported that rules were rarely enforced or observed. The Hong Kong government proposed to introduce regulations that will broadly follow American standards, which might require all drones above a certain weight to be registered. Information would then made available to law enforcement authorities, and failure to register and tag a drone could be punishable by a US$250,000 (HK$1.95 million) fine or up to three years in jail. A short public consultation on the matter is set to be conducted by the first quarter of 2018, and to finish by mid-2018. SUA weighing over 250g (except SUA of which flight is wholly within an enclosed area of domestic premises) must be registered with Civil Aviation Department (CAD) before operation, SUA registration may be submitted by a natural person of at least 18 years of age.

Category of Operation	Standard Category A1 Operation	Standard Category A2 Operation	Advanced Operation
Criteria	Category A1 SUA (weight ≤ 250 g) (Within Category A1 operating requirements, see Q6)	Category A2 SUA (250 g < weight ≤ 7 kg) and Category A1 SUA under exemption (Within Category A2 operating requirements, see Q6)	(i) SUA weight ≤ 7 kg but exceeding the respective Standard Cat A1/A2 operating requirements; (ii) SUA weight > 7 kg and ≤ 25 kg; (iii) operations involving carriage of dangerous goods; or (iv) operations in restricted flying zone (except wholly within enclosed area)
Registration and labelling of SUA	✖	✔	✔
Registration of remote pilots	✖	✔	✔
Training and assessment of remote pilots	✖	✖	✔
Basic equipment (flight log and geo-awareness)	✖	✔	✔
Permission from CAD prior to operations required	✖	✖	✔
SUA insurance for third-party liability (bodily injury and/or death)	✖	(Will commence on a later date to be specified)	✔ (Minimum coverage: HKD $10 million)
Time of operations	Daylight only		-
Maintain full-time visual line of sight	✔		-
Maximum flying altitude [Above Ground Level (AGL)]	100 ft	300 ft	-
Minimum lateral separation from uninvolved people / structures / vehicles / vessels	10 m	10 m / 30 m	-
Maximum speed	20 km/h	20 km/h / 50 km/h	-
Maximum number of SUA to be operated by a remote pilot at the same time	1		-
Maximum dimensions of SUA	1 m, except that the longest distance between any two rotor blade tips can be up to 1.2 m		-
Carriage of person or animal	Unless with permission		-
Nothing to be dropped from SUA	Unless with permission		-

=== India ===
Permission from WPC is required for importing any radio controlled equipments in India, including drones/UAV. Drones imported into India, without prior permission from WPC and DGCA, will be confiscated by Customs at point of entry. Drones above 2 kg (4.4 lb) also requires Air Defense clearance(Flight permit) and drone pilots who are at least 18 years old, and has completed the 'drone pilot training'.

DGCA had issued finalized drone guidelines on August 27, 2018. The regulations came into force from December 1, 2018. Under the regulations, drones are restricted items and cannot be carried in hand baggage. All drone operations are restricted to daylight and within visual line of sight. Shooting in well-lit enclosed premises using micro drones up to 200 ft (61 m) is permitted even after sunset.

=== Indonesia ===
In 2015, the Indonesian Ministry of Transportation's Directorate General of Civil Aviation published a rule that regulates the usage of Unmanned Aerial Vehicles in the Indonesian Airspace. The rule states that "UAVs should not fly above the altitude of 120m and should not fly inside restricted or prohibited area, and areas around airports." UAVs that require altitudes higher than 120m would require a written authorization from the Directorate General of Civil Aviation. UAVs equipped with imaging equipment should not fly within 500m from the border of restricted or prohibited area, and if the UAV is involved in imaging activities, the operator should have written permission from the local government. Special UAVs equipped with farming equipment such as seed spreader or insecticide spray should only operate in farmland, and should not operate within 500m of housing area.

Instead of NFZ (No-fly zone) and No-Drone Zone (Airspace around airport at radius of 5 miles), there is a local regulation called KKOP (Kawasan Keselamatan Operasi Penerbangan). Indonesian Remote Pilot Certified and Drone Expert, Arya Dega, the KKOP is a UAV-restricted area that not included in NDZ or NFZ. I.e.: Presidencial Palace, Government Building, some of Hospital, and Military Facility.

=== Iran ===
Since May 2023, imported drones are illegal. Flying drones are banned in Mazandaran province. Tehran city permits are done by IRGC base. All drones are registered for air defense. Kish island had a test UAV post delivery. There are 18,000 drones.

Post-war in June 2025 Iranian regime globally fully banned any and all drones unless entirely permissioned to fly via IRIB Islamic Republic Broadcasting.

=== Japan ===
On 11 September 2015, an amendment to the Aeronautical Act was issued to introduce safety rules on unmanned aircraft (UA)/drones. The new regulations came into effect on 10 December 2015. According to the Civil Aviation Bureau in Japan, the term “UA/drone”s refers to any airplane, rotorcraft, glider, or airship which cannot accommodate any person on board and can be remotely or automatically piloted (excluding those lighter than 200 grams, inclusive of the battery weight.)

Any person who intends to operate a UA/drones in the following airspace is required to obtain special permission from the Minister of Land, Infrastructure, Transport, and Tourism.

- (A) All airspace above or around airports, heliports and aerodromes. (airspace above the OLS, obstacle limitation surfaces.)
- (B) All airspace 150 meters above ground/water surface.
- (C) All airspace above Densely Inhabited Districts (DID), which are defined and published by the Ministry of Internal Affairs and Communications. (i.e. urban area and suburb, so only rural area is allowed)

When no permission is required from the minister, or obtained permission by extremely troublesome procedures, anyone should operate UA/drones in the daytime and within Visual Line of Sight (VLOS). A 30-meter operating distance has to be maintained between the UA/drones and persons or properties on the ground/water surface. UA/drones should not be operated over event sites where many people gather. UA/drones should not carry hazardous materials such as combustible or explosives (except one for power source). Objects should not be dropped off from UA/drones other than touching down the ground. The restrictions can be granted by special permission from the minister.

Furthermore, for security reasons, anyone cannot levitate any flying object including UA/drones, aeroballoons, gliders, flyboards, and jet packs within about 300 meters from the National Diet Building, the official residents of speakers of the House of Representatives and the House of Councillors, the Prime Minister's Official Residence, the Kasumigasekis, the Supreme court, Tokyo Imperial Palace (including Akasaka Imperial Residences), the main offices of political parties, the diplomatic mission offices, nuclear power plants, and other nuclear facilities, as well as buildings used for inter-governmental political forum such as Group of Seven temporarily.

Flying UA/drones above some parks, coasts, and ports including Tottori Sand Dunes is restricted by the by-laws in some prefectures of Japan. Like many other countries, it is a kind of trespass to fly UA/drones indoors, near above the dwellings, or near above its surrounding soil without the permission of a person with legitimate rights.

=== Malaysia ===
Any person in charge of a small unmanned aircraft with a mass of 20 kilograms or less may fly the aircraft without approval from the Department of Civil Aviation Malaysia as long as “he is satisfied that the flight can safely be made”.

=== Myanmar ===
In November 2017, Myanmar sentenced three journalists and their driver to two months’ imprisonment for operating a drone near parliament while shooting a documentary. While Myanmar has no specific law on drones, individual authorities have tried to restrict the use of such equipment over their premises.

=== The Philippines ===
In 2015, the Civil Aviation Authority of the Philippines (CAAP) announced that owners or operators of unmanned aircraft vehicles (UAVs) who will operate the drones for commercial purposes must register with the CAAP, and secure a certification. Commercial uses include filming, aerial mapping, surveying, and other revenue purposes.

For operations specifically for model, sports, hobby, and recreational activities, authorisation from the CAAP is not required. All operations of UAVs in Philippine airspace have to comply with the general guidelines stated in Philippine Civil Aviation Regulations Part 11.11.1.2 (General UAV Operations).

The UAV must be flown:

- 30 meters beyond a person who is not directly associated with the operation of the UAV;
- An altitude not exceeding 400 feet Above Ground Level (AGL);
- Outside 10 km radius from the Aerodrome Reference Point (ARP); and
- The UAV shall stay clear of populated area unless an approval from the CAAP has been granted.

=== Republic of Ireland ===
In 2012, the Irish Aviation Authority published a document setting out safety requirements for any unmanned aerial system. The IAA policy is that unmanned aerial systems may not be flown without the operator receiving a specific permission from the IAA. New regulations, including a registry of UAVs over 1 kg were introduced in December 2015.

=== Singapore ===
In Singapore, laws were passed in Parliament in May 2015 to allay concerns over safety, security and privacy surrounding unmanned aerial vehicles (UAVs). The Unmanned Aircraft (Public Safety and Security) Bill outlines regulations for the safe flying of drones and enforcement action against errant users. For instance, permits are required to fly drones above 7 kg, or within a 5 km (3.1 mi) radius of an aerodrome.

Before conducting any outdoor activities, operators should ensure that the UA is flown within the permitted areas. The Civil Aviation Authority of Singapore (CAAS) website provides a map delineating prohibited areas, danger and restricted areas, areas within 5 km of an airport, or an airbase and protected areas.

In general, permits are not required for recreational or research uses of UA in Singapore, as long as the operation of the UA is in line with CAAS’ operating conditions.

Situations where recreational or research uses of UA require a permit are when:

- The total mass of UA including payload exceeds 7 kg (Operator permit and Class 1 Activity Permit required)
- UA is flown higher than 200 feet above mean sea level (Class 2 Activity Permit required)
- Within restricted, danger, protected, prohibited areas and within 5 km of an aerodrome / airbase (Class 2 Activity Permit required)

Regardless of UA weight or location of UA operations, an operator permit and a Class 1 Activity Permit is required for operations that are non-recreational or non-research in nature. The permit application form can be found on the CAAS website.

Depending on the nature of the flight or UA used, other possible permits that may be required from other agencies include:

- Singapore Police Force (SPF) for aerial photography and/or overflight of security-sensitive locations
- Info-communications Media Development Authority (IMDA) of Singapore for use of radio frequencies and power limits other than in IMDA's guidelines for short range devices.

From February 1, 2021, anyone using a UAV needs to obtain an unmanned aircraft basic training certificate (UABTC) or unmanned aircraft pilot licence (UAPL). Without a UABTC, UAPL, activity/operator permit during checks by Civil Aviation Authority of Singapore enforcement officers, he or she can face S$20,000 for their first offence. Repeat offenders face a fine of up to S$40,000 and/or up to 15 months’ jail.

=== South Africa ===
In April 2014, the South African Civil Aviation Authority announced that it would clamp down on the illegal flying of UAVs in South African airspace. They also stated that as they had not authorised any such flights, existing ones were being done illegally. A growth in the use of UAVs had prompted the SACAA to integrate them into South African airspace, but until regulations were in place, people operating them could be fined up to R50,000 and face up to 10 years prison.

Following discussions between the South African Civil Aviation Authority and key role players such as operators, manufacturers, and other airspace users, a set of draft regulations were submitted to the Minister of Transport for review and approval. The regulations were accepted by Dipuo Peters, the South African transport minister, and put into effect 1 July 2015. The regulations are called the Eighth Amendment of the South African Civil Aviation Regulations, 2015

The new regulations focus strongly on safety aspects with UAVs not being allowed to fly higher than 120m or closer than 50 meters to a person or group of people without prior approval from the SACAA.

Airspace restrictions also apply above and adjacent to:

- Nuclear plants
- Prisons
- Police stations
- Crime scenes
- Court of law
- National key points

Manned aircraft always have the right of way and the passing of UAVs close to such aircraft are strictly prohibited. Pilots are required to tune into the air traffic services in which they are flying and all flight activity are required to be recorded in a logbook. Public roads may not be used for take-off and landing.

Another safety aspect prohibits UAVs to be used in adverse weather conditions where visibility will be impaired. Separate approval is required where line of sight is unmanageable or for night flying.

Current regulations do not allow UAVs to be used for deliveries or for the transportation of goods. UAVs cannot tow other aircraft, perform aerobatic and aerial displays, or be flown in a formation.

UAV pilots are required to have a CAA approved and valid pilot license and a letter of approval which is valid for 12 months. Any incidents should be reported to the relevant authorities, especially if serious damage or injury was caused.

=== South Korea ===
Under the local law as of 2016, drones are banned from many places in the country, especially from the northern parts of Seoul, where key government offices are clustered. Areas around military installations and nuclear power plants are also no-fly zones.

=== Thailand ===
All type of drones, except toy drones without a camera, have to be registered with the Civil Aviation Authority. The regulations cover nearly all forms of drone use from commercial and recreational to scientific. Drone users who failed to register their drones by 9 January 2018 could face up to five years in jail or a 100,000 baht (US$3100) fine.

=== United Kingdom ===
In August 2012, The U.K.'s Civil Aviation Authority (CAA) stated that it will require non-military drones larger than 20 kg to be able to automatically sense other aircraft and steer to avoid them.

As of 2013, the CAA rules are that UAV aircraft less than 20 kilograms in weight must be in direct visual contact with the pilot, cannot fly within 150 meters of a congested area or within 50 meters of a person or vehicle, and cannot be used for commercial activity.

In July 2018, the CAA rules were updated to make it against the law to fly above 400 feet (120 m) and to make it against the law to fly your drone within 1 kilometre (0.62 mi) of an airport or airfield boundary.

On February 20, 2019, The Department for Transport announced a new legislation to extend the ‘no-fly’ zone around airports, banning drones from flying within 5 kilometres (3.1 mi) of runways.

Owners of drones and model aircraft are required to register their drone and obtain an 'Operator ID' and, if their drones are 250 g or more, a 'Flyer ID', all of which can be obtained by taking and passing an online theory test provided by the CAA. Children and teenagers under the age of 18 are not authorised to register a UAV, nor hold an Operator ID, but can receive a Flyer ID for a UAV owned by their parents or legal guardian by passing the same theory test. Operator IDs must be renewed each year, while Flyer IDs last for three years. Once a drone or model aircraft is registered and its operator passes the theory test, the owner's Operator ID must be displayed when in operation.

=== United States ===
The US Federal Aviation Administration has adopted the name small unmanned aircraft system (sUAS) to describe aircraft systems under 55 pounds without a flight crew on board. The unmanned aircraft flown in the USA's National Airspace System must operate under the rules of a Community Based Organization for recreational purposes or 14 CFR Part 107 for commercial operations.

Within the United States, the Congress passed a bill in 2012 that mandated the FAA to create a plan for allowing UAS into commercial airspace. Subsequently, the FAA issued “the Integration of Civil Unmanned Aircraft Systems (UAS) in the National Airspace System (NAS) Roadmap”.

As of 2014, obtaining an experimental airworthiness certificate for a particular UAS is the way civil operators of unmanned aircraft are accessing the National Airspace System of the United States. FAA Order 8130.34, Airworthiness Certification of Unmanned Aircraft Systems, establishes procedures for issuing the certification, and as such establishes guidance standards for certification aspects of development and operation, which may be addressed by adoption of such standards as ARP4754A, and DO-178C.

The FAA roadmap is, in essence, maturation of the acceptance of UAVs from the “experimental” aircraft certification to requiring the same standard airworthiness type certification of manufacturing design as is now required of conventional manned aircraft.

In December 2015 the FAA announced that all UAVs weighing more than 250 grams flown for any purpose must be registered with the FAA.

A FAA rule states that "a single registration applies to as many UAVs as an owner/operator owns or operates. Failure to register can result in civil penalties of up to $27,500, and criminal penalties which could include fines up to $250,000 and/or imprisonment for up to three years."

To show problems with the FAA process in August 2015, an attorney was able to get FAA approval for a commercial drone that was actually a battery powered paper airplane toy. The Toy's controllable range is 120 feet (37 meters) and maximum flight time is 10 minutes. It is too underpowered to carry a camera. The December 2015 registration specifically excludes paper airplanes, Frisbees, and other flying objects that are not true UAVs.

In addition to FAA certification, the regulation of usage of UA systems by government authorities in the United States for law enforcement purposes is determined at a state level.

In 2021, the FAA published and put into effect Remote ID regulations, officially requiring all drones above 250g in mass and all drones flown for commercial purposes to have a digital license plate which, in real time, publicly transmits the location of both the drone and the operator (in most cases). Within the first half of 2021, RaceDayQuads v. FAA was filed, challenging the law in US Federal Court, with RaceDayQuads founder primarily claiming the law allows for the invasion of privacy to drone operators, opens them up to the profiting of their activity by security companies, and would increase harassment of UAV operators.

=== Uruguay ===
In 2014, the Uruguay government regulated UAVs. Machines under 25 kg do not require any operating license, and have a maximum flight altitude of 120 meters within visual line of sight. Machines up to 260 kg (570 lb) must be registered, require an operator permit, and may have above 120 meters with permission from air traffic control. Machines above 260 kg are classified as aircraft, and require a full pilot licence.

== See also ==
- Aerial photography § Regulations
- First-person view (radio control) § Regulations and safety
