= White Fox (disambiguation) =

White Fox is a Japanese animation studio with several projects having closely related comics/manga.

White Fox may also refer to:

== Animals ==
- White fox or Arctic fox, an animal native to Arctic regions (see Arctic fox fur)
- A white-furred red fox

== Literature ==
- White Fox, a. k. a. The White Fox Chronicles, a 2000 novel by Gary Paulsen
- White Fox, a 2023 novel by Owen Matthews, the third installment in the Black Sun trilogy

== Music ==
- White Fox (album), a 2010 album by Ham Sandwich
- "White Foxes", a 2012 song by Susanne Sundfør

== Places ==
- White Fox, Saskatchewan
- White–Fox House Archeological Site, a historic site in New Smyrna Beach, Florida

== Other uses ==
- White Fox (character), a Marvel Comics character
- The Fox Lover, a. k. a. Bai Hu (White Fox), a 2013 Chinese film
- John Hargrave or White Fox, British youth leader and politician
- WhiteFox Defense, an America-based drone airspace security company
- White Fox (fashion brand), an Australian fast-fashion brand
