= Antigravity A1 =

Chinese 360-degree camera drone

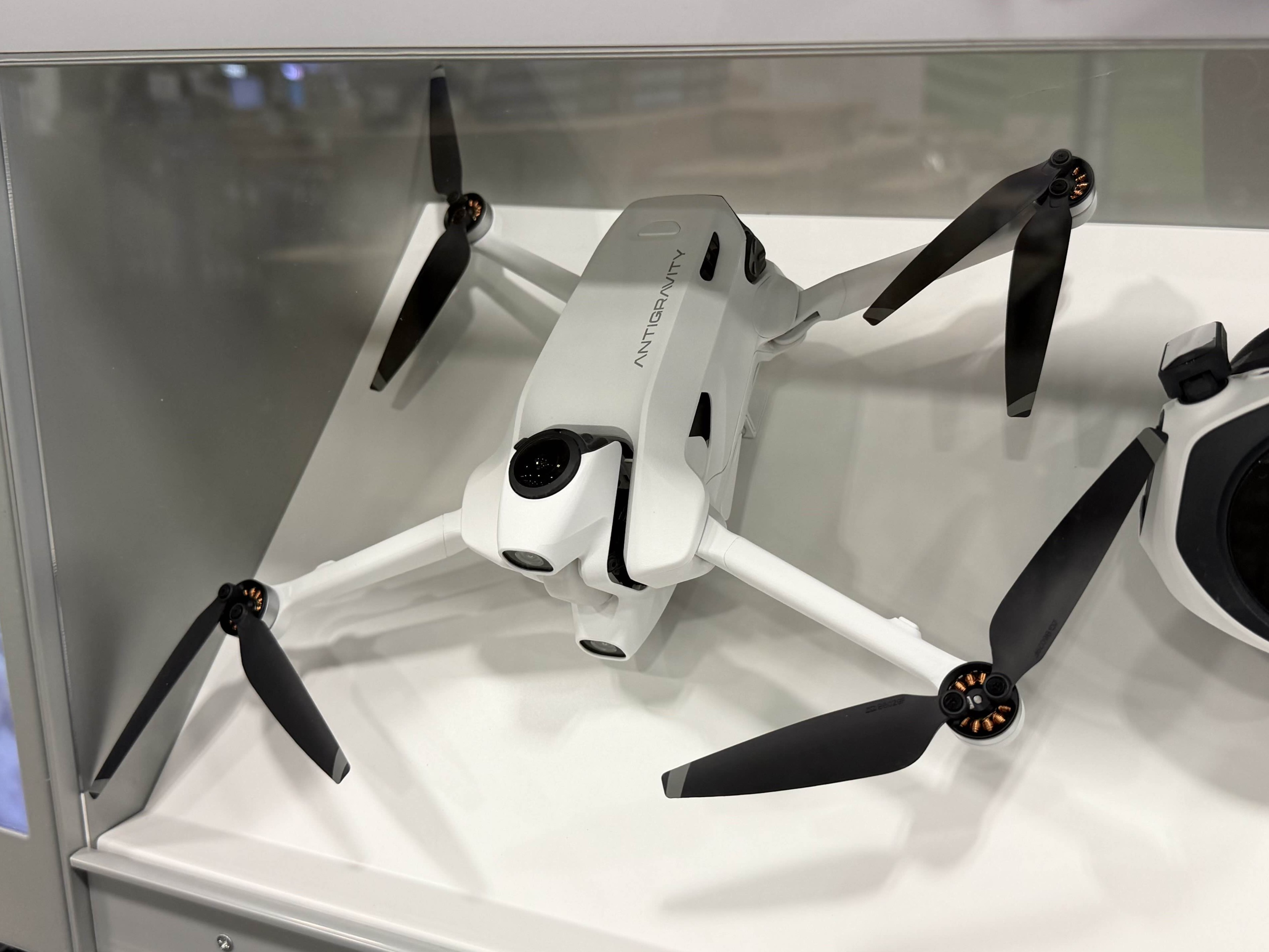
- A1 display model

General information
- Type: Camera drone
- Manufacturer: Antigravity

History
- Manufactured: 2025-present
- Introduction date: August 2025

The Antigravity A1 is the world's first 360 drone produced by Antigravity, a new drone brand incubated by Insta360 in collaboration with third-party partners.

== Design and development ==
The Antigravity A1 was announced in August 2025 as the first drone to have a built-in 8K 360-degree camera system. The camera system, which is based on the Insta360 X Series, uses one upward and one downward-facing lens to stitch together an omnidirectional view without obstruction from any part of the drone. Like the competing DJI Mini, the A1 is a quadcopter with folding arms and weighs 249 grams (0.549 lb), exempting it from drone registration requirements in most regions, though it is capable of transmitting a Remote ID signal if necessary. The drone has retractable landing gear, ensuring an unobstructed view while in-flight. The controller, which has been compared to that of the DJI FPV and Avata, uses hand movements rather than the more conventional dual-stick configuration. The remote pilot wears head-tracking OLED goggles for a first-person view from the camera system. Though the goggles give the pilot a view in only one direction at a time, the A1 records full 360-degree video which can viewed from any angle when played back. The A1 has a maximum flight time of 24 minutes with a standard 2360 mAh battery. This can be increased to 39 minutes with a 4345 mAh high-capacity battery, though doing so increases its weight to 291 grams (0.642 lb). The A1 has a payload detection feature that automatically lands the drone if it detects an excessive weight attached to it. A spokesperson for Antigravity claimed that this was to prevent the A1 from being weaponized.

The A1 was praised for its ability to capture 360-degree video and its ease of use, though its high price drew some criticism. As the pilot is required to wear FPV goggles and is unable to see the drone during flight, the Federal Aviation Administration requires A1 flights to have a visual observer.

== Specifications (Antigravity A1, standard battery) ==
Data from Antigravity

General characteristics

- Length: 1 ft 0.15 in (0.3086 m) (0.1413 m (5.56 in) folded)
- Width: 1 ft 3.05 in (0.3823 m) (0.0962 m (3.79 in) folded)
- Height: 3.51 in (0.0892 m) (0.0814 m (3.20 in) folded)
- Max takeoff weight: 1 lb (0.249 kg)
- Battery: 7.16V 2360 mAh (16.9 Wh) lithium-ion battery

Performance

- Maximum speed: 35.8 mph (57.6 km/h, 31.1 kn)
- Range: 8.0 mi (13 km, 7.0 nmi)
- Endurance: 24 minutes
- Service ceiling: 13,123 ft (4,000 m) max takeoff altitude
- Rate of climb: 1,575.2 ft/min (8.0 m/s)
- Maximum wind resistance: 38.52 km/h (24 mph)
- Operating temperature: -10°C (-14°F) to 40°C (104°F)

Avionics

- Camera: 55MP 1/1.28" CMOS camera
- GNSS compatibility: GPS, Galileo, and BeiDou
- Transmission system: OmniLink 360

== See also ==
- History of unmanned aerial vehicles

Aircraft of comparable role, configuration, and era

- DJI Avata
- DJI Lito
- DJI Mini

Related lists

- List of unmanned aerial vehicles
