= DJI Neo =

Chinese camera drone

Neo
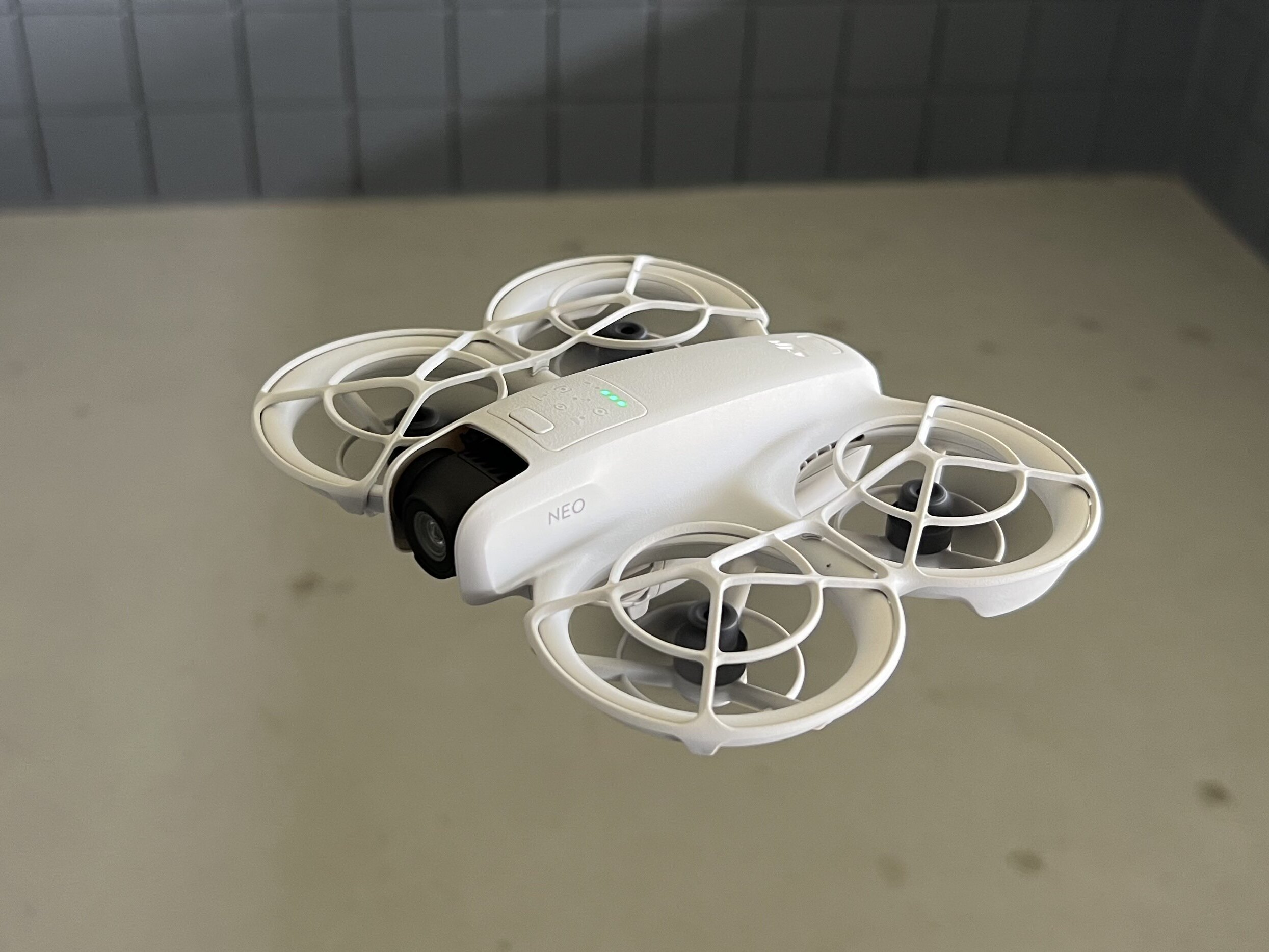
- DJI Neo with upper propeller guards attached

General information
- Type: Unmanned aerial vehicle
- National origin: China
- Manufacturer: DJI
- Status: In production

History
- Manufactured: 2024–present
- Introduction date: September 2024

The DJI Neo is a teleoperated compact quadcopter drone for vlogging, released by the Chinese technology company DJI.

== Design and development ==
The Neo was introduced in September 2024, being the lightest and most compact drone released by DJI at the time and intended for vloggers. The drone is a quadcopter powered by four brushless DC electric motors driving three-bladed propellers, and has a weight of only 135 g (4.8 oz), exempting it from drone registration regulations in the United States. The Neo, which is considered the successor to the DJI Spark and a competitor to the HoverAir X1, is capable of launching and landing from a hand and is designed to be flown without a remote using a smartphone, voice controls, and AI subject tracking, though an optional remote can be used if desired. The drone has a single-axis gimbal-mounted 12-megapixel camera capable of shooting 4K video at 30 frames per second (FPS), and is capable of transmitting live video via Wi-Fi (when using a smartphone) or an O4 transmission system (when using a controller or FPV goggles). The Neo lacks obstacle avoidance and a MicroSD card slot, though it does have 22GB of internal memory. Avionics include integrated electronic speed controllers and a "tiny" inertial measurement unit. The drone has six LED lights to indicate its flight mode. The Neo lacks Remote ID capabilities, making it unsuitable for professional operators. Power is provided by a 1435 mAh battery, giving the drone a maximum flight time of 18 minutes.

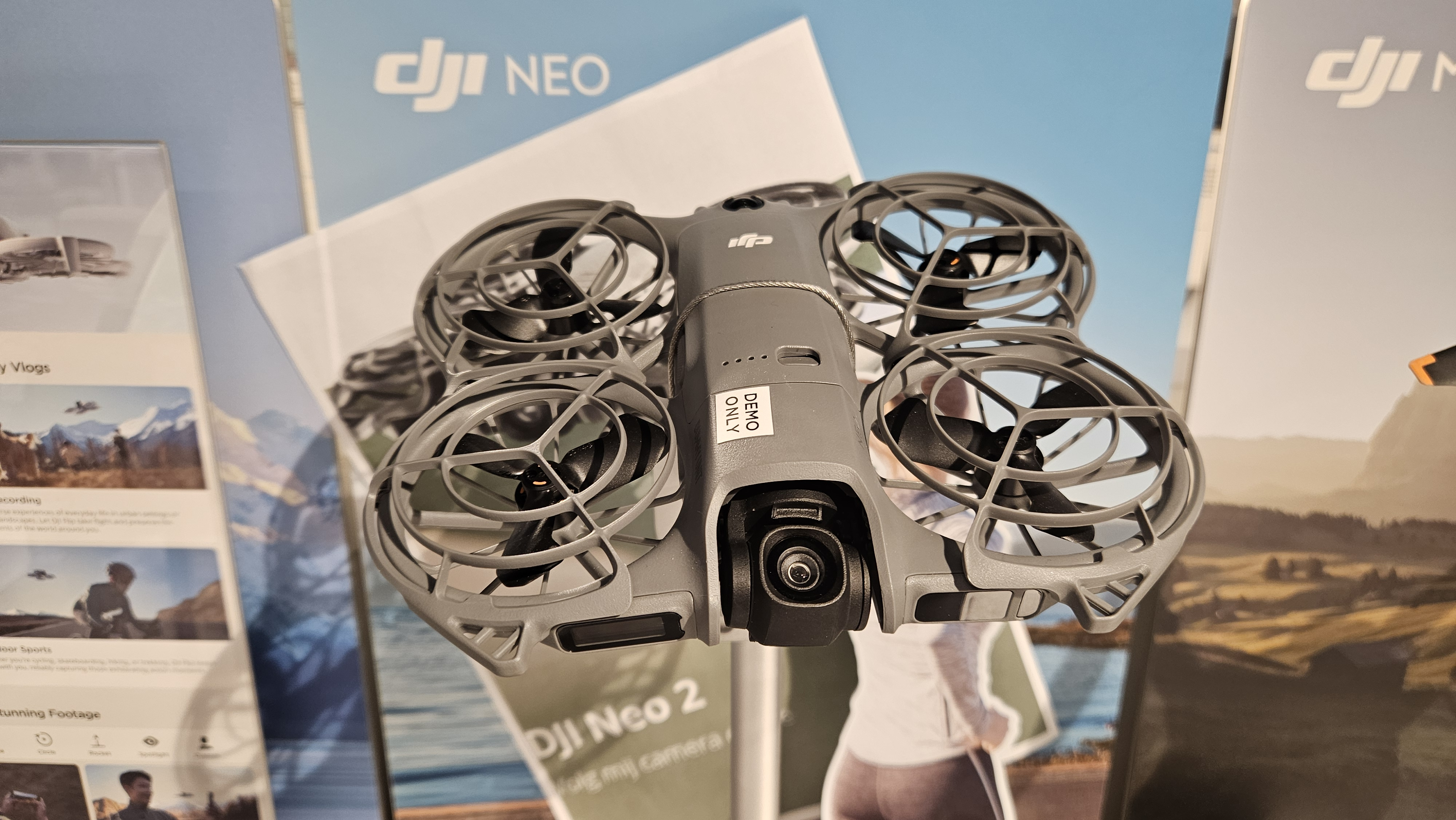
Neo 2 display model

An improved model, the Neo 2, was released in Asia in October 2025, followed by a global release (except in the United States) the following month. The Neo 2's camera has improved image processing and a wider field of view while using the same sensor size as its predecessor, allowing for 4K video at 60 FPS or 4K slow motion video at 100 FPS. The gimbal was also upgraded to a two-axis unit, allowing the drone to capture stable footage in windy conditions or during intense maneuvers. The Neo 2 also features a forward-looking lidar-based obstacle system, gesture control, and improved following speed. The drone is slightly larger than its predecessor, and weight was increased to 151 g (5.3 oz). The Neo 2 has a small screen to indicate its flight mode, replacing the LED lights, and has 49GB of internal storage. The onboard O4 transmission system was removed on the Neo 2, though an external O4 transponder can be attached for flights with a remote controller. Power is provided by a 1606 mAh battery, giving the drone a maximum flight time of 19 minutes.

== Variants ==
Neo 2 with the optional O4 transponder module installed

Neo
Company designation Model DN1A0626. Original model with a weight of 135 g (4.8 oz), an onboard O4 video transmission system, a 12MP camera, 22GB of internal storage, and powered by a 1435 mAh battery giving it a flight time of 18 minutes. Introduced in September 2024.
Neo 2
Company designation Model DEN225. Improved model with a weight of 151 g (5.3 oz), an improved 12MP camera, an obstacle avoidance system, gesture control, provisions for an external O4 transponder module, 49GB of internal storage, and powered by a 1606 mAh battery giving it a flight time of 19 minutes. Introduced in October 2025.

== Specifications (Neo) ==
Data from

General characteristics

- Length: 0.130 m (5 in)
- Width: 0.157 m (6 in)
- Height: 0.0485 m (2 in)
- Empty weight: 0.135 kg (0.29 lb)
- Battery: 7.3V 1435 mAh (10.5 Wh) lithium-ion Intelligent Flight Battery
- Powerplant: 4 × Brushless DC electric motor
- Propellers: 3-bladed propellers, 0.051 m (0 ft 2 in) diameter

Performance

- Maximum speed: 57.6 km/h (35.8 mph, 31.1 kn)
- Range: 7.0 km (4.3 mi, 3.8 nmi)
- Endurance: 18 minutes (17 minutes with propeller guards)
- Service ceiling: 120 m (390 ft)
- Rate of climb: 3 m/s (590 ft/min)

Avionics

- Camera: 12MP 1/2" CMOS camera
- Transmission system: Wi-Fi or O4

== See also ==
Aircraft of comparable role, configuration, and era

- DJI Flip
- DJI Lito
- DJI Mini
- Ryze Tello
