= DJI Flip =

Chinese camera drone

Flip
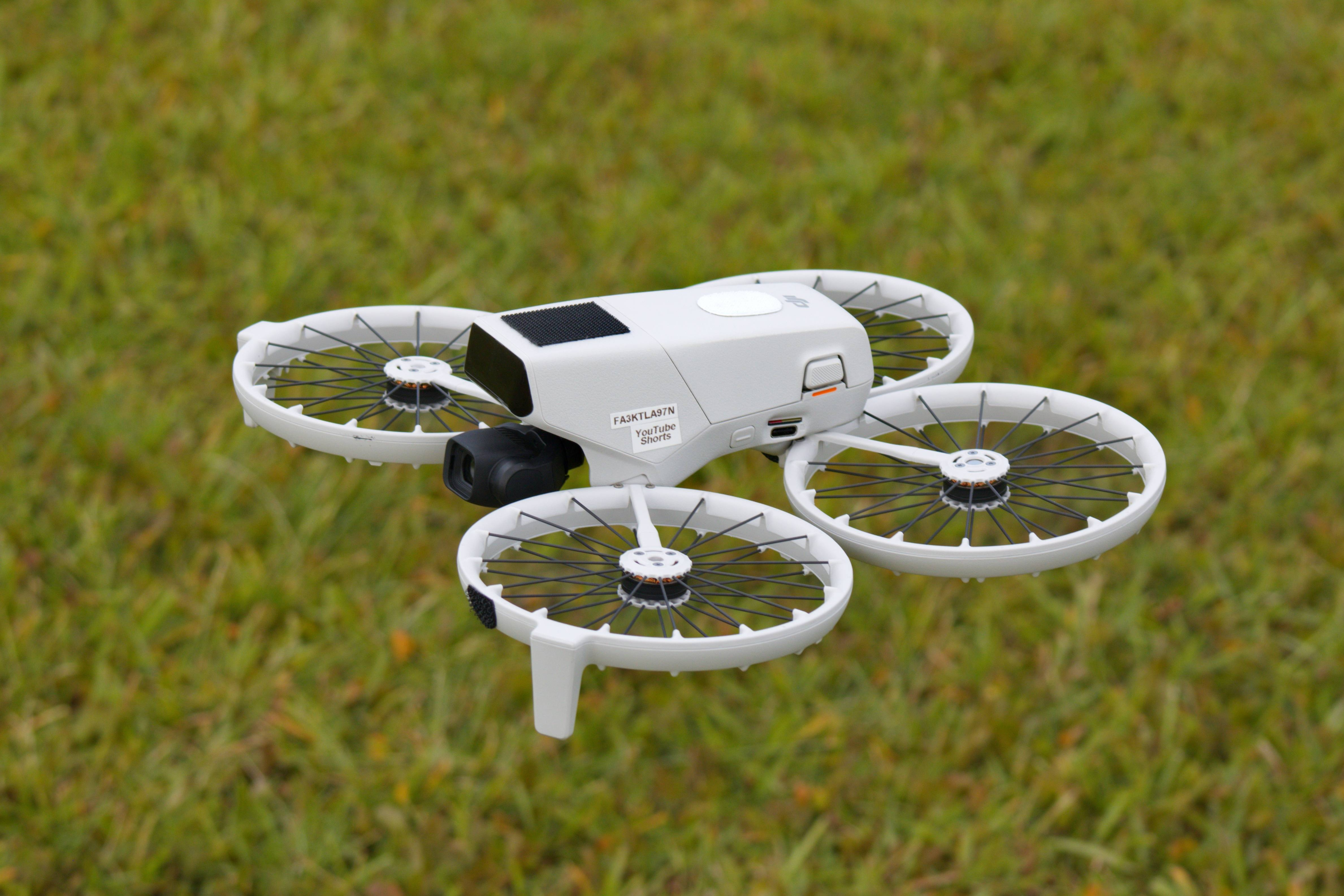
- DJI Flip

General information
- Type: Unmanned aerial vehicle
- National origin: China
- Manufacturer: DJI
- Status: In production

History
- Manufactured: 2025–present
- Introduction date: January 2025

The DJI Flip (company designation DF1A0424) is a teleoperated compact quadcopter drone for personal and commercial aerial photography and videography use, released by the Chinese technology company DJI.

== Design and development ==
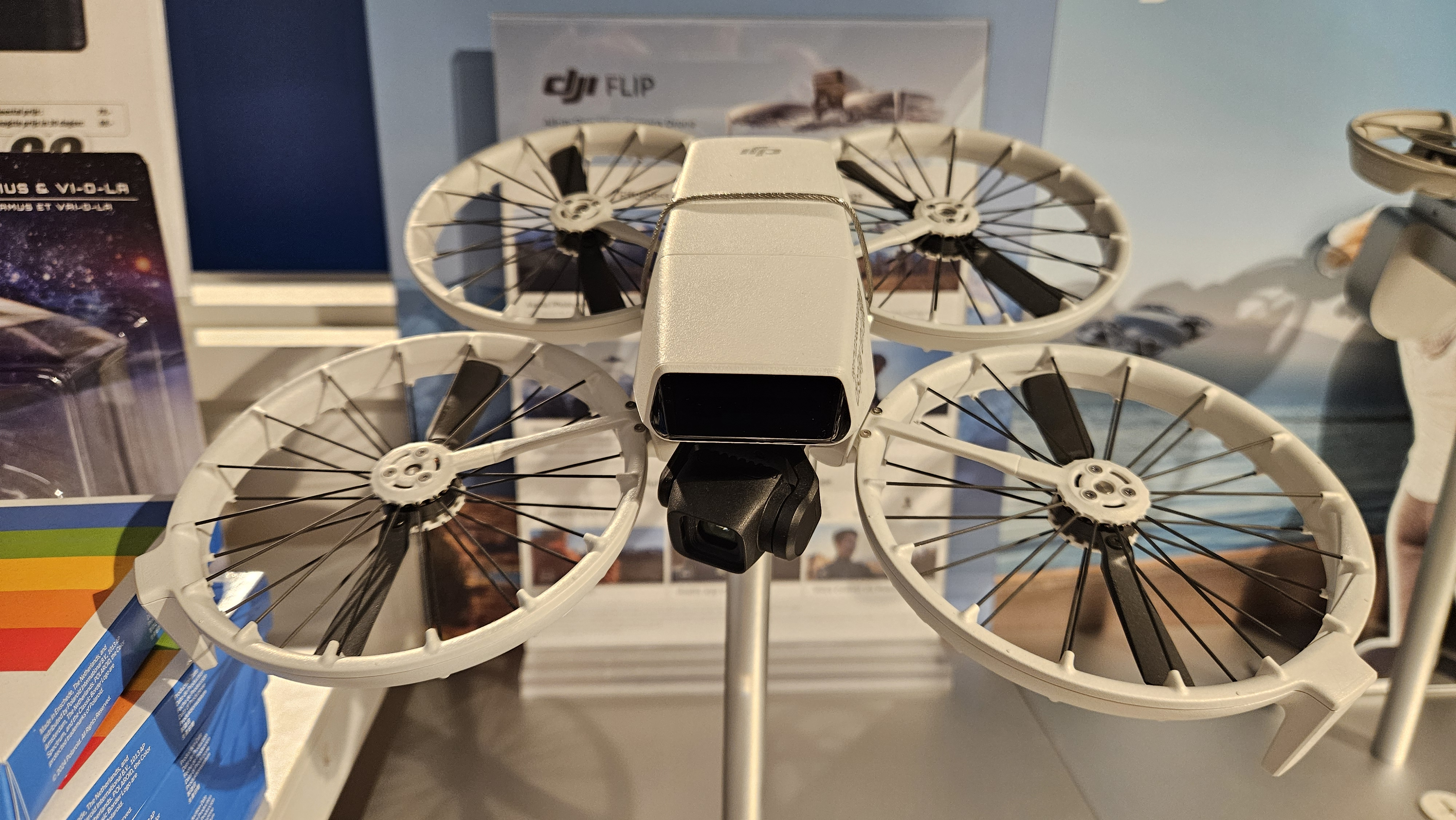
DJI Flip in a store display

Released in January 2025, the Flip is a compact quadcopter marketed for beginners. According to DJI, the Flip was designed to "combine the simplicity of the DJI Neo with the stunning photo capabilities of the DJI Mini", though there were no plans to replace either series with the Flip. The Flip is larger and heavier than the Neo, weighing just under 249 g (8.8 oz) compared to the latter's 135 g (4.8 oz). The drone has four foldable arms for ease of transport, similar to the DJI Mini, but with built-in propeller guards with carbon fiber spokes; a first for folding DJI drones. The Flip features a 48-megapixel camera with a 1/1.3-inch CMOS sensor, capable of shooting 4K high-dynamic-range (HDR) video at 60 frames per second, mounted on a three-axis gimbal. The drone also has a forward and downward-facing lidar obstacle avoidance system. Power is provided by a 3110 mAh battery, giving the Flip a maximum flight time of 31 minutes.

The Flip was praised for its camera, which was compared to that of the contemporary Mini 4 Pro. However, the drone was criticized for its large size when folded compared to the Mini, and was noted to be louder than the Mini 4 Pro despite its ducted propellers. While the built-in propeller guards allow for safe hand launches and landings, flight testing revealed that they "act like sails" and reduce efficiency when flying against the wind. Due to its weight, the Flip is not required to be registered in the United States and several other countries, though the lack of Remote ID prevents it from being used professionally.

== Specifications (Flip) ==
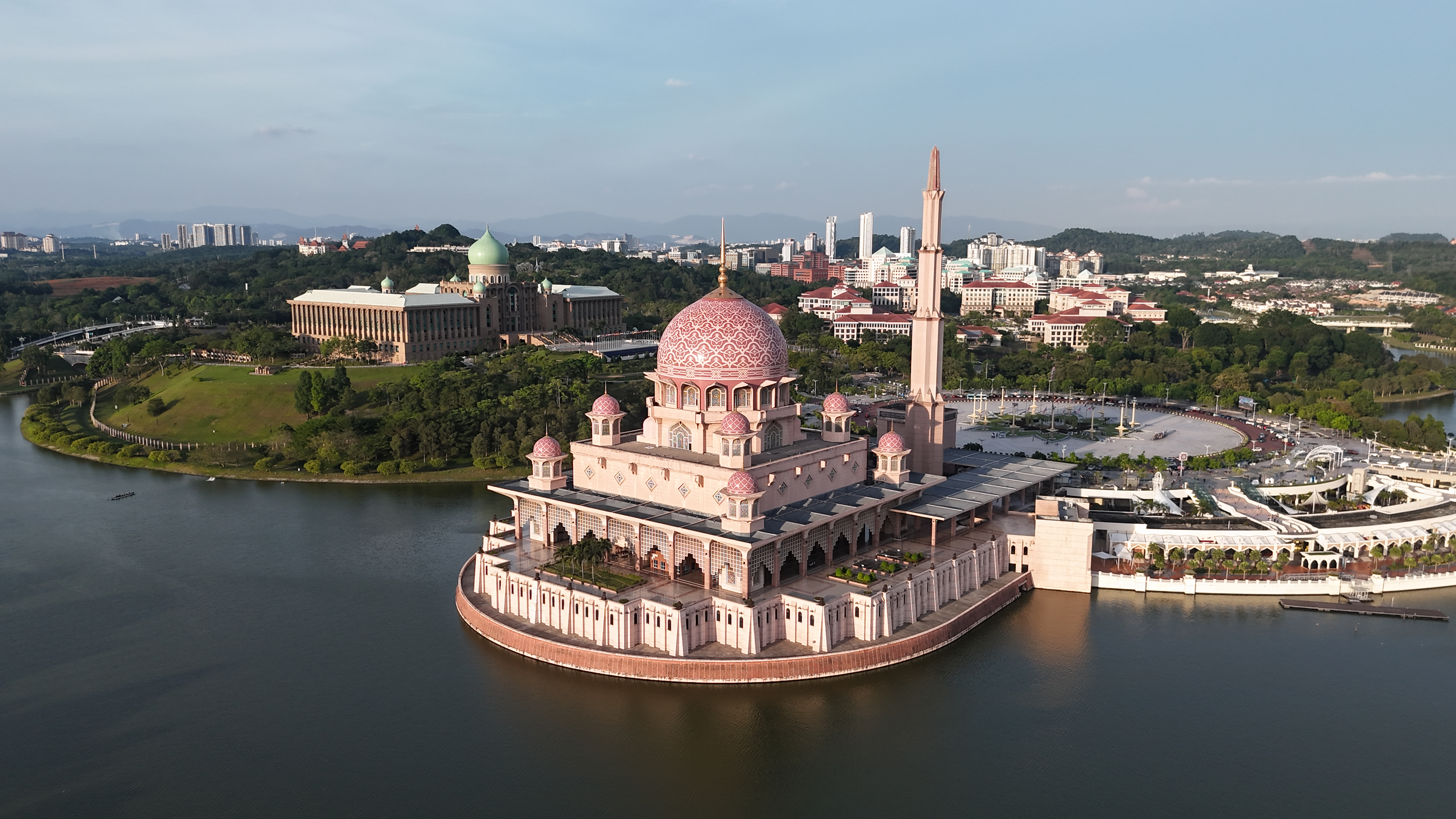
Image of the Putra Mosque taken with a DJI Flip

Data from

General characteristics

- Length: 0.233 m (9 in) (0.136 m (5.4 in) folded)
- Width: 0.280 m (11 in) (0.062 m (2.4 in) folded)
- Height: 79 m (259 ft 2 in) (0.165 m (6.5 in) folded)
- Empty weight: 0.249 kg (1 lb)
- Battery: 3110 mAh 7.16 V (22.3 Wh) LiNiMnCoO2 battery
- Powerplant: 4 × brushless DC electric motor

Performance

- Maximum speed: 57.6 km/h (35.8 mph, 31.1 kn)
- Range: 14 km (8.7 mi, 7.6 nmi)
- Endurance: 31 minutes
- Service ceiling: 3,500 m (11,500 ft)
- Rate of climb: 5 m/s (980 ft/min)

Avionics

- Camera: 48MP 1/1.3" CMOS
- GNSS compatibility: GPS, Galileo, BeiDou
- Transmission system: O4

== See also ==
Aircraft of comparable role, configuration, and era

- DJI Air
- DJI Lito
- DJI Mini
- DJI Neo
