= Regulation of UAVs in the United States =

The US Federal Aviation Administration (FAA) has adopted the name small unmanned aircraft system (sUAS) to describe aircraft systems without a flight crew on board weighing less than 55 pounds. More common names include UAV, drone, remotely piloted vehicle (RPV), remotely piloted aircraft (RPA), and remotely operated aircraft (ROA). These unmanned aircraft flown in the National Airspace System must operate under the rules of a community based organization for recreational purposes or 14 CFR Part 107 for commercial operations. All UAVs weighing more than 250 grams flown for any purpose must be registered with the FAA. Remote ID generally requires drones that are required to be registered to broadcast identification and location information during flight, except when operated in FAA-recognized identification areas (FRIAs) or under limited exemptions.

== Types of federal regulation ==
Multiple categories of rules have been proposed or enacted in the United States by the Federal Aviation Administration. The restrictions imposed on the operation of UAS differ for each category of rule.

=== Operator licensing ===
The FAA requires all commercial UAS operators to obtain a remote pilot license under Part 107 of the Federal Aviation Regulations. To qualify for a Part 107 UAS license, an applicant must be over 16 years of age, demonstrate proficiency in the English language, have the physical and mental capacity to operate a UAS safely, pass a written exam of aeronautical knowledge, and complete a Transportation Security Administration background security screening.

Recreational UAS operators are not required to obtain a Part 107 license. However, unlicensed recreational UAS operation is only lawfully permitted if the UAS is operated for purely non-commercial purposes, and if the operator complies with restrictions on recreational UAS operation, including prohibitions on operating their UAS beyond the operator's visual line of sight. As of April 21, 2021, the FAA amended 14 CFR Part 107 to permit certain small unmanned aircraft operations over human beings without requiring an individual waiver under § 107.200, provided the aircraft qualifies for Category 1, 2, 3, or 4 as defined in §§ 107.110–107.115, and the operation complies with the limitations in § 107.39 and applicable Remote Identification requirements under 14 CFR Part 89.

The same amendments also authorize night operations without a waiver, provided the remote pilot has completed the required knowledge testing or recurrent training addressing night operations, and the aircraft is equipped with anti-collision lighting visible for at least three statute miles, as required under § 107.29.

=== UAS registration ===
Commercial (Part 107) operators are required to register their UAS with the FAA, regardless of its weight. In addition, recreational operators are also required to register their UAS if its total weight (including any payload) meets or exceeds 0.55 pounds. UAS registration costs $5. Recreational UAS operators may obtain a single user registration number and register multiple UAS for a single $5 fee, while commercial operators must individually register and pay a $5 registration fee per each UAS. Recreational UAS weighing less than 0.55 pounds do not need to be registered.

UAS operators must clearly mark their registration number on the outside of their UAS in an easily readable manner. This requirement enables authorities to trace and locate the operator of a recovered UAS, if the UAS was involved in an accident or unlawful activity.

=== Remote identification ===
The Remote ID rule requires UAS to broadcast information in real-time about operation of the UAS, including the location of the UAS and its control station, and a unique identification number that officials may be able to cross-reference to identify the UAS operator. For those UAS which lack the ability to broadcast Remote ID information, the rule requires operators to retrofit the UAS with a broadcast module capable of broadcasting identifying information.

Exceptions to the Remote ID requirement include UAS weighing under 0.55 pounds, and UAS being operated within specially designated flying zones or "FAA-Recognized Identification Areas" where Remote ID will not be required.

== Regulation history ==
=== 2012 and Prior ===
Well before any FAA concerns ever existed for UAS aircraft, at the very start of the 21st century the Federal Communications Commission had already started "registration" of many of its radio services' licensees in the United States, by assigning each licensee a unique ten-digit numerical "FRN" (FCC Registration Number) registration code as shown on their paper licenses, as part of the then-new "CORES" (COmmission REgistration System) organization system for FCC licensee records - this was also done for all United States-licensed amateur radio operators, who have regulation 97.215 in the FCC Part 97 Amateur Radio Service rules that allows use of any Ham-legal frequency solely for recreational operation of model aircraft and surface models, with up to one watt of RF output. No requirement of any sort has yet been issued by the FCC for the "FRN" number's display on Ham-licensed, amateur radio frequency-operated radio control model aircraft, nor on any other variety of remotely-guided model craft operated on Ham bands, such as surface-operated models of any sort; with the FCC reserving any use or display of such "FRN" numbers for future needs, beyond their existing assignment to radio service licensees and display on their licenses.

On September 16, 2005, the FAA released memorandum AFS-400 UAS Policy 05-01 as a guideline to the usage of UAS in the U.S. National Airspace System (NAS). On February 6, 2007, the FAA released a policy document indicating that UAVs are recognized by the definition of aircraft. Soon after on February 13, a Policy Statement concerning the operation of drones was issued and clarified the distinction between a UAV and a model aircraft.

The FAA Modernization and Reform Act of 2012 set a deadline of September 30, 2015, for the agency to establish regulations to allow the use of commercial drones. While such regulations were pending, the agency claimed it was illegal to operate commercial unmanned aerial vehicles, but approved non-commercial flights under 400 feet if they followed Advisory Circular 91-57, Model Aircraft Operating Standards, published in 1981. However, the FAA's attempt to fine a commercial drone operator for a 2011 flight were thrown out on March 6, 2014, by NTSB judge Patrick Geraghty, who found that the FAA had not followed the proper rulemaking procedures and therefore had no UAV regulations. The FAA appealed the judgment of the NTSB administrative law judge. Texas EquuSearch, which performed volunteer search and rescue operations, was also challenging FAA rules in 2014.

=== 2013 - 2015 ===
As of August 2013, commercial unmanned aerial system (UAS) licenses were granted on a case-by-case basis, subject to approval by the Federal Aviation Administration (FAA). Previously, COAs (certificate of authorization) required a public entity as a sponsor. For example, when BP needed to observe oil spills, they operated the Aeryon Scout UAVs under a COA granted to the University of Alaska Fairbanks. COAs have been granted for both land and shipborne operations. In 2014, the FAA approved at least ten applications from specific companies for commercial use of drones, including movie-makers and surveyors.

In December 2013, the FAA announced six operators it was authorizing to conduct research on drone technology, to inform its pending regulations and future developments. These were the University of Alaska (including locations in Hawaii and Oregon), the state of Nevada, Griffiss International Airport in New York State, the North Dakota Department of Commerce, Texas A&M University–Corpus Christi, and Virginia Tech.

In addition to FAA certification, the regulation of usage of UA systems by government authorities in the United States for law enforcement purposes is determined at a state level. As of September 2014, 20 U.S. states had enacted legislation addressing the use of UA systems and the handling of data collected by them. Nearly all enacted laws require a probable cause warrant to be issued before the use of a UA system for surveillance purposes is authorized.

In May 2014, a group of major news media companies filed an amicus brief in a case before the U.S.'s National Transportation Safety Board, asserting that the FAA's "overly broad" administrative limitations against private UAS operations cause an "impermissible chilling effect on the First Amendment newsgathering rights of journalists", the brief being filed three months before a scheduled rollout of FAA commercial operator regulations. On November 18, 2014, however, regarding the FAA v. Pirker case, the National Transportation Safety Board (NTSB) upheld FAA's authority over enforcement of the operation of UAS or model aircraft by affirming that since "unmanned aircraft systems (UAS) meet the legal definition of 'aircraft'," the operation of which are thus subject to civil penalties.

=== 2015 - Present ===
On January 12, 2015, CNN announced that their News Network has been cleared by the FAA, in the first program of its kind to test camera-equipped drones for news gathering and reporting purposes. CNN has partnered with the Georgia Tech Research Institute to collect data for the program. The FAA said it will analyze the information to develop rules about using drones for news gathering.

On February 15, 2015, the FAA announced that up to seven thousand businesses could get approval to fly drones two years from now under proposed rules by the FAA. On Sunday the White House also issued a presidential directive that mandates federal agencies for the first time to disclose publicly where they are flying drones and what they do with the data they acquire using aerial surveillance.

In December 2015 the FAA announced that all UAVs weighing more than 250 grams flown for any purpose must be registered with the FAA. The FAA's Interim Rule can be accessed here. This regulation went into effect on December 21, 2015, and requires that hobby type UAV's weighing 0.25–25 kg (0.55–55.12 lb) needed to be registered no later than February 19, 2016. The FAA's registration portal for drones can be accessed here.

Notable requirements of the FAA UAV registration process include:

- Effective December 21, 2015, if the UAV has never been operated in U.S. airspace (i.e. its first flight outside), eligible owners must register their UAV's prior to flight. If the UAV previously operated in U.S. airspace, it must be registered.
- In order to use the registration portal, you must be 13 years of age or older. If the owner is less than 13 years old, then a parent or other responsible person must do the FAA registration.
- Each registrant will receive a certificate of aircraft registration and a registration number and all UAV's must be marked with the assigned FAA issued registration code (a ten-character alphanumeric ID code) for the registrant.
- The FAA registration requires a $5 fee and is valid for 3 years, but can be renewed for an additional 3 years at the $5 rate.

The new FAA rule provides that a single registration applies to as many UAVs as an owner/operator owns or operates. Failure to register can result in civil penalties of up to $27,500 and criminal penalties which could include fines up to $250,000 and/or imprisonment for up to three years.

To show problems with the FAA process, in August, 2015 an attorney was able to get FAA approval for a commercial drone that was actually a battery powered paper airplane toy. Its controllable range is 120 feet (37 meters) and maximum flight time is 10 minutes. It is too underpowered to carry a camera.

In February 2016, the FAA established a committee to develop guidelines for regulating safe UAV flight over populated areas, to the end of allowing commercial drone operation, in response to requests from companies involved in commercial drone development such as Amazon and Google. In addition, during the summer of the same year, the Federal Aviation Administration (FAA) and Office of the Secretary of Transportation (OST), Department of Transportation (DOT) released Rule Part 107, finalizing the regulation regarding the use of commercial UAS.

On May 19, 2017, the United States Court of Appeals for the District of Columbia Circuit, in ruling on Taylor v. Huerta reversed the Dec. 2015 UAV registration rule, commenting that "the FAA may not promulgate any rule or regulation regarding a model aircraft." Specifically, the FAA's Registration Rule for model aircraft (a/k/a drones) violates Section 336 of the FAA Modernization and Reform Act, and the FAA's Registration Rule to the extent it applied to model aircraft was vacated. The FAA began the process of refunding the registration fees.

On December 12, 2017, President Donald Trump signed into law the immediately-effective National Defense Authorization Act for Fiscal Year 2018, reinstating the FAA's drone registration requirement.

On May 9, 2018, the U.S. Transportation Secretary Elaine L. Chao announced the selection of local governments from 10 states to participate in the UAS Integration Pilot Program. The City of San Diego is one of the participant selected from California with a primary project goal focusing on commercial delivery and border protection.

On September 20, 2018, State Farm Insurance, in partnership with the Virginia Tech Mid-Atlantic Aviation Partnership and FAA Integration Pilot Program, became the first in the United States to fly a UAV 'Beyond-Visual-Line-Of-Sight' (BVLOS) and over people under an FAA Part 107 Waiver. The flight was made at the Virginia Tech's Kentland Farms outside the Blacksburg VA campus with a SenseFly eBee vehicle, Pilot-In-Command was Christian Kang, a State Farm Weather Catastrophe Claims Services employee (Part 107 & 61 pilot).

On May 31, 2019, the FAA updated AC 91-57 to Revision B, now entitled Exception for Limited Recreational Operations of Unmanned Aircraft.

By November 27, 2019, the United States' organization for homebuilt full-scale aircraft, the Experimental Aircraft Association, having reached a "memorandum of understanding" nine years earlier with the US' national aeromodeling organization, the Academy of Model Aeronautics, expressed concern over the unprecedented degree of FAA regulation of recreational model aircraft, stating that ""We see model aviation as an important pathway to manned flight," adding that "Our goal in this risk assessment process is to represent the safety concerns of our members while allowing the highest degree of freedom for legacy model aircraft, which have flown alongside us in the airspace for decades."

On December 28, 2020, the FAA announced the system, Remote Identification or Remote ID, would be effective 60 days from the expected publication date in the Federal Register in January 2021. Operators of UAS have thirty months to comply with the regulation and manufacturers have 18 months after the publication date to comply. An unsuccessful lawsuit against the remote ID rule was filed by RaceDayQuads.com, a website whose business consists of the retail of goods related to drone racing. The suit, known as RaceDayQuads v. FAA, was stated to be filed on March 17, 2021, and is claimed to be primarily crowdfunded via GoFundMe.

== State-level and municipal regulation ==
Under 49 U.S. Code § 40103, "The United States Government has exclusive sovereignty of airspace of the United States" and U.S. citizens have "a public right of transit through the navigable airspace." The FAA is invested with the authority to control traffic in navigable airspace and create operational and safety regulations on aircraft in navigable airspace. According to the FAA, "[a] navigable airspace free from inconsistent state and local restrictions is essential to the maintenance of a safe and sound air transportation system." With respect to navigable airspace and the aircraft operating in that airspace, federal regulations have preempted the field and the ability of state and local laws to regulate use of UAVs is limited.

Examples of state and local laws that, according to the FAA, conflict with the FAA's federal legal authority and require consultation with the FAA before being enacted:

- Operational UAS restrictions on flight altitude, flight paths; operational bans; any regulation of the navigable airspace. For example–a city ordinance banning anyone from operating UAS within the city limits, within the air space of the city, or within certain distances of landmarks.
- Mandating equipment or training for UAS related to aviation safety such as geo-fencing would likely be preempted. Courts have found that state regulation pertaining to mandatory training and equipment requirements related to aviation safety is not consistent with the federal regulatory framework. Med-Trans Corp. v. Benton, 581 F. Supp. 2d 721, 740 (E.D.N.C. 2008); Air Evac EMS, Inc. v. Robinson, 486 F. Supp. 2d 713, 722 (M.D. Tenn. 2007).

Examples of state and local laws that, according to the FAA, are generally permissible under the state's police powers:

- Requirement for police to obtain a warrant prior to using a UAS for surveillance.
- Specifying that UAS may not be used for voyeurism.
- Prohibitions on using UAS for hunting or fishing, or to interfere with or harass an individual who is hunting or fishing.
- Prohibitions on attaching firearms or similar weapons to UAS.

In 2013, a UAV flying over Manhattan collided with several buildings and crashed onto the pavement. It was reported that a man had been arrested days after the incident and that he had been charged with reckless endangerment. He was identified because he was seen in the video recorded by the drone. The Federal Aviation Administration fined the man $2,200. The FAA said that his operation of the UAV was "flying in restricted airspace without getting permission from controllers and flying in a "careless or reckless manner" and "endangered the safety of the national airspace system". This was the first FAA attempt to penalise a non-commercial flight.

In 2014, the California State Senate passed rules imposing strict regulations on how law enforcement and other government agencies can use drones. The legislation would require law enforcement agencies to obtain a warrant before using an unmanned aircraft, or drone, except in emergencies. In 2015, Virginia passed legislation that a drone may only be used in law enforcement if a warrant has been issued; excluding emergencies. New Jersey's drone legislation passed in 2015 states that not only are you required to provide a warrant for drone use in law enforcement, but the information collected must be disposed within two weeks. Other states that have drone regulation are Florida, Idaho, Illinois, Indiana, Iowa, Montana, Oregon, Tennessee, Texas, and Wisconsin.

The first landmark court case on state and municipal drone regulation was Singer v. City of Newton, No. 17-10071-WGY (D. Mass. Sept. 21, 2017). Dr. Michael Singer, a physician, technology advocate, and FAA-certificated drone operator, sued the City of Newton, Massachusetts challenging four provisions in the city's recently enacted drone ordinance. These provisions required drone operators to register with the Newton city clerk; prohibited drone flights over the city without prior permission of all landowners below; and prohibited beyond-visual-line-of-sight (BVLOS) operations. Singer, who represented himself in court, argued that these provisions were preempted by the FAA Modernization and Reform Act of 2012 and the Federal Aviation Act of 1958 (as recodified). U.S. District Judge William G. Young agreed, striking down the challenged parts of the ordinance due to conflict preemption. The City of Newton appealed the decision to the United States Court of Appeals for the First Circuit, but later withdrew its appeal. Singer v. Newton is widely regarded as the first court case to examine the intersection of federal and state powers over drone operations.

== Anti-UAV legislation ==
Some locations, such as Charlottesville, Virginia, Iowa City, Iowa and St. Bonifacius, Minnesota have passed legislation that limits use of UAVs. In New York state, the city of Syracuse considered declaring the city a "Warrantless Surveillance Drone Free Zone" but put the legislation on hold after city counsellors became aware of a memorandum of understanding between the Justice Department and the Federal Aviation Administration.

In 2016, the Connecticut House of Representatives considered legislation to impose restrictions on drone weaponization. The legislation came after a man named Austin Haughwout, then an engineering student at Central Connecticut State University (CCSU), posted a video on YouTube showing a drone carrying a semi-automatic handgun, which he had assembled, and which was seen to fire the gun several times.

The City of New York has used its 1948 "Avigation law" to ban drones within its five boroughs, and the city encourages everyone who see a drone being flown in the city to call 911. However, New York's drone ban is considered by some to be unconstitutional, or pre-empted by the FAA's authority over federal airspace, and the media company Xizmo is currently litigating against the ban using these arguments.

== Prosecutions ==
In 2015, a drone operated by a civilian flew into the White House property. As a result, the drone manufacturer, DJI, issued a statement saying that they will now require that all of their drones would contain built-in geofencing limits.

== Lobbying ==
As of 2014, movie makers, real-estate agents, criminal-defense lawyers and farmers were among at least 68 groups with a political interest in drones. At least 28 universities and local government agencies as well as Amazon hope to use drones civilly someday. Limited commercial operations for drones weighing less than 55 pounds (25 kilograms) is a proposal due to be decided upon by the end of the year.

In June 2014, the Motion Picture Association of America stated its support of an FAA exemption for the use of small drones in limited low risk scenarios in film and television productions.
