= AC 91-57 =

American regulatory guidance

Exception for Limited Recreational Operations of Unmanned Aircraft
- FAA Publication
- Abbreviation: AC 91-57
- Year started: 1981
- Latest version: C 2022 October 20
- Organization: Federal Aviation Administration AFS-800
- Domain: Aviation safety, Regulation of UAVs in the United States

AC 91–57() is an FAA Advisory Circular (AC) (Subject: Exception for Limited Recreational Operations of Unmanned Aircraft ) that provides interim safety guidance to individuals operating unmanned aircraft, commonly known as drones, but inclusive of flying model aircraft, for recreational purposes in the National Airspace System of the United States.

== Summary ==
In 1981, in recognition of the safety issues raised by the recreational operation of RC model aircraft, the FAA published this brief AC, then entitled Model Aircraft Operating Standards, for the purpose of providing guidance to persons interested in flying drones and model aircraft as a hobby or for recreational use. This guidance conveys FAA expectation of good judgment on the part of unmanned aircraft operators so that persons on the ground or other aircraft in flight will not be endangered. The AC contains among other things, guidance for site selection. Users are advised to avoid noise sensitive areas such as parks, schools, hospitals, and churches. Hobbyists are advised not to fly in the vicinity of spectators until they are confident that the model aircraft has been flight tested and proven airworthy. Model aircraft should be flown below 400 feet above the surface to avoid other aircraft in flight. The FAA expects that hobbyists will operate these recreational model aircraft within visual line-of-sight.

== Non-applicability to commercial operations ==
Some commercial operators of unmanned aircraft systems have mistakenly used this AC as a basis for commercial flight operations. However, under FAA policy, AC 91–57 only applies to modelers, and thus specifically excludes its use by persons or companies for business purposes.
