= L.R. Fox =

American businessman

L.R.Fox
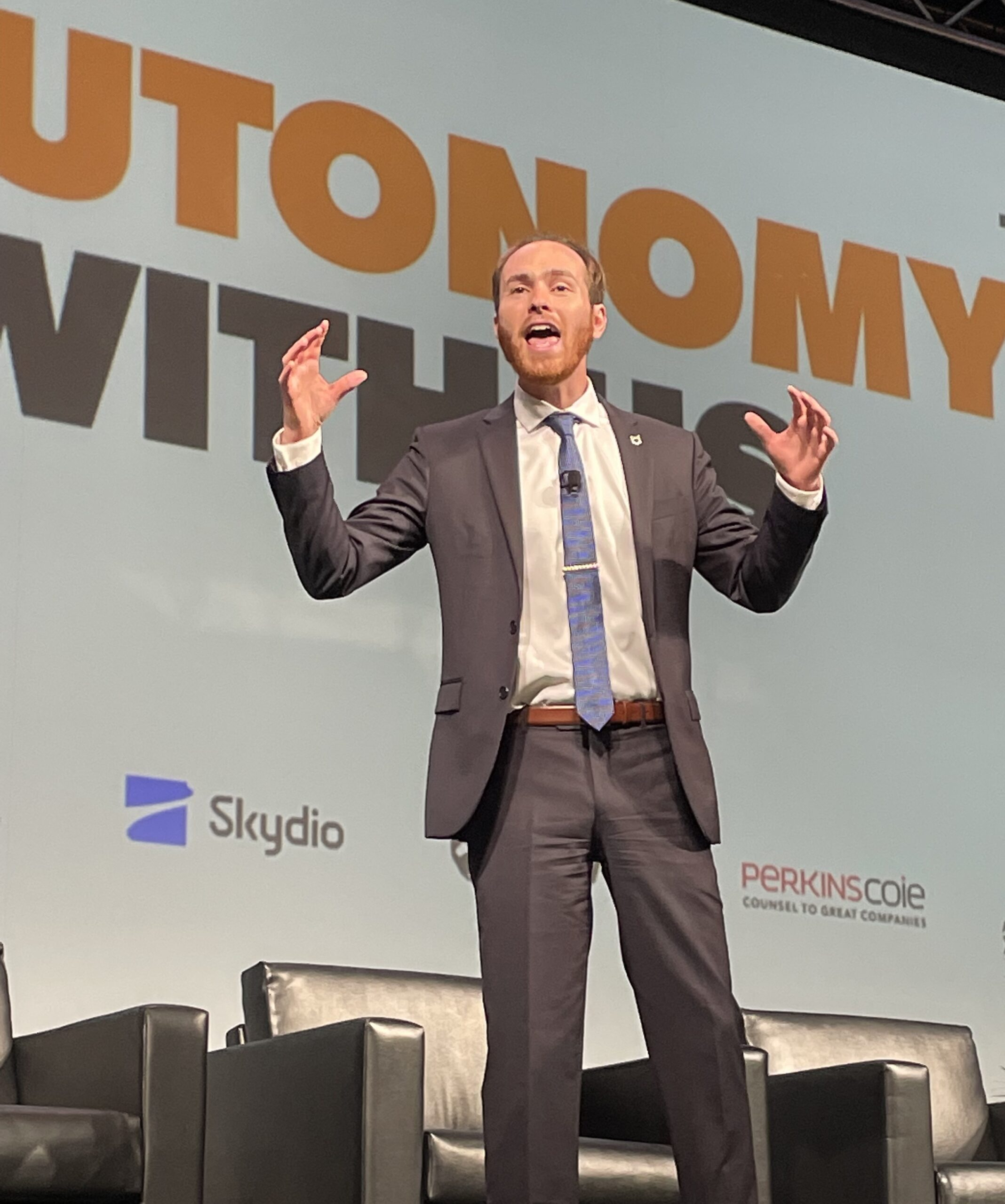
- Born: Luke Fox c. 1995 (age 30–31); California, United States
- Citizenship: American
- Occupation: Businessman
- Known for: Founder of WhiteFox Defense Technologies and NEXT Life Sciences

L.R. Fox is an American businessman known for founding companies in regulated industries like WhiteFox Defense Technologies, Inc, a US-based drone airspace security company based in California. He also founded the biotech company NEXT Life Sciences.

== Career ==
Fox founded WhiteFox Defense Technologies in 2012, he was 19 years old at the time. In 2019, Fox made the Forbes 30 Under 30 in manufacturing & industry.

In April 2021, WhiteFox and the U.S. Department of Homeland Security Science and Technology Directorate joined a cooperative research and development agreement.

Fox is also the Founder and Executive Chairman of NEXT Life Sciences. NEXT Life Sciences is a biotech company developing a product they call “Plan A”, a non-hormonal and reversible male contraceptive. In 2024, The Times reported that Fox and his team at NEXT Life Sciences are developing “Plan A” as a long-acting reversible contraceptive for men and a new male contraceptive option alongside the existing condom and vasectomy.

== Personal life ==
Fox grew up in California. He was raised in the foster care system.
