= Unmanned Aircraft Regulation =

2019/947
- Title: Commission Implementing Regulation (EU) 2019/947 of 24 May 2019 on the rules and procedures for the operation of unmanned aircraft

Commission Implementing Regulation (EU) 2019/947 of 24 May 2019 on the rules and procedures for the operation of unmanned aircraft is a regulation of the European Union regulating the flight of unmanned aircraft for civil usage, commonly known as drones.

== See also ==
- Regulation of unmanned aerial vehicles
