= DJI Lito =

Chinese camera drone

Lito
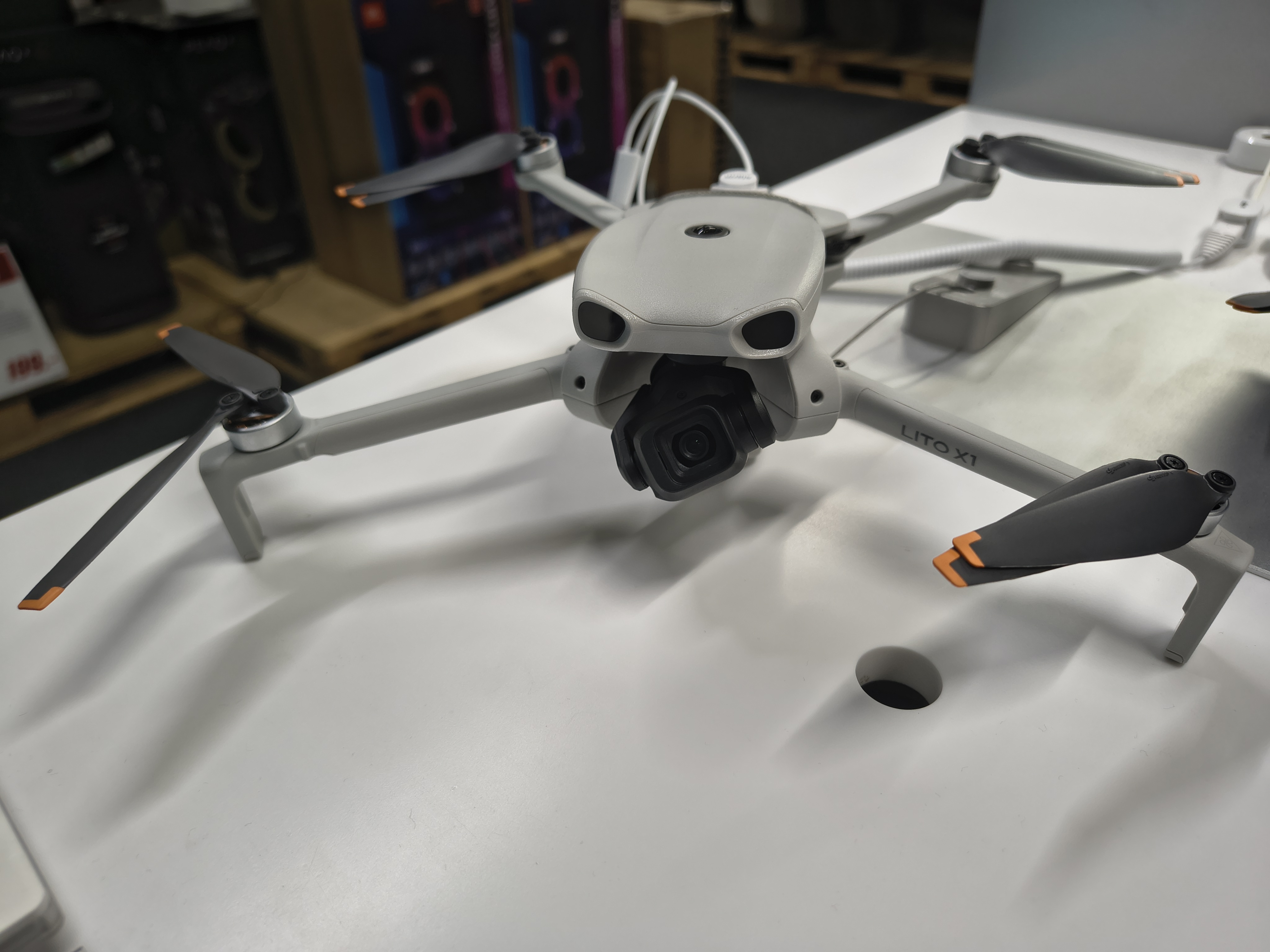
- Lito X1 display model

General information
- Type: Unmanned aerial vehicle
- National origin: China
- Manufacturer: DJI
- Status: In production

History
- Manufactured: 2026–present
- Introduction date: April 2026

The DJI Lito is a series of teleoperated compact quadcopter drones for personal and commercial aerial photography and videography use, released by the Chinese technology company DJI.

== Design and development ==
The Lito was announced by DJI on 23 April 2026 as an entry-level drone with two different variants; the Lito 1 and Lito X1. The Lito, which bears a resemblance to the DJI Mini, is a quadcopter with folding arms and a weight of 249 g (0.549 lb), which puts it below the mandatory registration thresholds in most many regions. Both Lito models feature an O4 video transmission system and an omnidirectional vision-based obstacle avoidance system. The Lito X1's obstacle avoidance system is complemented by a forward-facing lidar, allowing it to avoid obstacles in low-light conditions. The Lito 1 lacks the lidar of the X1 and has air vents in its place. Other differences between the two models include the camera and storage systems. The Lito 1 is equipped with a 48-megapixel 1/2" CMOS camera sensor and has no internal storage, instead relying on a microSD. The Lito X1 has a 48MP 1/1.3" CMOS sensor and 42GB of internal memory. Both models have a maximum flight time of 36 minutes with a standard battery, though DJI offers an "Intelligent Flight Battery Plus" that increases this to 52 minutes at the cost of pushing the drone's weight to above the registration thresholds of many regions.

== Reception ==
TechRadar praised the Lito X1 for its omnidirectional obstacle avoidance, noting that its predecessor, the Mini 4K, had only a downward-facing sensor. TechRadar also praised the drone for its video quality, which was noted to be above average for its price, though the default settings often led to overexposed images. Engadget compared the Lito's video quality to that of the DJI Neo 2 and the DJI Flip.

== Variants ==
Lito 1
Company designation Model DGN12C. Baseline model with 48MP 1/2" CMOS camera, an O4 transmission system, an omnidirectional vision-based obstacle avoidance system, and a flight time of 36 minutes. Released alongside the Lito X1 on 23 April 2026.
Lito X1
Company designation Model DGP14C. As Lito 1 but with a 48MP 1/1.3" CMOS camera, 42GB of internal storage, and a forward-facing lidar complementing the obstacle avoidance system. Released alongside the Lito 1 on 23 April 2026.

== Specifications (Lito X1) ==
Data from

General characteristics

- Length: 0.183 m (7 in) without propellers (0.144 m (5.7 in) folded)
- Width: 0.251 m (10 in) without propellers (0.094 m (3.7 in) folded)
- Height: 0.079 m (3 in) without propellers (0.062 m (2.4 in) folded)
- Empty weight: 0.249 kg (1 lb)
- Max takeoff weight: 0.340 kg (1 lb)
- Battery :
- Powerplant: 4 × brushless DC electric motor

Performance

- Maximum speed: 64.8 km/h (40.3 mph, 35.0 kn)
- Range: 21 km (13 mi, 11 nmi) (≈32 km (20 mi) with Intelligent Flight Battery Plus)
- Endurance: 36 minutes (52 minutes with Intelligent Flight Battery Plus)
- Service ceiling: 4,620 m (15,160 ft)
- Rate of climb: 7 m/s (1,400 ft/min)
- Maximum wind resistance: 38.52 km/h (23.94 mph)
- Operating temperature: -10°C (14°F) to 40°C (104°F)

Avionics

- Camera: 48MP 1/1.3" CMOS camera
- GNSS compatibility: GPS, Galileo, BeiDou
- Transmission system: O4

== See also ==
Aircraft of comparable role, configuration, and era

- Antigravity A1
- DJI Flip
- DJI Mini
- DJI Neo
