= DJI Avata =

Chinese FPV drone

Avata
- DJI Avata 2

General information
- Type: FPV drone
- National origin: China
- Manufacturer: DJI
- Status: In production
- Primary users: Israel Defense Forces People's Liberation Army

History
- Manufactured: 2022–present
- Introduction date: August 2022

The DJI Avata is a compact quadcopter FPV drone released by the Chinese technology company DJI.

== Design and development ==
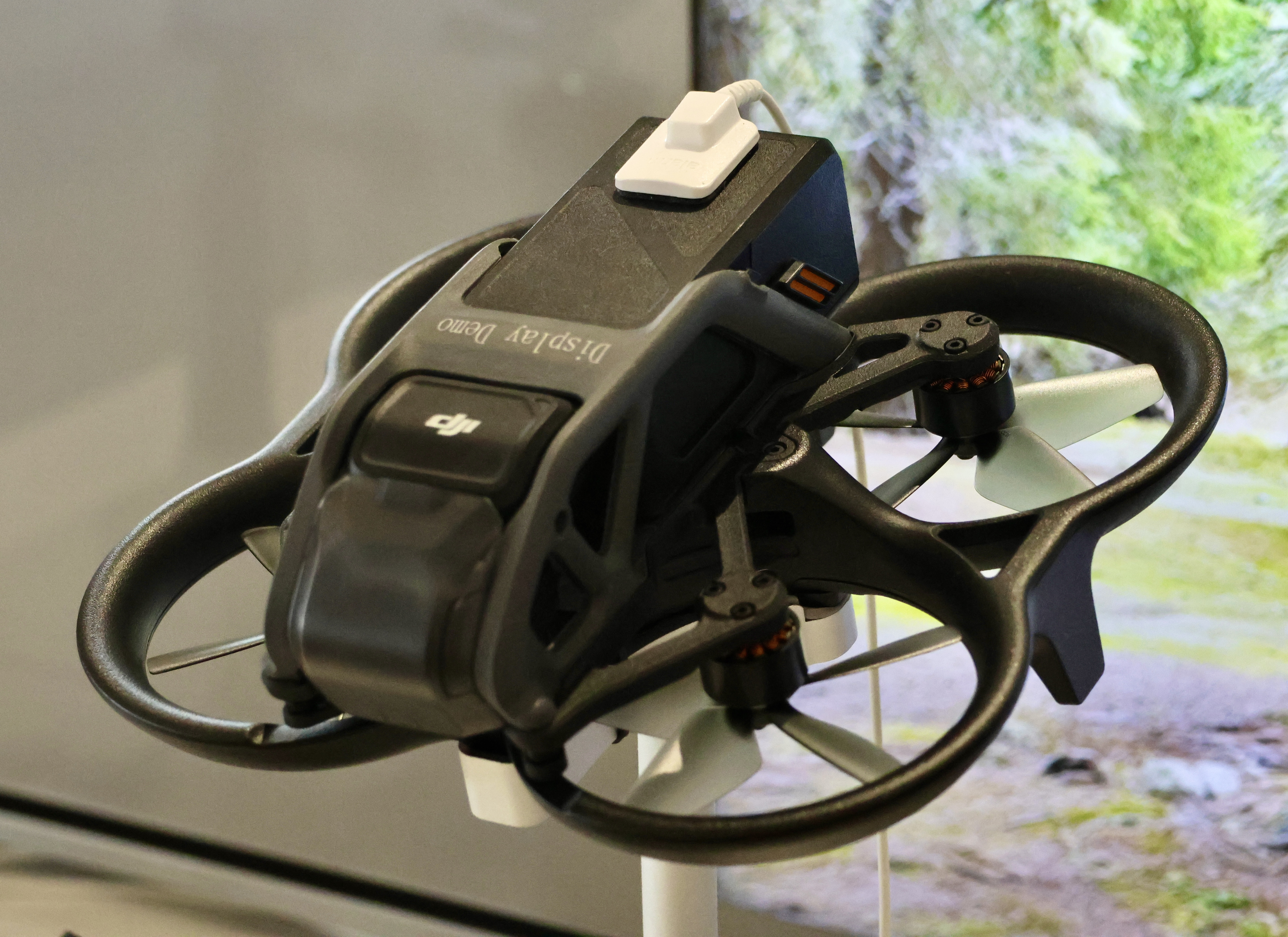
An original Avata display model

The Avata was announced in August 2022 as DJI's first FPV cinewhoop drone. (Note: A "cinewhoop" is a type of FPV drone designed to capture cinematic footage.) The drone is a quadcopter and is smaller than the preceding DJI FPV, weighing only 410 g (14 oz), and has built-in propeller guards. The Avata lacks the three-axis gimbal and collision avoidance system typical of DJI's camera drones, though it does have downward-facing cameras and infrared sensors for maintaining altitude. The Avata has a 48-megapixel camera with a 1/1.7" CMOS sensor, capable of shooting 4K video at 60 frames per second, and uses an O3+ transmission system to transmit video to the pilot's goggles. The drone has an ADS-B receiver to alert the pilot of nearby aircraft, and has 20 gigabytes of internal storage, allowing it to capture footage even when no MicroSD card in inserted. The Avata also has a "Turtle mode", which flips the drone upright in the event of an upside-down landing. Power is provided by a 2420 mAh battery, giving the Avata a flight time of 18 minutes.

The Avata has three flight modes; "Normal", "Sport", and "Manual". Both Normal and Sport modes use GNSS and the downward-facing sensors for stabilization. Normal mode also uses GNSS for location holding, and the maximum speed is limited to 8 m/s (29 km/h; 18 mph). In Sport mode, GNSS is only used for stabilization, allowing for increased agility and a maximum speed of 14 m/s (50 km/h; 31 mph). Manual mode disables both GNSS and the downward-facing sensors, allowing for maximum maneuverability and a top speed of 27 m/s (97 km/h; 60 mph).

An improved model, the Avata 2, was announced in April 2024. The Avata 2 features a flatter and wider polycarbonate frame than its predecessor, weighing 377 g (13.3 oz), and a 12MP camera with a larger 1/1.3" sensor. The drone also has downward and rear-facing collision avoidance sensors, 46GB of internal storage, and an O4 video transmission system. Battery capacity was decreased to 2150 mAh, though flight time was increased to 23 minutes.

In November 2025, official promotional images of a new model, the Avata 360, were leaked to the public. A potential competitor to the Antigravity A1, the Avata 360 will be the first DJI drone with a 360-degree camera.

== Variants ==
Avata
Company designation Model QF2W4K. Original variant with a 48MP 1/1.7" CMOS camera, an O3+ transmission system, 20GB of internal storage, and a 2420 mAh battery giving it a flight time of 18 minutes. Announced in August 2022.
Avata 2
Company designation Model QF3W4K. Improved model with a redesigned frame, reduced weight, a 12MP 1/1.3" CMOS camera, rear-facing collision avoidance sensors, 46GB of internal storage, an O4 transmission system, and a 2150 mAh battery giving it a flight time of 23 minutes. Announced in April 2024.
Avata 360
Company designation Model DVN3NT. Improved model with a 360-degree camera.

== Operators ==
China

- The People's Liberation Army used the Avata during a training exercise in 2024.

Israel

- The Israel Defense Forces used the Avata during the Gaza war to map Hamas tunnel networks and to track Palestinian detainees being used as human shields.

== Specifications (Avata 2) ==
Video of the Chicago and North Western Roundhouse taken with an Avata.

Data from

General characteristics

- Length: 0.185 m (7 in)
- Width: 0.212 m (8 in)
- Height: 0.64 m (2 ft 1 in)
- Empty weight: 0.377 kg (1 lb)
- Battery : 2150 mAh 14.76 V (31.7 Wh) Li-ion Intelligent Flight Battery
- Powerplant: 4 × brushless DC electric motor

Performance

- Maximum speed: 97.2 km/h (60.4 mph, 52.5 kn)
- Range: 13 km (8.1 mi, 7.0 nmi)
- Endurance: 23 minutes
- Service ceiling: 5,500 m (18,000 ft)
- Rate of climb: 9 m/s (1,800 ft/min)

Avionics

- Camera: 12MP 1/1.3" CMOS
- GNSS compatibility: GPS, Galileo, BeiDou
- Transmission system: O4

== See also ==
Aircraft of comparable role, configuration, and era

- Antigravity A1
- DJI Mini
