= FAA Reauthorization Act of 2018 =

United States Law

- Long title: To provide protections for certain sports medicine professionals, to reauthorize Federal aviation programs, to improve aircraft safety certification processes, and for other purposes
- Enacted by: the 115th United States Congress

Citations
- Public law: Pub. L. 115–254 (text) (PDF)
- Statutes at Large: 132 Stat. 3186

Codification
- Acts amended: FAA Modernization and Reform Act of 2012

Legislative history
- Introduced in the House of Representatives by Brett Guthrie (R‑KY) on January 5, 2017; Passed the House of Representatives on January 9, 2017; Passed the US Senate on September 6, 2018 with amendment; House of Representatives agreed to US Senate amendment on September 26, 2018 (Voice Vote) with further amendment; US Senate agreed to House of Representatives amendment on October 3, 2018 (93-6); Signed into law by President Donald Trump on October 5, 2018

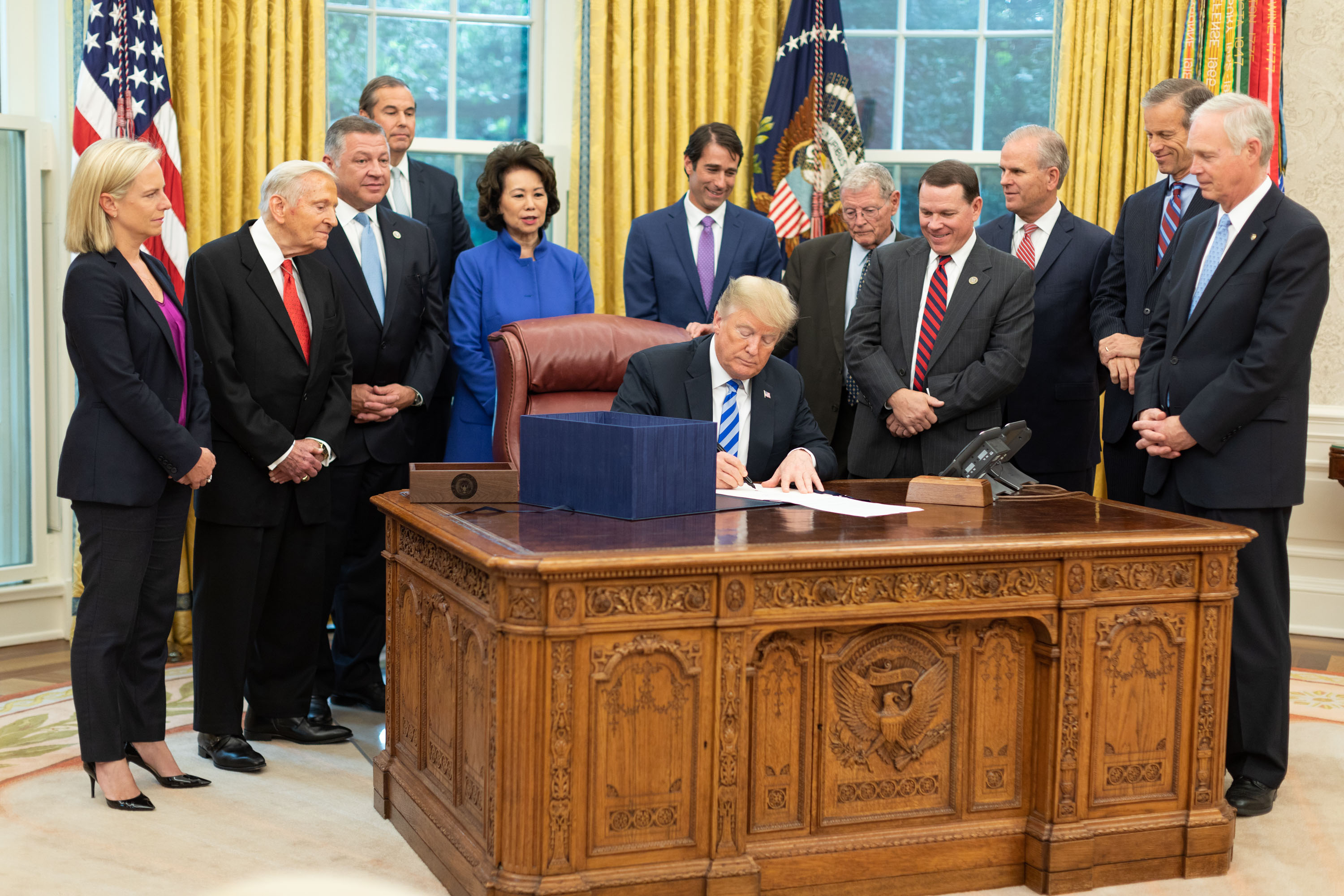
President Trump signing the FAA Reauthorization Act of 2018 into law.

The FAA Reauthorization Act of 2018 (H.R. 302, Pub. L. 115–254 (text) (PDF)) is a United States federal law, enacted during the 115th United States Congress, which reauthorizes the Federal Aviation Administration (FAA) and other programs until the end of fiscal year 2023. The bill was passed by Congress on October 3, 2018, and was signed by President Donald Trump on October 5, 2018.

== Background ==
Funding for the Federal Aviation Administration had been extended by continuing resolution, since the passage of the last authorization Act in 2012. The preceding law, the FAA Modernization and Reform Act of 2012 (P.L. 112-95), provided funding for the FAA and related programs from FY 2013 to FY 2015. After the expiration the act, Congress passed various short-term funding extensions, without agreement on multi-year reforms and aviation policy.

== Summary ==
Passage of the law authorized five-year funding (FY 2018-2023) for the FAA, for the first instance since 1982. The law contains a provision that requires the FAA to set a standard for the minimum size of airline seats. The law also bans the use of electronic cigarettes on aircraft. Provisions were also made for how to handle the presence of unmanned aircraft around airports. The law extended the FAA's authority over small recreational drones (small unmanned aircraft systems or sUAS). It tightly curtailed the statutory exception for small hobbyist drones and made clear that they are generally subject to the same rules regarding registration and marking, remote identification, and “maintaining the safety and security of the national airspace system” as applied to other UAS.

The law appropriated $1.68 billion towards the federal response to Hurricane Florence, which made landfall in the Southeastern United States while the bill was being considered by Congress.

== Provisions and Short Titles ==
- Better Utilization of Investments Leading to Development Act of 2018 (BUILD Act of 2018)
- Commercial Balloon Pilot Safety Act of 2018
- Concrete Masonry Products Research, Education, and Promotion Act of 2018
- Disaster Recovery Reform Act of 2018
- FAA Leadership in Groundbreaking High-Tech Research and Development Act (FLIGHT R&D Act)
- FAA Reauthorization Act of 2018
- Fairness for Pilots Act
- Geospatial Data Act of 2018
- Maritime Security Improvement Act of 2018
- National Transportation Safety Board Reauthorization Act
- Preventing Emerging Threats Act of 2018
- Saracini Aviation Safety Act of 2018
- Securing General Aviation and Charter Air Carrier Service Act
- Sports Medicine Licensure Clarity Act of 2018
- Transparency Improvements and Compensation to Keep Every Ticketholder Safe Act of 2018 (TICKETS Act)
- TSA Modernization Act

== See also ==
- Remote ID
