= White Fox (fashion brand) =

Australian fast fashion business

- Type: Privately owned
- Industry: Fashion
- Area served: Australia
- Products: Clothing, accessories
- Website: whitefoxboutique.com.au

White Fox is an Australian fast fashion business first established as an eBay retail business in 2013. The business expanded to the United States in 2019 and the United Kingdom in 2024. The business was started by Greek Australian entrepreneurs Daniel and Georgia Contos.

In September 2025, White Fox expanded into beauty with the launch of White Fox Vol 1. The Beauty + Lifestyle Collection, a range of beauty and lifestyle products.
