= FAA Order 8130.34 =

Airworthiness Certification

Airworthiness Certification of Unmanned Aircraft Systems
- FAA Publication
- Abbreviation: FAA Order 8130.34
- Status: Active
- First published: 27 March 2008
- Latest version: D 8 September 2017
- Organization: Federal Aviation Administration AIR-600
- Domain: Airworthiness certification
- Website: Order 8130.34D

FAA Order 8130.34D, Airworthiness Certification of Unmanned Aircraft Systems, establishes procedures for issuing either special airworthiness certificates in the experimental category or special flight permits to unmanned aircraft systems (UAS), optionally piloted aircraft (OPA), and aircraft intended to be flown as either a UAS or an OPA.

Airworthiness Certification of Unmanned Aircraft Systems, establishes procedures for issuing this certification, and as such establishes guidance standards for certification aspects of development and operation, which may be addressed by adoption of such standards as ARP4754A, and DO-178C.

Obtaining an experimental airworthiness certificate for a particular UAS is currently the only way civil operators of unmanned aircraft are accessing the National Airspace System (NAS) of the United States. Moreover, the Order establishes that such aircraft may enter the NAS only with a safety pilot monitoring its controls.

Adoption of ARP4754, DO-178C, DO-254, DO-278, and other related guidance standards to UAS programs is rapidly growing because of the certification requirements established with this FAA Order.
