= RaceDayQuads v. FAA =

American federal court case regarding drones

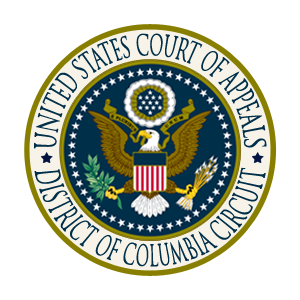
- Court: United States Court of Appeals for the District of Columbia
- Full case name: Tyler Brennan and Racedayquads LLC, v. Stephen Dickson, Administrator and Federal Aviation Administration
- Decided: July 29, 2022
- Citation: No. 21-1087 (D.C. Cir. Jul. 29, 2022)

Court membership
- Judge sitting: Cornelia Pillard

RaceDayQuads, LLC v. FAA, also known as Brennan v. Dickson, was a 2022 United States court case heard in the DC Federal Court of Appeals in which the online store RaceDayQuads attempted to challenge the constitutionality and legality of the Federal Aviation Administration's recent remote ID ruling and decision to require that all unmanned aerial vehicles (drones) in US airspace to continuously transmit the location of both the drone and its operator during all operations. The suit, filed by RaceDayQuads owner and CEO Tyler Brennan, was intended to "save the drone industry", including drone racing by using "FPV drones".

The suit ultimately failed at the DC Appeals Court, which, in an opinion written by federal judge Cornelia Pillard, sided with the FAA's arguments. RaceDayQuads has yet to announce if it's appealing the motion to the Supreme Court.

== Background ==
On December 31, 2019, the FAA filed a notice of proposed rulemaking regarding remote ID and its new provisions and later published remote ID as a federal ruling in January 2021, with the ruling becoming effective in April 2021. The FAA's website claims it reviewed all comments regarding remote ID. The rule states that 30 months after the rule becomes effective, all drone operators, including consumer drone operators, in US airspace must comply with the new ruling via either built-in remote ID or retrofitting older drones with remote ID modules at the expense of the consumer; businesses and drone manufacturers must comply within 18 months of the rule becoming effective. The FAA additionally states that a drone, when not in an FAA-cleared community drone fly zone where remote ID is not required, must transmit its location from takeoff to shutdown. The FAA's reasoning for remote ID procedures is to assist law enforcement in prosecuting reckless and unlawful operations of drones.

RaceDayQuads CEO Tyler Brennan formally announced his intention to sue the FAA via a blog post on RaceDayQuads' website, which states a lawsuit will be filed should the FAA include "unconstitutional provisions" in the final ruling of remote ID. On March 17, 2021, RaceDayQuads announced the lawsuit was officially filed, and he soon posted a link to a GoFundMe campaign supporting the lawsuit. In preceding posts on the same site as the official announcement, Brennan stated that drone hobbyists under a remote ID law would be more vulnerable to harassment, which would only be bolstered by Brennan's prediction that companies like ADT Inc would profit from remote ID by selling drone alerts, an additional risk of harassment for pilots. Furthermore, in the March 17th post, Brennan claims that remote ID deadlines were postponed not to respect the drone community nor allow time to comply, but rather that remote ID infrastructure would not be ready until the compliance deadline.

The FAA released an official reply to the suit on October 15, primarily stating its belief in its remote ID rule not being a violation of privacy nor inconsiderate of the drone community. The FAA cited how its original remote ID rule was modified because of a vast amount of negative comments regarding the original rule's requirement for transmitting drone identification information over the internet. The FAA defended its requirement of control station location stating its use of the data does not violate Fourth Amendment-related constitutional data protections or that remote ID data is an unreasonable "search" without warrant, and that even if remote ID was a violation of the fourth amendment, that special needs associated with public safety and national security would allow for such search.

RaceDayQuads subsequently released a reply brief disputing nearly all of the points made in the FAA's official reply, stating it strongly believes that no special need exemption applies in note of the Fourth Amendment, and that the mandatory installation of GPS technology in unmanned aerial vehicles is an unconstitutional search. Brennan and his legal team subsequently stated that comments from the general public were not considered into implementation, despite the FAA initially backing off of broadcast remote ID.

=== Public opinions ===
The drone community has been generally against the provisions that Brennan and RaceDayQuads are fighting. YouTube drone commentator 51 Drones heavily criticized the transmission of a drone pilot's location to "anyone with a cell phone", stating that educating law enforcement on drone regulations would be a major challenge, and that the usage of "community outreach" to combat members of the population against the operation of drones would be severely ineffective against those wishing to track down, harass, and rob drone operators.

Additional articles and research institutions also provided stark opposition to remote ID's requirement for drone operators to transmit control station location; the Consumer Technology Association, through Digital Privacy News, released surveys which revealed 90% of those surveyed were uncomfortable with control station location transmission, and that 40% of respondents would be less inclined to buy a drone per these requirements. Ryan Latourette, a director at Great Lakes Drone Co in Michigan, additionally blasted Remote ID's disregard for privacy and prioritization for complete transparency and how "anyone at all with a cell phone" could determine where a drone operator is and what drone they are flying. Jeramie Scott from the Electronic Privacy Information Center commented while businesses might still attempt to collect information about actively-flying drones, the FAA has barely cared about the privacy implications of drones in the national airspace.

In contrast to many hobbyists, WhiteFox, a California-based company specializing in airspace security, praised the remote ID rule in January 2021. WhiteFox claims that remote ID will open up drone operations beyond visual line of sight and will assist authorities in regulating drone activity. Chinese drone manufacturer DJI also supported the final rule, stating it has long supported rules that would serve the whole drone industry.

=== Constitutional arguments ===
Brennan and RaceDayQuads believes that tracking GPS location violates the Fourth Amendment. Their argument alleges that FRIAs create a forced association with a private, dues-collecting organization to exercise privilege in the public airspace. This, the suit argues, is a violation of the First Amendment. RaceDayQuads additionally disputes that a private entity being able to deny access to public services violates Fifth Amendment protections.

== Decision ==
On July 29, 2022, the RaceDayQuads appeal was denied by the United States Court of Appeals for the District of Columbia Circuit. Judge Cornelia Pillard ruled that the constitutional arguments made against remote ID's implementation were frivolous and/or dependent on applications of the rule and not the rule itself. Brennan's concerns that the rule was made with ex party influence was also found to be not firmly supported with evidence either, and that the FAA followed Congress's instructions in consulting with the independent RTCA and NIST.

With regard to the remote ID rule's finalization on "community designated areas" where remote ID would not be required, the court agreed that the FAA's response was reasonable. The court ruled that the FAA did adequately respond to comments questioning the safety rationale for its remote ID rule, and that RaceDayQuads' "dissatisfaction with the substance of the response" was not a legitimate ground to invalidate the rule.
