= WhiteFox Defense =

American aerospace company

WhiteFox Defense Technologies
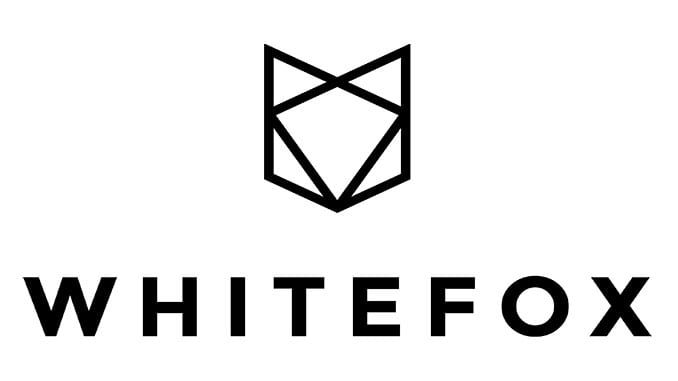
- Industry: Drone airspace security
- Founded: 2012
- Founder: L.R. Fox
- Headquarters: California
- Website: https://www.whitefoxdefense.com

WhiteFox Defense Technologies, Inc. is a US-based drone airspace security company that manages drones in sensitive airspace founded in 2012 in California.

== Overview ==
The company currently has three products that control unauthorized drones flying in a particular airspace.

According to Wall Street Journal, WhiteFox provided data that "drone incursions into the Los Angeles airport’s restricted airspace nearly tripled from 2019 to 2020, with a high of roughly 1,200 flights last June". FAA included WhiteFox in DHS trials.

In 2018, WhiteFox manufactured a radio-jamming product which permits authorized drones to fly while forces unauthorized drones out of restricted airspace. WhiteFox partnered with Gryphon Sensors, a company that provides drone detection and unmanned aircraft systems.

In April 2021, WhiteFox and the U.S. Department of Homeland Security Science and Technology Directorate joined a cooperative research and development agreement.

== Awards ==
WhiteFox received an award for 'Counter Drone Systems (Anti-Drones)' in 2021 by Airwards.
