= Remote ID =

US Federal regulation on unmanned aerial systems

Unofficial remote ID compliance label

Remote ID (RID) is a digital identification system that allows a flying drone to broadcast its identity, location, and flight data in real-time.

The UK's Direct Remote ID, America's FAA Remote ID and the EU's Direct Remote Identification (DRI) share broadcast concepts (Direct - local radio broadcast, Networked using an internet service and hybrid combining the two) but have different requirements

is there is additionally an international standard specification for Unmanned Aircraft System (UAS) Remote ID called ASTM F3411

== America ==
In the USA it is a regulation of the US Federal Aviation Administration (FAA) that requires registered drones—unmanned aircraft systems or UAS—to broadcast certain identifying and location information during flight, akin to a digital license plate for drones. Remote ID regulations are codified in Part 89 of the Code of Federal Regulations. It is part of the regulation of UAVs in the United States.

Two types of Remote ID are available: standard remote identification, and remote identification modules. FAA-Recognized Identification Areas (FRIAs) are defined geographic areas such as model airfields where unregistered drones can be flown without Remote ID equipment. Outside of FRIAs, drones that are required to be registered (or that are registered) must have Remote ID, regardless of whether the operator is licensed.

Remote ID information is meant to be broadcast to the public and readable by smart phones and similar devices. ASTM Open Drone ID defines broadcasts over Wi-Fi for longer ranges and Bluetooth for shorter ranges.

=== Small unmanned aircraft systems (sUAS) ===
The FAA classifies drones under 55 pounds (25 kg) as small unmanned aircraft systems (sUAS). These systems can operate either as limited recreational operations under the FAA Reauthorization Act of 2018 exception, or under Part 107 with more stringent requirements such as licensing.

Recreational operators must pass an aeronautical knowledge and safety test, The Recreational UAS Safety Test (TRUST). Test administrators run the gamut, from the Academy of Model Aeronautics (AMA) and Boy Scouts of America to the University of Arizona Global Campus.

Recreational drones over 0.55 lb (250 g) must be registered.

=== Equipment ===
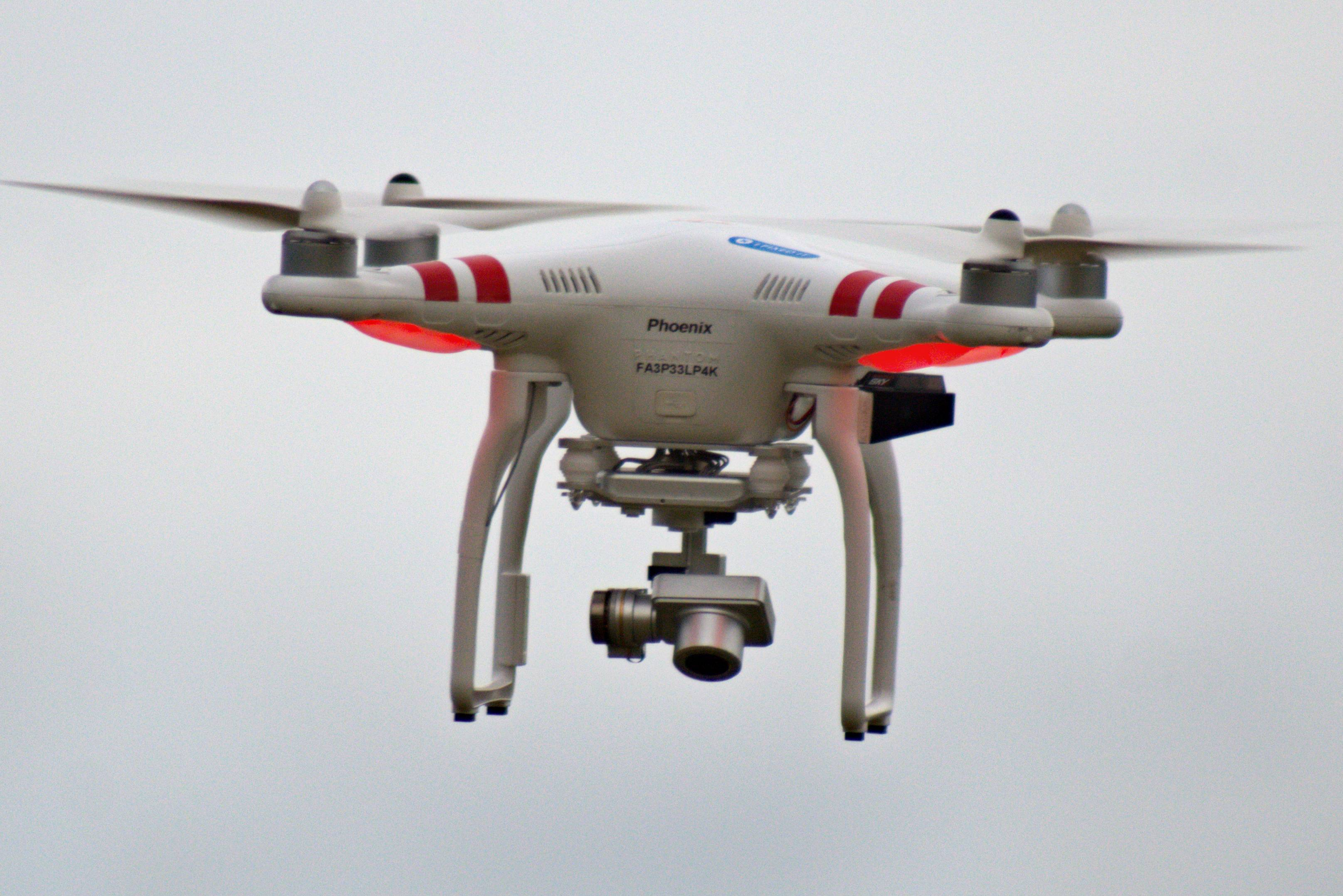
A DJI Phantom 2 Vision+ – a model built before remote ID was required in the United States – flying with an external remote ID module mounted at the base of its left leg.

Remote ID compliance with one of the three methods is required. Standard remote identification hardware, which is factory-installed before sale, is one such method. Operators without standard hardware can still comply by using removable remote ID modules, which can be added to any UAS as needed. The third option is a FAA-Recognized Identification Area (FRIA) where drones can be flown without any remote ID equipment.

=== FAA-Recognized Identification Area (FRIA) ===
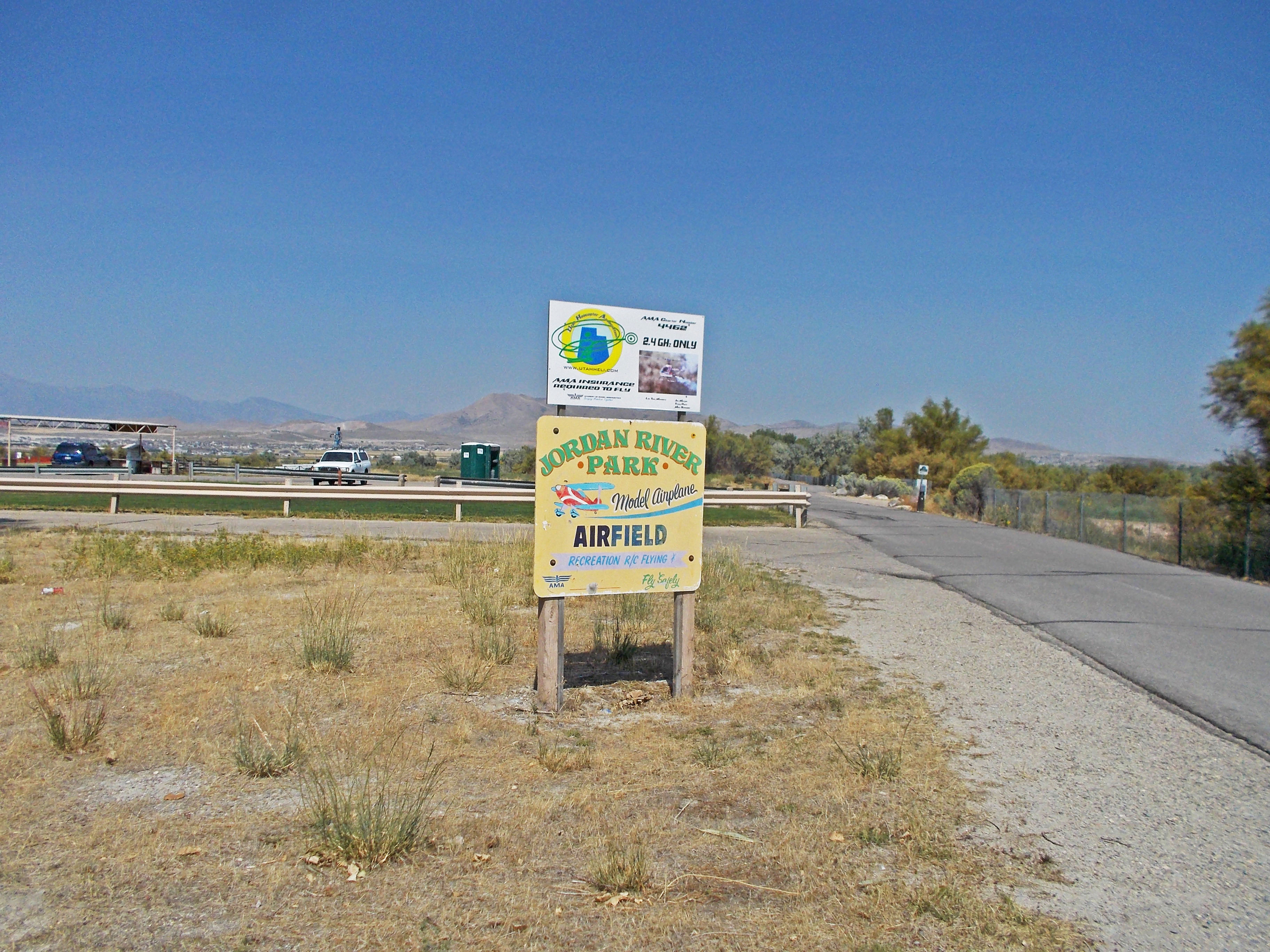
An Academy of Model Aeronautics (AMA) model airfield FRIA along the Jordan River in Utah

FAA-Recognized Identification Areas (FRIAs) are defined geographic areas where drones can be flown without Remote ID equipment, though if a registered drone has Remote ID equipment it must broadcast while operating.

=== Technical specifications ===
Remote ID information is meant to be broadcast to the public and readable by smart phones and similar devices. The FAA accepts the ASTM F3586 standard as a means of compliance (MOC), which overlays and modifies ASTM F3411 to make it fully align with regulatory requirements, though it's not the only means of demonstrating compliance.

The ASTM F3411 standard for very-low-level UAS specifies Open Drone ID broadcasts with common consumer electronics on the 2.4 GHz and related ISM radio bands:

- Wi-Fi for longer range messages, either in beacon frames or NAN service discovery frames on channels 6 and 149. Wi-Fi Neighbor Awareness Networking (NAN, Wi-Fi Aware) service discovery frames are NAN-specific 802.11 public action frames.
- Bluetooth Low Energy (BLE) for short range messages. BLE advertising packets are transmitted on channels 37, 38, and 39.

ASTM F3411 Open Drone ID defines an application layer, including messages for identifiers, location, altitude, direction, speed, and other information. Libraries such as the Open Drone ID Core C Library provide application programming interfaces (APIs) for applications. One might also use wpa_supplicant, for example with its NAN control interface commands.

== History ==
The FAA Modernization and Reform Act of 2012 called on the FAA to regulate small drones to integrate them into the National Airspace System. The FAA then promulgated the Part 107 regulations for the operation of small UAS (sUAS) in 2016. The FAA Extension, Safety, and Security Act of 2016 directed the FAA to develop the capacity to remotely locate drones in flight and contact their operators as needed to ensure regulatory compliance. And in the FAA Reauthorization Act of 2018, Congress made clear that recreational sUAS are generally subject to the same rules regarding registration and marking, remote identification, and "maintaining the safety and security of the national airspace system" as applied to other unmanned aircraft and unmanned aircraft systems.

The final Remote ID rule and Part 89 regulations were published in the Federal Register on January 15, 2021. The effective date of the rule was March 16, 2021, with exception of amendatory instruction 19, while subpart C was effective September 16, 2022. Operators of sUAS were required to be in compliance by 16 September 2023 and the FAA ended its discretionary enforcement period 16 March 2024.

In the RaceDayQuads v. FAA case, also known as Brennan v. Dickson, the online store sought to overturn the rule on constitutional and procedural grounds, arguing it violated the Fourth Amendment and exceeded FAA authority. The suit was intended to "save the drone industry", including drone racing by using "FPV drones". The suit ultimately failed at the DC Circuit, which in an opinion written by federal judge Cornelia Pillard sided with the FAA's arguments.

The FAA Reauthorization Act of 2024 directed the FAA to review the Remote ID rule to determine whether unmanned aircraft manufacturers and operators can meet the intent of the rule through alternative means of compliance, including through network-based remote identification.

== Europe ==
The prEN 4709-002 standard defines three mandatory and one optional communication protocols.

- Bluetooth 4 Legacy (optional)
- Bluetooth 5 Long Range (mandatory)
- Wi-Fi Beacon (mandatory)
- Wi-Fi NAN (mandatory)

EU regulation 2019/945 enforces that all drones above 250 grams flying below 120 meters in the Open or Specific category must be equipped with Remote ID systems that allow wireless access to the UAS Operator ID.

regulation 2019/947 requires drone operators to affix their UAS Operator ID (issued by the National authority) to the drone. By doing this, drone operators are accountable for damages they cause if their drone is physically found.

== United Kingdom ==
From 1 January 2026, there is a legal requirement for operators to fly some drones with Direct RID enabled, depending on their class mark.
