= Aerial survey =

Method of collecting geophysical data from high altitude aircraft

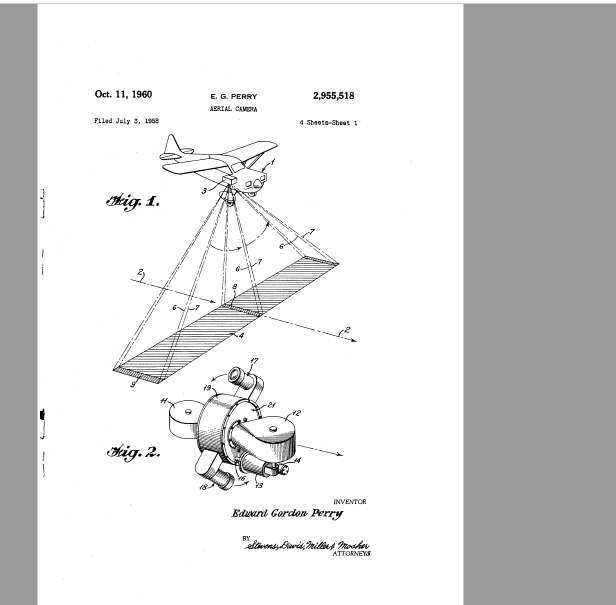
Aerial Camera used during WWII for military purposes by the US Army against enemy's submarines

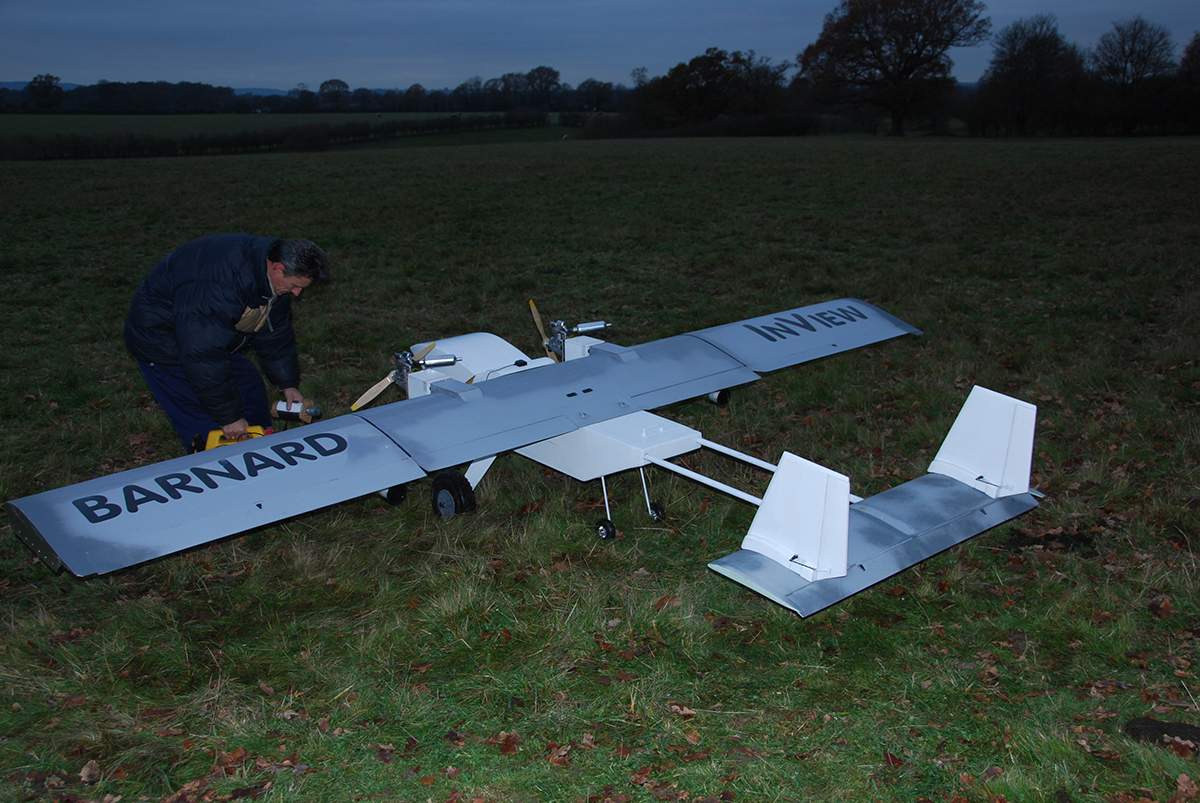
The InView UAV for use in aerial survey applications

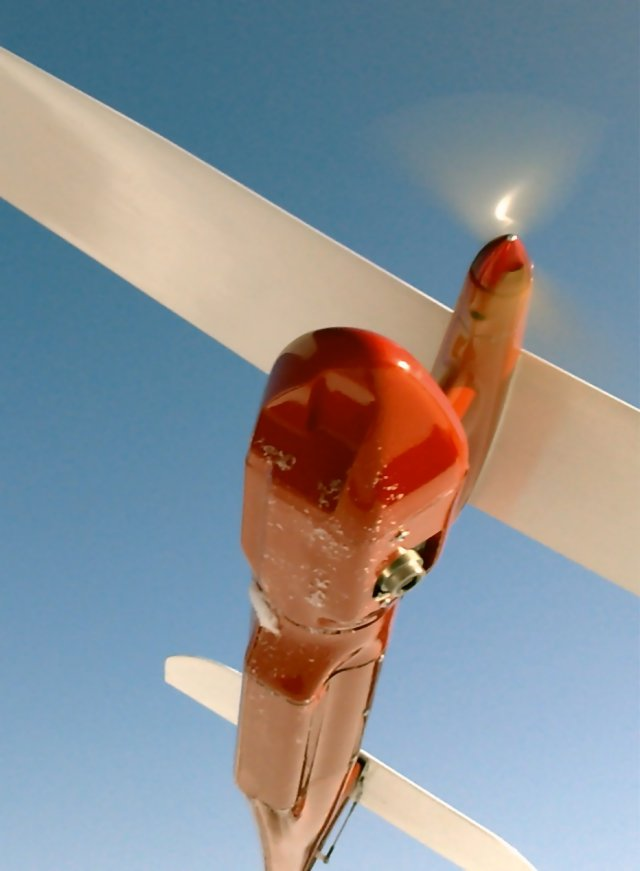
Pteryx UAV, a civilian for aerial photography and photomapping with roll-stabilized camera head

Aerial survey is a method of collecting geomatics or other imagery data using airplanes, helicopters, UAVs, balloons, or other aerial methods. Typical data collected includes aerial photography, Lidar, remote sensing (using various visible and invisible bands of the electromagnetic spectrum, such as infrared, gamma, or ultraviolet) and geophysical data (such as aeromagnetic surveys and gravity measurements). It can also refer to a chart or map made by analyzing a region from the air. Aerial survey should be distinguished from satellite imagery technologies because of its better resolution, quality, and resistance to atmospheric conditions that can negatively impact and obscure satellite observation. Today, aerial survey is often recognized as a synonym for aerophotogrammetry, a part of photogrammetry where the camera is airborne. Measurements on aerial images are provided by photogrammetric technologies and methods.

Aerial surveys can provide information on many things not visible from the ground.

== Terms used in aerial survey ==
exposure station or air station
the position of the optical center of the camera at the moment of exposure.
flying height
the elevation of the exposure station above the datum (usually mean sea level).
altitude
the vertical distance of the aircraft above the Earth's surface.
tilt the angle between the aerial camera and the horizontal axis perpendicular to the line of flight.
tip
the angle between the aerial camera and the line of flight.
principal point
the point of intersection of the optical axis of the aerial camera with the photographical plane.
isocentre
the point on the aerial photograph in which the bisector of the angle of tilt meets the photograph.
nadir point
the image of the nadir, i.e. the point on the aerial photograph where a plumbline dropped from the front nodal point pierces the photograph.
scale
ratio of the focal length of the camera objective and the distance of the exposure station from the ground.
azimuth
the clockwise horizontal angle measured about the ground nadir point from the ground survey North meridian in the plane of photograph.
orthomosaic
A high-resolution map created by orthophotos, usually via drones is termed as an orthomosaic. Ortho meaning a nadir image and mosaic meaning a collection of images.
Temporal Resolution
Time between observations.

== Uses ==
Aerial surveys are used for:

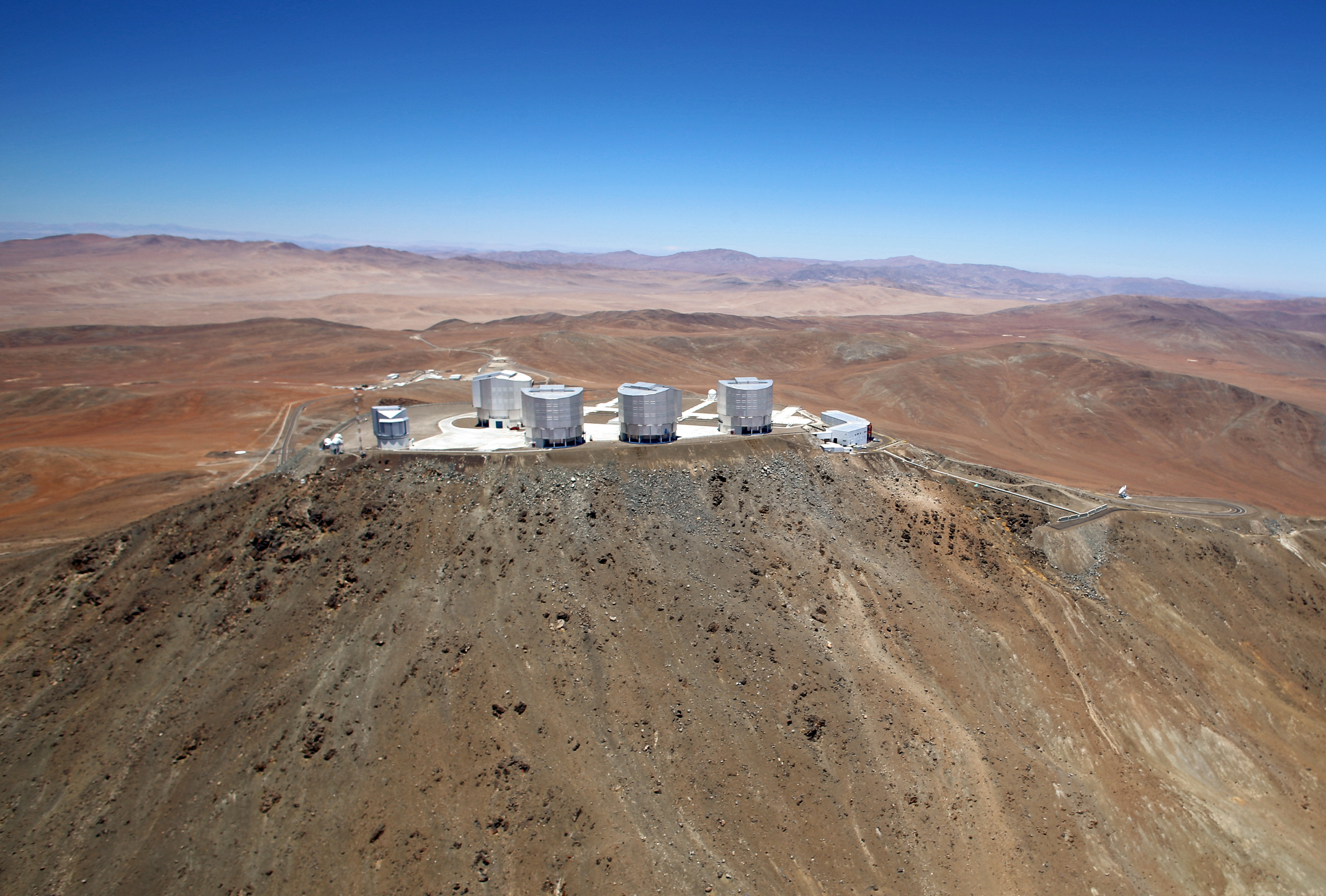
Aerial view of the Paranal Observatory, created by the non-profit initiative Wings for Science, which offers aerial support to public research organisations

- Archaeology
- Fishery surveys
- Geophysics in geophysical surveys
- Hydrocarbon exploration
- Land survey
- Mining and mineral exploration
- Monitoring wildlife and insect populations (called aerial census or sampling)
- Monitoring vegetation and ground cover
- Reconnaissance
- Transportation projects in conjunction with ground surveys (roadway, bridge, highway)

Aerial surveys use a measuring camera where the elements of its interior orientation are known, but with much larger focal length and film and specialized lenses.

== Sensors ==
In order to carry out an aerial survey, a sensor needs to be fixed to the interior or exterior of the airborne platform with line-of-sight to the target; it is remotely sensing. With manned aircraft, this is accomplished either through an aperture in the skin of the aircraft or mounted externally on a wing strut. With unmanned aerial vehicles (UAVs), sensors are often mounted under or inside the vehicle, allowing for rapid data collection over challenging terrains, though sometimes with less precision than traditional methods.

Aerial survey systems typically include the following components:

- Flight navigation software to guide the pilot in flying the desired survey pattern.
- GNSS, combining GPS and an inertial measurement unit (IMU) to provide accurate position and orientation data.
- Gyro-stabilized mounts to counteract the effects of aircraft roll, pitch, and yaw.
- Data storage units to securely save the recorded data.

Examples of aerial survey sensors include:

- Vexcel UltraCam today consists of four photogrammetric nadir and oblique cameras (Eagle, Falcon, Osprey, Condor) and their calibrations.
- Leica ADS100
- WaldoAir XCAM
- RIEGL LMS-Q780
- Trimble AX80
- Gpixel GMAX32152 / GMAX32103

== Use of drones ==
Unmanned aerial vehicles (UAVs) or drones have been user to take photos for photogrammetry. Instruments manufactured for UAVs could be mounted on unmanned flying platforms of various sizes and types, such as octocopters. These machines are suitable for the full geodetic survey of a study site by creating a point cloud of measurements of nearly homogeneous quality and accuracy. These detailed point clouds (of various types of data) could be used in line with orthophotos etc. to obtain a complex data system representing the study site.

Similarly to manned aerial surveys, UAVs are suitable to acquire three-dimensional digital models and orthophoto mosaics for a certain area.

The biggest downside of this technology is that these UAVs, especially the smaller ones, could survey only a smaller area.

Disadvantages

- Smaller UAVs are only able to survey smaller areas.
- The payload of the flying platforms is quite limited.
- The legal procedures are more complicated and lengthy than the ones for manned aerial vehicles (e.g. airplane kites).
- Reliable flying platforms of good quality are very expensive

Advantages

- The machinery could be transported to the study site by car, thus transportation costs are low.
- The deployment of the machinery is flexible.
- It can operate and produce measurements in cloudy conditions.
- The maintenance, storage, and running costs of unmanned platforms are cheaper than the same expenses of conventional aircraft. Moreover, the smaller high-quality unmanned platforms are more efficient, productive, and more durable than the conventional unmanned aircraft which could amortize quickly.

== See also ==
- OpenDroneMap
