= SRF =

SRF may refer to:

== Organisations ==
- Sudan Revolutionary Front, alliance of armed groups formed in 2011
- Syria Revolutionaries Front, formed in December 2013
- Schweizer Radio und Fernsehen, German-language broadcaster in Switzerland
- SRF Limited, an Indian manufacturing company
- SENS Research Foundation, on the medicine of ageing, Mountain View, California, USA
- Supercentenarian Research Foundation, on why supercentenarians live longer than most and why they die
- Sevin Rosen Funds, a Texas-based venture capital firm

== Science and technology ==
- Self-resonant frequency, a frequency at which an electronic component naturally resonates due to parasitic impedance, such as stray capacitance
- Serum response factor, in genetics
- Server Response File, ATL Server
- Solid recovered fuel, from waste
- Superconducting radio frequency technology, superconductors in RF devices
- .srf, computer file extension for a raw image file

== Other ==
- Self-Realization Fellowship, spiritual organization
- Silk Road Fund, Chinese state backed investment fund
- SleepResearch Facility, a musician
- Spec Racer Ford, a class of racing car
- State revolving fund, a type of fund administered by a US state
- Scholar Rescue Fund, a fund that provides fellowships to scholars whose lives are threatened in their home countries
- Strategic Rocket Forces of the Russian Federation
- Systematic reconnaissance flight, a scientific method in wildlife survey
