= Lockheed Martin Desert Hawk III =

2006 American UAV

Desert Hawk III
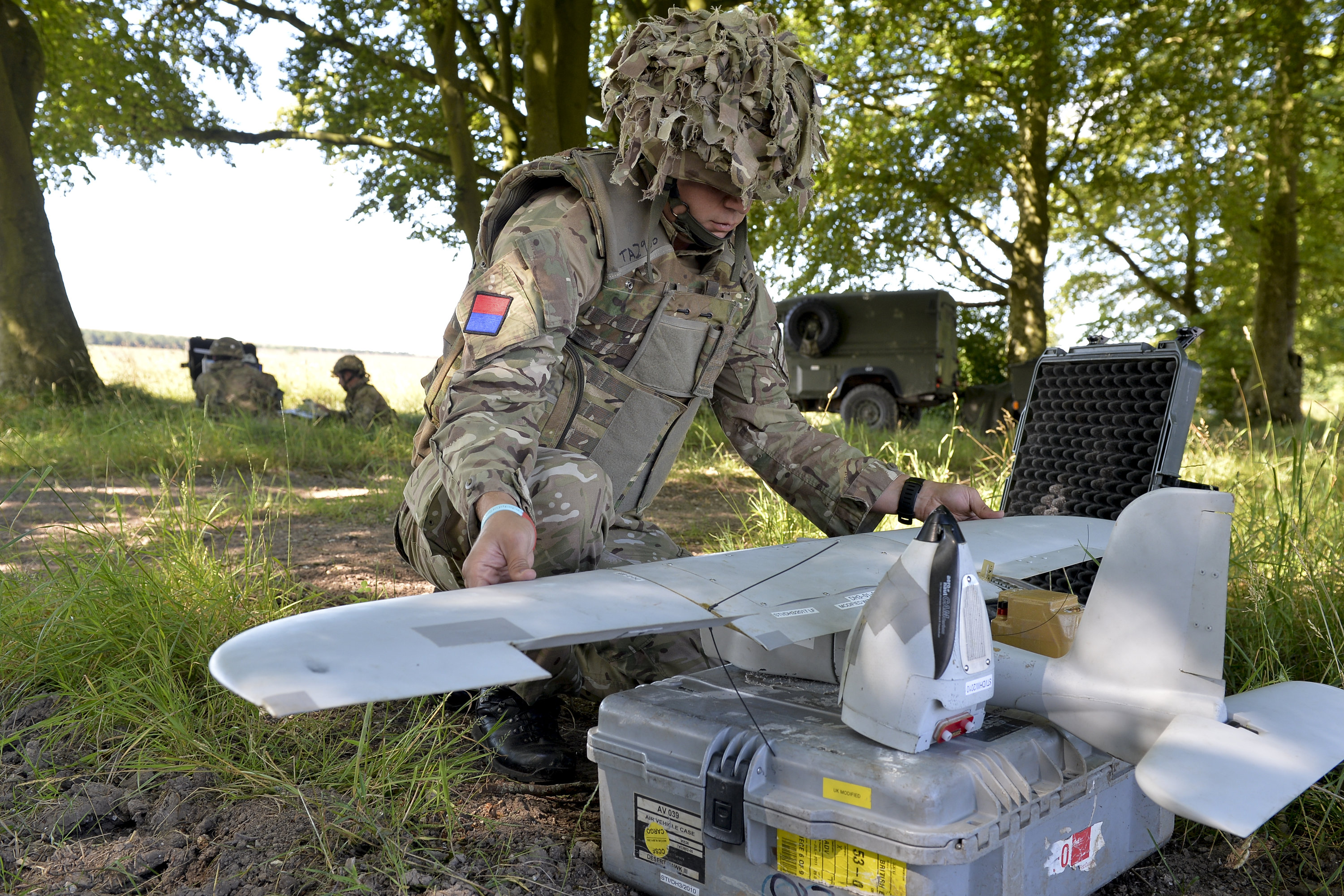
- A Royal Artillery soldier assembling a Desert Hawk III

General information
- Type: UAV
- National origin: United States
- Manufacturer: Lockheed Martin
- Primary user: British Army

History
- First flight: 2006

The Lockheed Martin Desert Hawk III (DHIII) is a miniature UAV designed by the Lockheed Martin Aeronautics in 2006. It is a small surveillance drone, which is mainly used by the United Kingdom, but has also been used by the United States for reconnaissance and recovery missions.

== Design and development ==
The Desert Hawk III was created by the Skunk Works team at Lockheed Martin as an update to the original Desert Hawk, which was developed in 2002 with its first actual flight coming in 2003. The original is slightly smaller and heavier than the DHIII, and the DHIII can stay in the air over thirty minutes longer.

The Desert Hawk III is made out of a special polypropylene material. Polypropylene is mouldable when heated to a high enough temperature and returns to a solid state when the temperature is lowered back to normal. Polypropylene was chosen because of its flexibility and ability to protect the device with its rugged surface.

=== Powerplant ===
The DHIII has one electric motor driving the quiet propeller located on the nose of the plane. The motor was chosen to minimize the sound level produced by the vehicle, allowing it to get closer to a subject during missions without being heard.

=== Radar and Intelligence packages ===
There are three different intelligence packages used by the DHIII:

- Synthetic aperture radar (SAR): Creates images by using radio waves that bounce off surfaces, then measuring the echos. The SAR can be used in all weather conditions, while still providing an accurate image.
- Signals intelligence (SIGINT): Intercepts electronic signals, and either records them as new information or matches them to known data.
- Communications intelligence (COMINT): Intercepts electronic signals, specifically communication between people, and records the information. COMINT is used to find out who transmitted the signal, their location, and how long the signal lasted.

=== Sensors and cameras ===
The DHIII is equipped with the following sensors and cameras:

- Infrared sensors, which detect heat.
- Electro-optical sensors, which detect changes in light.
- Long wave infrared imager (LWIR), which is a unique camera that captures thermal images to show differences in heat.
- Laser illuminator, which records video when it is dark with night vision technology.

=== Ground Control Station ===
The Ground Control Station (GCS), the Desert Hawk III's remote control system, is a large briefcase that contains all of the tools needed to operate up to four Desert Hawks at once. It is equipped with tracking capabilities, multiple antennas for proper connectivity, and it is operated by a remote control similar to an Xbox 360 Controller. The GCS is portable and weighs 15 pounds (6.8 kg).

The GCS programs flight patterns for missions into the DHIII. Then, when the vehicle is in flight, the GCS uses the autopilot function to perform the programmed flights. The autopilot function allows the operator of the DHIII to focus on using the sensors, radars, and cameras to gather the needed information during the mission. However, the operator is in control during launch and landing sequences.

=== Performance ===
The DHIII is a hand-launched aircraft with specific techniques for launching and landing the vehicle.

=== Launch technique ===
The DHIII is launched manually. After the launch the ground control station takes over with the flight commands.

=== Landing technique ===
As the DHIII does not have wheels, it does not land like most airplanes do. It is important that the vehicle lands as close to horizontally as possible. To perform a proper skid landing, the operator must take into account, the angle of descent, the wind, and the terrain on which the vehicle is landing. The operator of the DHIII may bring the device around multiple times to make sure the landing goes smoothly. The aircraft is designed to break apart on impact, to dissipate its kinetic energy without causing damage to the components so they can be reused.

== Operational history ==
The first order of Desert Hawk IIIs was made by the British Army in 2006. They were used by the Royal Artillery and the 32nd Regiment in Iraq. In late 2007, the United Kingdom Ministry of Defense signed a contract, worth $4.8 million, with Lockheed Martin for more DHIIIs.

In 2013, there was a total 222 Desert Hawk IIIs in service for the British army, which was almost 40% of all drones in service. It was also reported that 412 DHIIIs had crashed, broken down, or been lost behind enemy lines between the years 2008 and 2013.

== Specifications (Desert Hawk III) ==
General characteristics

- Wingspan: 4 ft (1.2 m)
- Empty weight: 6 lb (3 kg)
- Gross weight: 8 lb (4 kg)
- Powerplant: 1 × electric motor

Performance

- Maximum speed: 50 kn (57 mph, 92 km/h)
- Minimum control speed: 30 kn (35 mph, 56 km/h)
- Range: 8.1 nmi (9.3 mi, 15 km)
- Endurance: 90 minutes
- Service ceiling: 11,000 ft (3,400 m)
