= RCM =

RCM may refer to:

== Organisations ==
=== United Kingdom ===
- Royal College of Music, London
- Royal College of Midwives
- Royal Cornwall Museum

=== Canada ===
- Royal Canadian Mint
- The Royal Conservatory of Music
- Rassemblement des citoyens et des citoyennes de Montréal (Montreal Citizens' Movement), a former municipal political party in Montreal, Quebec

== Science and technology ==
- Nintendo Switch Recovery Mode
- Reliability-centered maintenance, a maintenance planning approach based on reliability and safety system assessment
- Reciprocating Chemical Muscle, a mechanism that takes advantage of the superior energy density of chemical reactions
- Resonant clock mesh, technology used in the AMD Piledriver (microarchitecture)
- Restrictive cardiomyopathy
- Revenue cycle management, the process used by healthcare systems in the United States to track revenue from patients
- Reverse Cuthill–McKee algorithm, an algorithm to reduce the bandwidth of sparse symmetric matrices
- Ring-closing metathesis, a variation on olefin metathesis
- Rotor current meter, a mechanical current meter used in oceanography
- RADARSAT Constellation Mission, three-spacecraft fleet of Earth observation satellites operated by the Canadian Space Agency
- Reflection Contrast Microscopy, or Interference reflection microscopy, a type of optical microscopy
- Regulatory Compliance Mark, an Australian conformity mark

== Other uses ==
- Rapid Communications in Mass Spectrometry, a scientific journal
- Regimental Corporal Major, a warrant officer appointment in the British Household Cavalry
- Regional county municipality, a territorial subdivision of Quebec
- Rockefeller Capital Management, an American wealth management company
- Rokos Capital Management, a British wealth management company
- RCM, IATA code for Richmond Airport, Australia
- Refugee Children's Movement, the organization which carried out the Kindertransport of children from Nazi Germany
