= Lockheed Martin Desert Hawk =

Miniature unmanned aerial vehicle

Desert Hawk
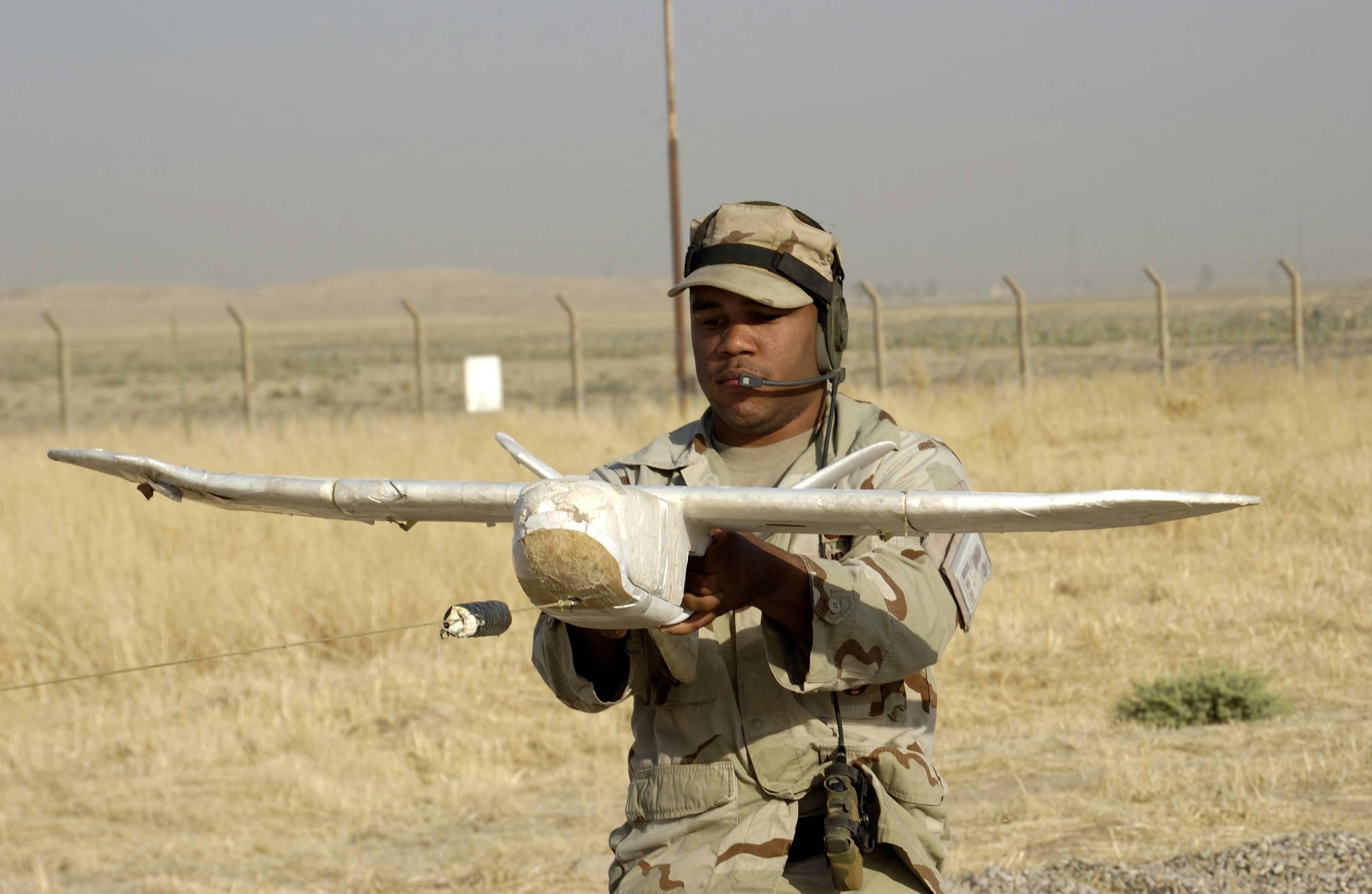
- Desert Hawk preparing to be launched.

General information
- Type: Remote-controlled UAV
- Manufacturer: Lockheed Martin
- Primary user: British Army

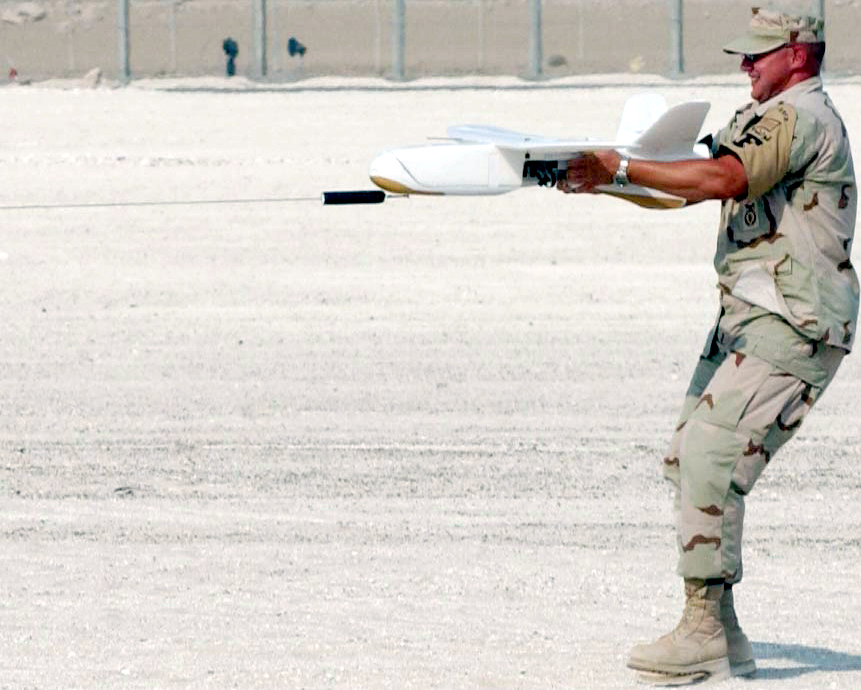
Desert Hawk being launched with a bungee cord

The Lockheed Martin Desert Hawk is a miniature UAV used for base perimeter protection. It was designed by Lockheed Martin's Skunk Works for the United States Air Force Force Protection Airborne Surveillance System (FPASS) Program on a quick-reaction contract issued late in the winter of 2002, with the first system delivered in the early summer. It was designed quickly, because the program leveraged technology and design studies developed for the MicroStar MAVs. The program was run by Electronic Systems Center. In 2007, the U.S. Air Force FPASS office switched all of their UAV systems over to the RQ-11B Raven.

It is made mostly of plastic foam, resembling hobby grade model airplanes, and uses an electric motor driving a pusher propeller as a powerplant, making it very quiet. It is launched with a bungee cord, carries three small CCD cameras, has an endurance of about an hour. It flies mostly under autonomous control, with the operator keeping track of its activity with a laptop computer.

The Desert Hawk is also used by the 32nd Regiment Royal Artillery of the British Army as a tactical surveillance system, and has been used in Afghanistan and Mali.

Desert Hawk has since been replaced with the more capable and rugged Desert Hawk III.

== Specifications ==
- Wingspan: 52 in (1.32 m)
- Length: 34 in (0.86 m)
- Battery Weight(1.5kg)
- Weight: 7 lb (3.2 kg)
- Engine: electric motor driving a quiet pusher propeller
- Endurance: approx. 1 hour
