= Baykar Malazgirt Helicopter UAV =

Turkish miniature unmanned aerial vehicle

Malazgirt Mini UAV
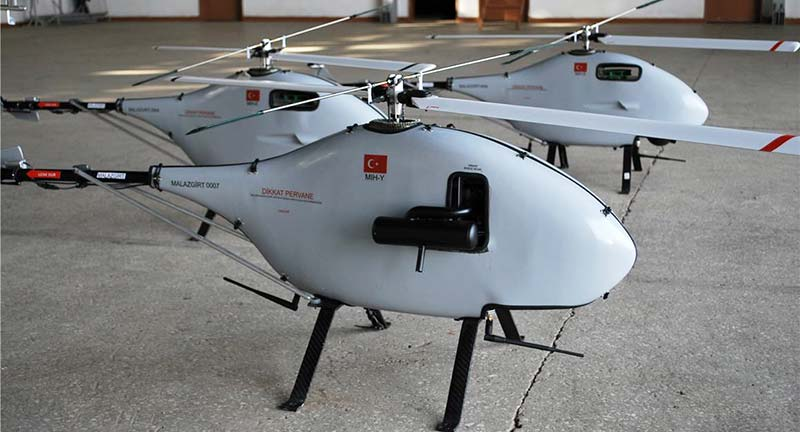
- Type: Mini UAV
- Place of origin: Turkey

Service history
- Used by: Turkey

Production history
- Designer: Baykar
- Manufacturer: Baykar
- Produced: 2006

Specifications
- Payload capacity: 12kg
- Operational range: 15km

Malazgirt Mini UAV was a Miniature UAV produced by Turkish company Baykar.

It is named after the famous victory at the Battle of Manzikert in 1071.

It was in production in 2012, and no longer in production in 2026.

== Operators ==
- Turkey
