= IAI Bird-Eye =

Family of mini-UAVs

Bird-Eye
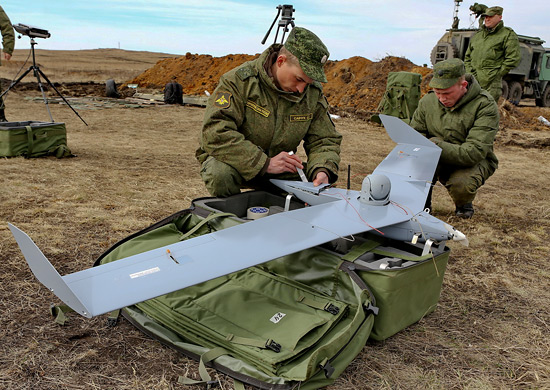
- The Bird-Eye 400 in Russian Armed Forces service

General information
- Type: Reconnaissance UAV
- National origin: Israel
- Manufacturer: IAI Malat division.

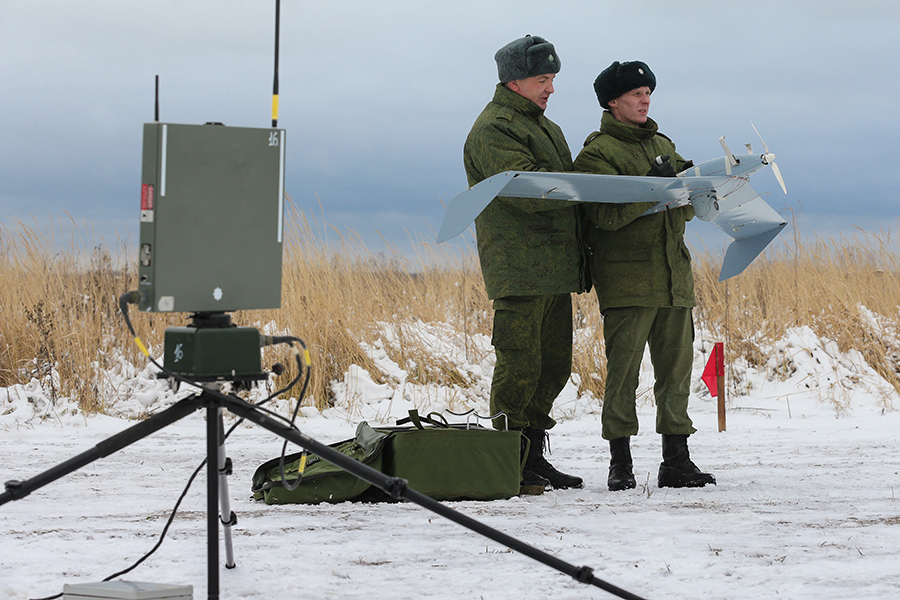
The Bird-Eye 400 in Russian Armed Forces service

IAI Bird-Eye is a family of mini-UAVs developed by Israel Aerospace Industries (IAI) Malat division. Designed for military and paramilitary intelligence, surveillance and reconnaissance missions.

== Production and delivery ==
The development of the IAI Bird-Eye began in 2003, in preparation for bidding in a tender of Israel's Administration for the Development of Weapons and Technological Infrastructure, for the supply of mini-UAVs models for initial evaluation. The operational need for a mini-UAVs was identified in the wake of the Second Intifada, when in March 2002, the IDF decided to purchase Aeronautics Defense Systems services for intelligence missions. The company's mission was to launch drones into the Gaza Strip and the West Bank to monitor the Palestinian Authority's activities. In January 2004 a demonstration competition was held, in which IAI drones, Elbit Systems and Rafael Advanced Defense Systems competed, among others. After the competition, the IDF announced that it preferred the Elbit Skylark and eventually won an official tender few years later. IAI decided to continue developing the Bird-Eye for international markets.

In March 2009 Israel and Russia signed a contract to supply IAI Bird-Eye 400 reconnaissance drones, in an attempt to improve its unmanned aircraft fleet, after a poor performance in the Russo-Georgian War. Where the Defense Forces of Georgia used the Elbit Hermes 450, which is also made in Israel. The deal was the first-ever purchase publicly announced by Russia of Israeli military hardware.

In December 2009 media reports suggested that Russia is negotiating a second purchase of Israeli drones, roughly twice the size of an initial $50 million sale agreed in March. In October 2010, Israel Aerospace Industries announced that it signed a $400 million agreement to sell unmanned aerial vehicles components to Russia's Oboronprom, for a production line of UAV to be assembled in Russia (the announcement didn't indicate which UAV models are involved in the deal).

In February 2015 Israel Aerospace Industries and India's Alpha Design Technologies signed an agreement for the production and marketing of mini-Unmanned Aerial Systems in India, covering IAI's Bird-Eye 400 and Bird-Eye 650 models. The companies announced that production of the systems will take place in India, while Integration of additional applications and subsystems will be performed by Alpha in India with IAI's support.

In June 2016 Israel Aerospace Industries announced that it has begun serial production of hundreds of Bird Eye 650D Small Tactical Unmanned Aerial System (STUAS). A model that can conduct autonomous missions including point takeoff and point recovery, at ranges of up to 150 km and endurance of up to 15 hours. IAI announced that it has "Commercial applications", including: "mapping, monitoring oil, gas and electrical distribution lines, management of water and pollution over land and maritime areas, and rapid surveillance of disaster areas."

In January 2019 IAI signed an agreement with Brazilian company "Santos Lab" to provide BirdEye 650D UAVs, which "Santos Lab" will operate, for large scale precision agricultural applications.

In September 2020 IAI announced that it signed an agreement to acquire 50% of BlueBird Aero Systems, an Israeli developer and integrator of small tactical UAVs. Following the acquisition IAI combined its tactical UAV lines with BlueBird's. In June 2021, the company annuaced a deal to sell 100 UAVs to a European customer.

== Variants ==
Name	Takeoff mass	payload	wingspan	length	endurance	range
Bird-Eye 100	1.3 kg		85 cm	80 cm	1 hour	5 km
Bird-Eye 400	4.1 kg	1.2 kg	2.2m	0.8m	80 min	15 km
Bird-Eye 500	5 kg	0.9 kg	2m	1.5 m	1 hour	10 km
Bird-Eye 600	8.5 kg	1.5 kg			2 hours	10 km
Bird-Eye 650	11 kg	1.2 kg	3m		>4 hours	20 km
Bird-Eye 650D	30 kg	5.5 kg	4m		15 hours	150 km
