= EMT Aladin =

German military unmanned aerial vehicle

EMT Aladin (German: Abbildende Luftgestützte Aufklärungsdrohne im Nächstbereich, airborne reconnaissance drone for close area imaging) is a small, man-portable light reconnaissance miniature unmanned aerial vehicle (UAV) employed by the Bundeswehr (German Army).

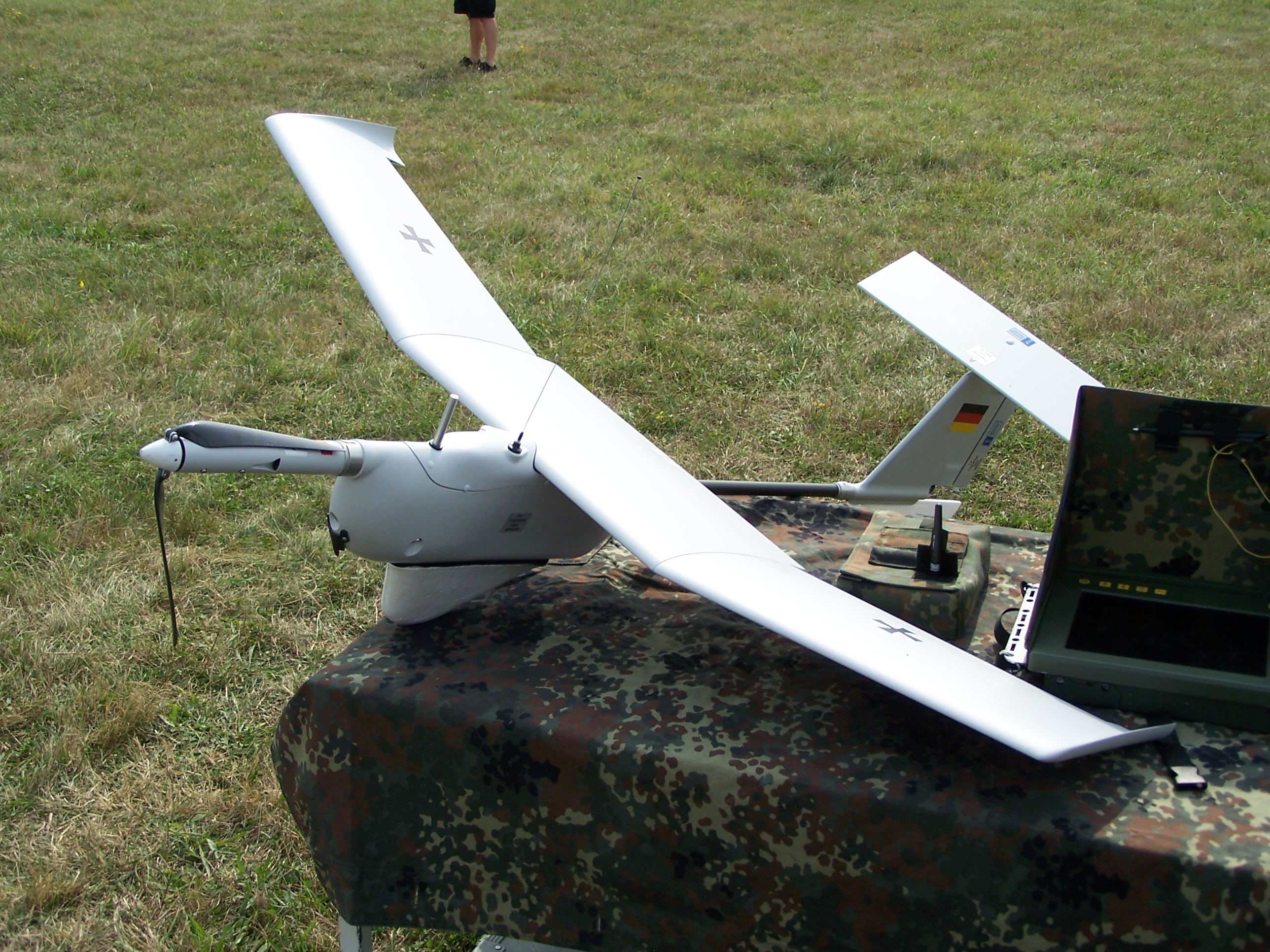
An Aladin UAV of the German Army

The UAV can be radio-controlled via a portable control station, or fly according to previously set GPS coordinates. It features a day and night camera and video-relay. It can be transported in two suitcases, which contain the disassembled drone, and a backpack with the control station. The aircraft can be assembled and disassembled without tools in the field within five minutes.

The aircraft can be launched by hand or with a bungee catapult.

This UAV is used by the German Army in the northern part of Afghanistan. In May 2006, The Netherlands bought 10 Aladins for use in southern Afghanistan (Uruzgan), though in 2008 the Dutch program procured 24 systems of the AeroVironment Raven B.

Also Fennek reconnaissance vehicles of the German Army are equipped with Aladin UAVs.

== Specifications ==
=== Air vehicle ===
Sources:

- Wingspan: 1.46 m
- Length: 1.53 m
- Height: 0.36 m (including antenna)
- Mass: 3.20 kg
- Allowed windspeeds: 8 m/s for launch and landing, 10 m/s in flight
- Propulsion: brushless DC electric motor, 12 V
- Battery: lithium ion polymer battery, 14 V, 9 A·h
- Speed: 45–90 km/h
- Range: more than 15 km
- Endurance: 30-60 min
- Altitude: Minimum 30 m above ground, typical 100 – 300 m, ceiling 4.500 m density altitude (ISA)

=== Ground control station ===
- Weight: 17 kg
- Uplink: UHF Band
- Downlink: C Band

== Gallery ==
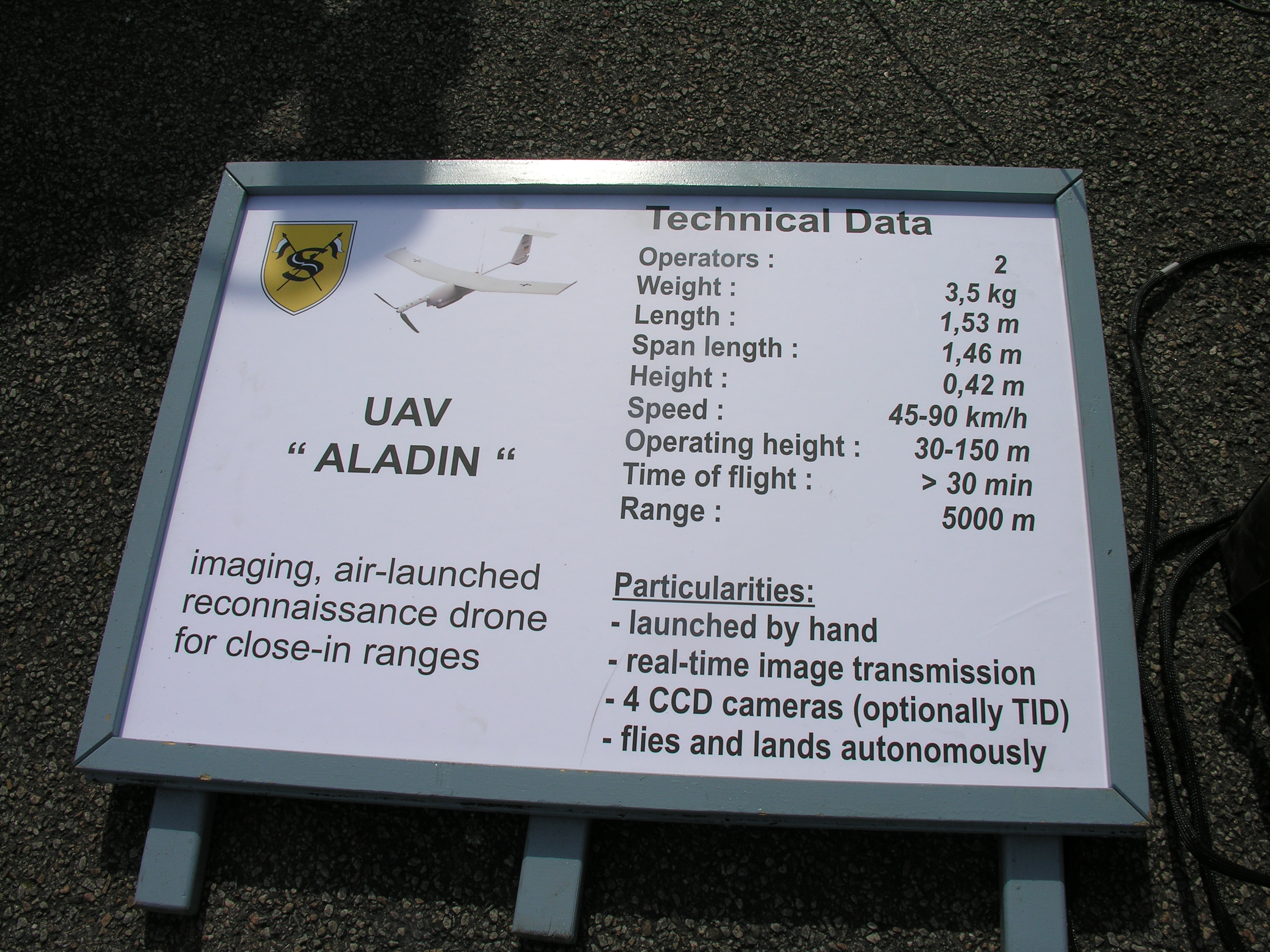
Tactical Data of UAV ALADIN (Germany) on TechDemo'08, 2008

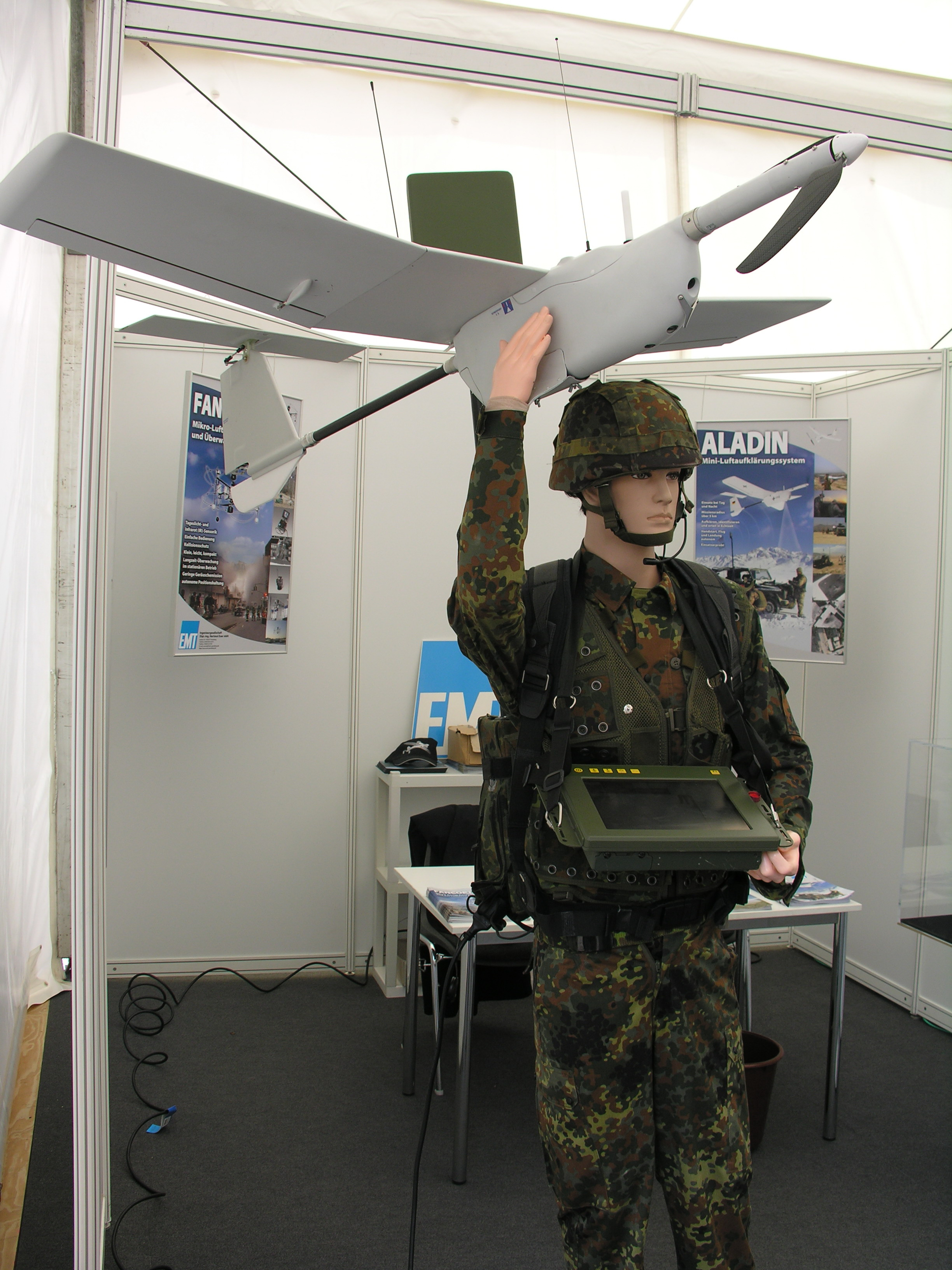
UAV ALADIN (Germany) on TechDemo'08, 2008
