= Aeryon Labs =

Canadian UAV manufacturer

- Industry: Aerospace
- Founded: Waterloo, Canada (2 February 2007)
- Headquarters: Waterloo, Ontario, Canada
- Products: Unmanned aerial vehicles
- Website: www.aeryon.com

Aeryon Labs is a Canadian developer and manufacturer of miniature unmanned aerial vehicles (UAV) headquartered in Waterloo, Ontario. Founded in 2007, it is a subsidiary of Denver, Colorado based company FLIR Systems. The company has produced a variety of VTOL quadcopters unmanned aerial vehicles including the Aeryon Scout and the Aeryon SkyRanger series. Their UAV have been deployed in multiple disasters, conflicts around the world as well as being used by police in Canada. By 2018, the company's UAV had been purchased and put in use by the militaries of 20 countries.

== History ==
The company was founded in 2007 to research and develop VTOL quadcopters unmanned aerial vehicles in Waterloo, Ontario. The company has since expanded to two offices in Waterloo. In 2018, they formed the subsidiary Aeryon Defense USA based in Denver, Colorado to focus on sales to the US Government. Aeryon Labs was subsequently purchased by FLIR Systems in January 2019 for US$200 million.

== Products ==
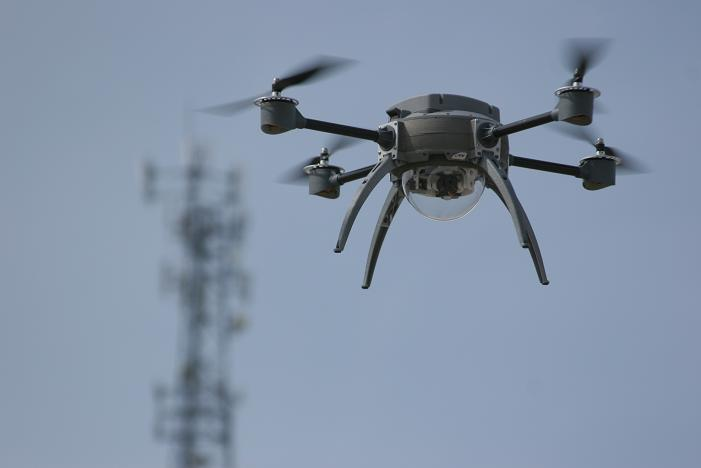
Aeryon Scout in flight

In 2011 the company provided a Scout UAV to the Free Libyan Air Force. In 2014, they were used in the Philippines after Typhoon Hagupit. In 2016, they were used for relief efforts during the Fort McMurray wildfire in 2016 to survey damage. That same year they were sent to Ecuador to survey damage from a 7.8 earthquake. In 2018, the SkyRanger drone provided support for disaster response following Hurricane Irma. In 2024, the Canadian Federal government announced it is donating 800 Aeryon SkyRanger R70 to Ukraine, and they will be delivered by Spring 2024.

Their UAV is also used by police services in Canada including the Thunder Bay police and the Windsor Police Service. Waterloo Regional Police services in 2018 announced they were using one as well and the unit cost $85,172.11. Waterloo police also use them to photograph car crashes, and to help in the search for missing persons.

They are also used to inspect power lines as an alternative to helicopters.

=== Aeryon Scout ===
Aeryon Scout is a small reconnaissance unmanned aerial vehicle (UAV) developed between 2007 and 2009 and produced from 2009-2015.

=== SkyRanger ===
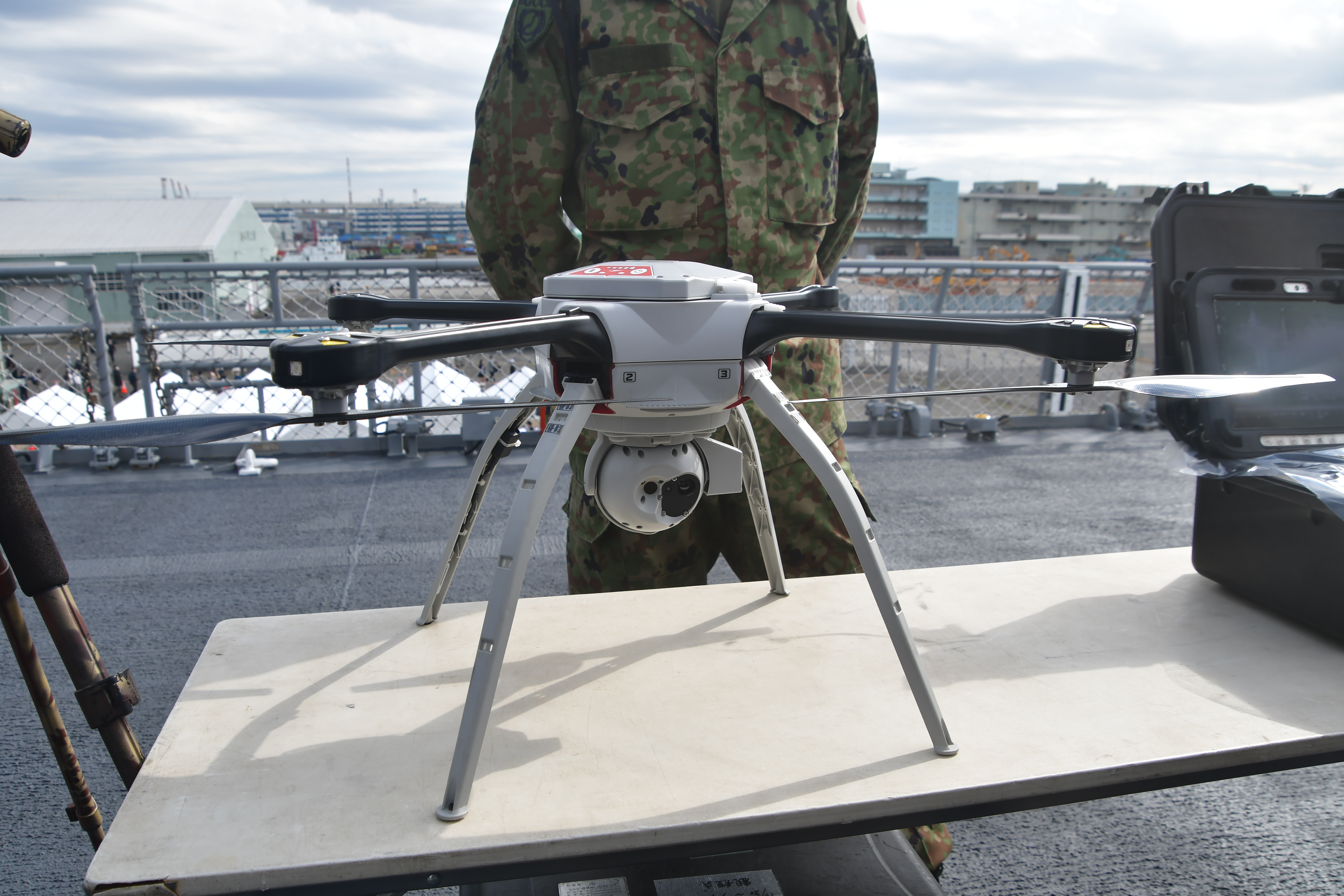
JGSDF UAV (Aeryon SkyRanger R60) aboard on JS Kunisaki(LST-4003) at Port of Yokohama November 5, 2022

Aeryon SkyRanger R60 is a small reconnaissance unmanned aerial vehicle (UAV) developed between 2011–2013. Ontario Provincial Police use the system for traffic accident reconstruction and locating missing persons.

The Aeryon Skyranger R70 is an unarmed aircraft that was launched in 2013, it has been reported to gather intelligence information from more than 30 countries.

R80D SkyRaider was unveiled in 2018 in a trade show in Colorado.
