= Miniature UAV =

Unmanned aerial vehicle small enough to be man-portable

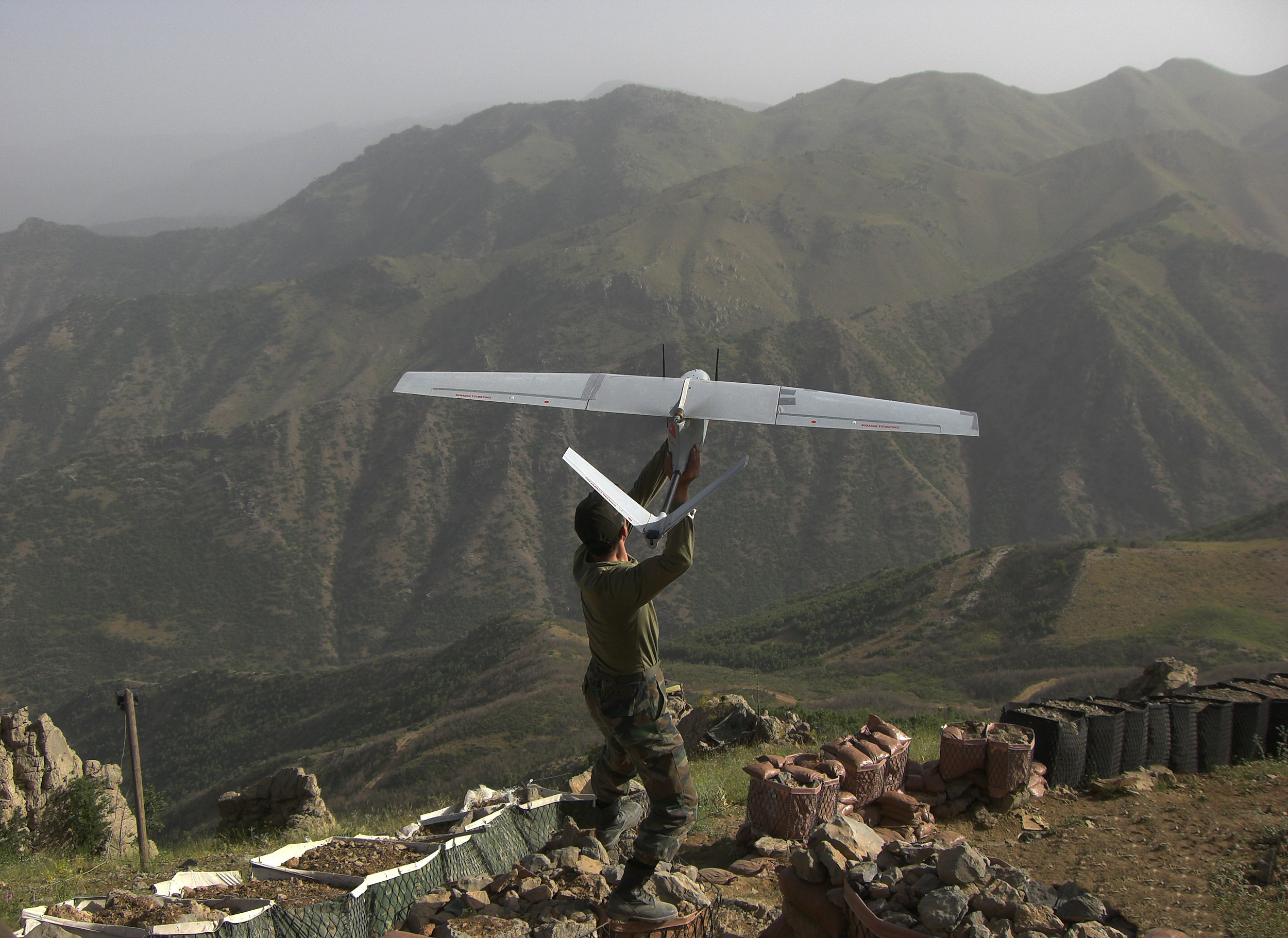
Bayraktar Mini UAV of the Turkish Land Forces

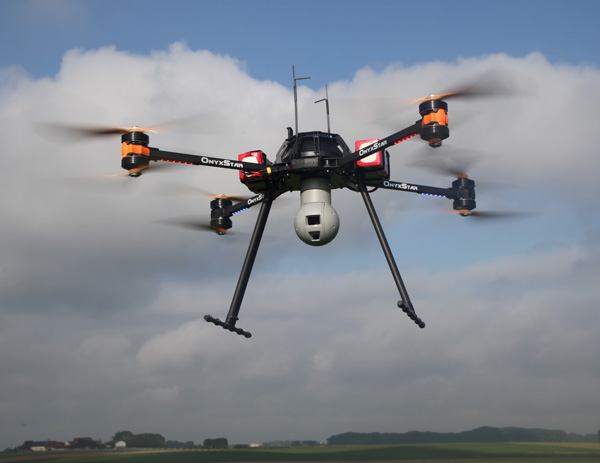
Civil Drone OnyxStar FOX-C8-XT Observer with HD optical zoom 30x and Infrared camera in one

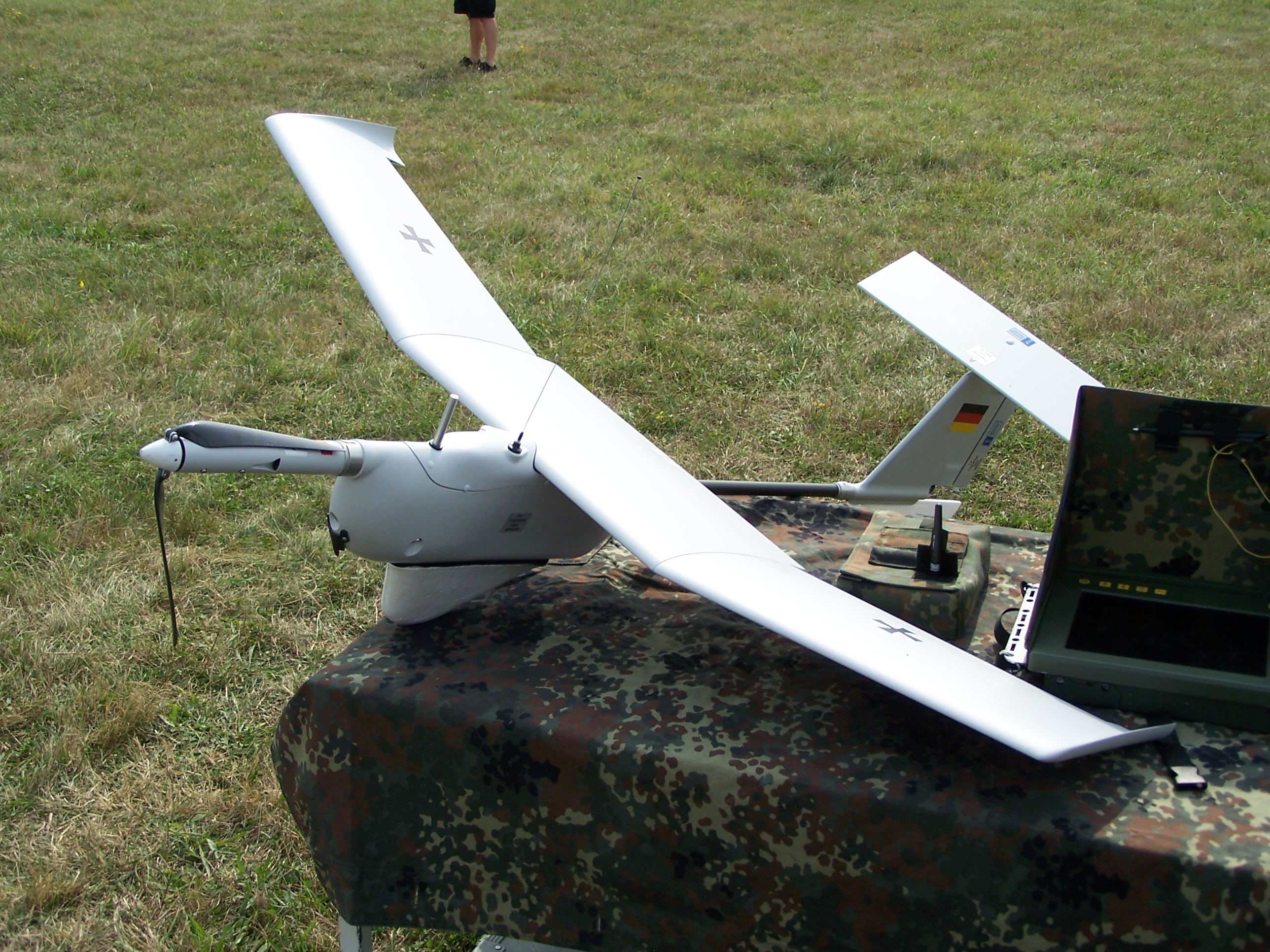
An EMT Aladin of the German Army

A miniature UAV, small UAV (SUAV), or drone is an unmanned aerial vehicle small enough to be man-portable. The smallest UAVs are called micro air vehicle.

Miniature UAVs range from micro air vehicles (MAVs) that can be carried by an infantryman, to man-portable UAVs that can be carried and launched like an infantry man-portable air-defense system. The term is usually applied to those used for military purposes. Military miniature UAVs are generally used for intelligence, surveillance, target acquisition, and reconnaissance (ISTAR) at short range compared to the larger unmanned surveillance and reconnaissance aerial vehicle used for medium to long range missions.

SUAVs have been given various definitions among national regulation authorities, often without including size precisions and differing about weight measurement specifications. Those definitions range from less than 2 kg for Canada to less than 25 kg for the United States. EU's SESAR prospective for the 2020 Air Traffic Management rules also proposed less than 25 kg, while UK's CAA stated less than 20 kg.

== Man-portable UAVs ==
There is a great deal of activity in the small UAV field, with a number of systems acquired and used in combat.

=== AeroVironment "Pointer" and "Raven" ===
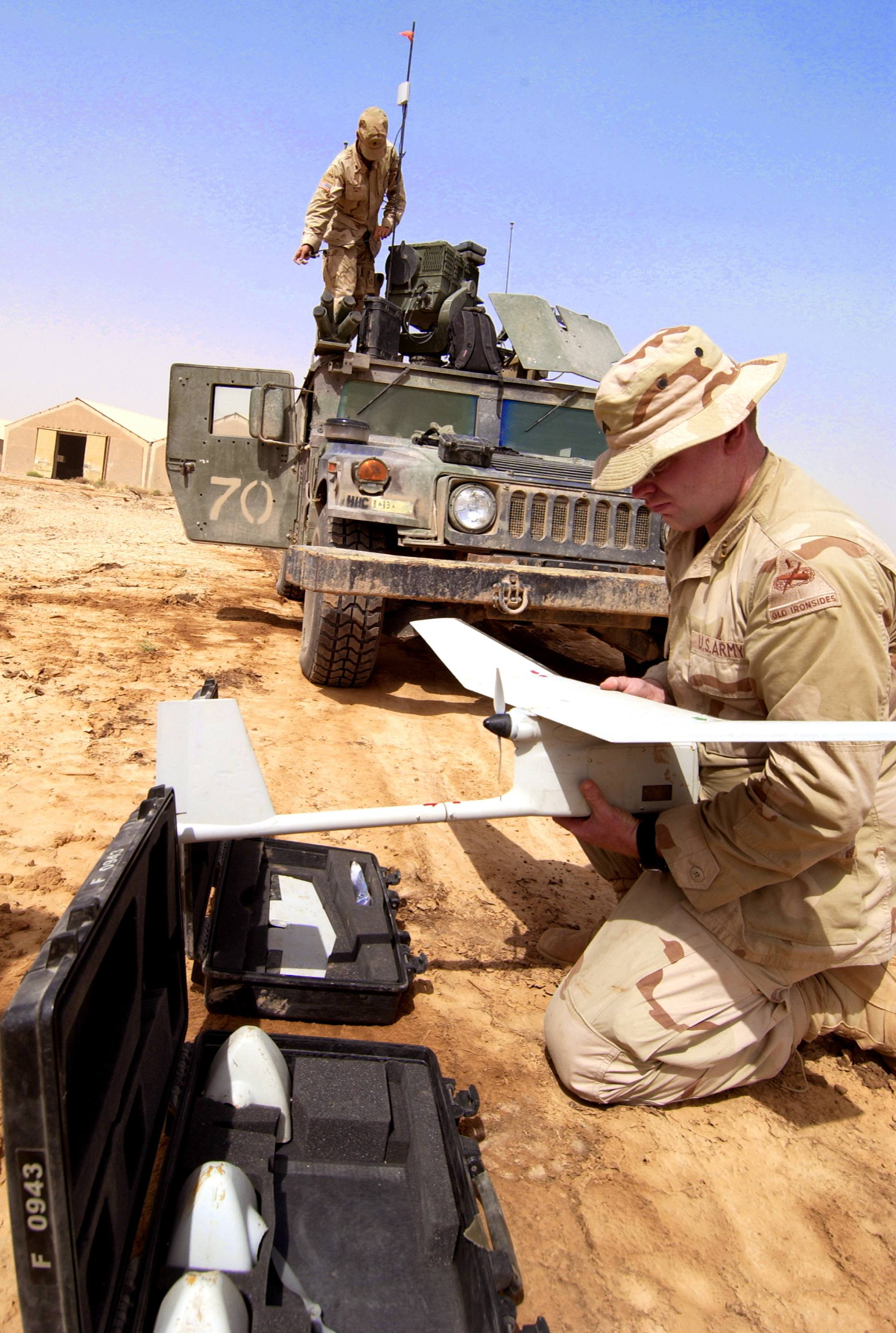
A soldier assembles a RQ-11 Raven in preparation for launch

In 1999, the US Army bought four AeroVironment Pointer small UAVs for testing in the service's "Military Operations In Urban Terrain" and was enthusiastic about the usefulness of the Pointer. It is too large to be conveniently carried by soldiers and is normally hauled around in a HMMWV(Humvee) vehicle or the like, and so the Army asked AeroVironment to develop a smaller version. AeroVironment developed a half-sized control system and a cut-down version of the Pointer called the RQ-11 Raven (no relationship to the Flight Refueling Raven).

The Raven has an endurance of 90 minutes on rechargeable batteries. It can be carried by a single soldier along with other standard battle gear. Following the Afghanistan campaign in 2001–2002, the US SOCOM ordered 80 Ravens, which was more than the total number of Pointers that had been sold to that time. The US Army also placed orders for up to 105 Ravens in the late summer of 2003 after the US occupation of Iraq led to persistent insurgent attacks on US forces. Since then, the RQ-11B Raven B has become the official standard SUAS (Small Unmanned Aircraft System) for USSOCOM, US Army, US Marines, and several countries. As of early 2008, over 8000 Raven airframes have been shipped to customers worldwide. Ravens have been operational in combat in Afghanistan, Iraq, and other undisclosed locations.

Encouraged by such successes, AeroVironment is also working on a newer version of the Pointer, named the "Puma", with greater endurance and payload. In addition, they have disclosed that they are in late development of a small lethal UAV.

=== Baykar Bayraktar Mini UAV ===
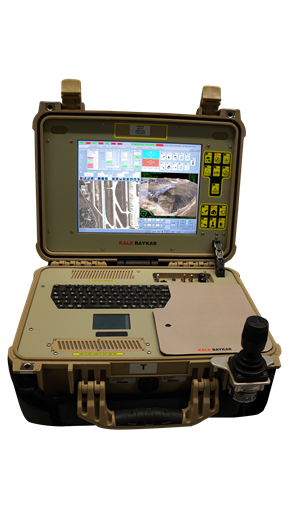
Portable flight terminal of Baykar Bayraktar Mini UAV

Bayraktar Bayraktar Mini UAV is a hand-launched, portable UAV system, designed to operate under harsh geographic and meteorological conditions.

=== Interspect UAS B 3.1 "Flying Lab" ===
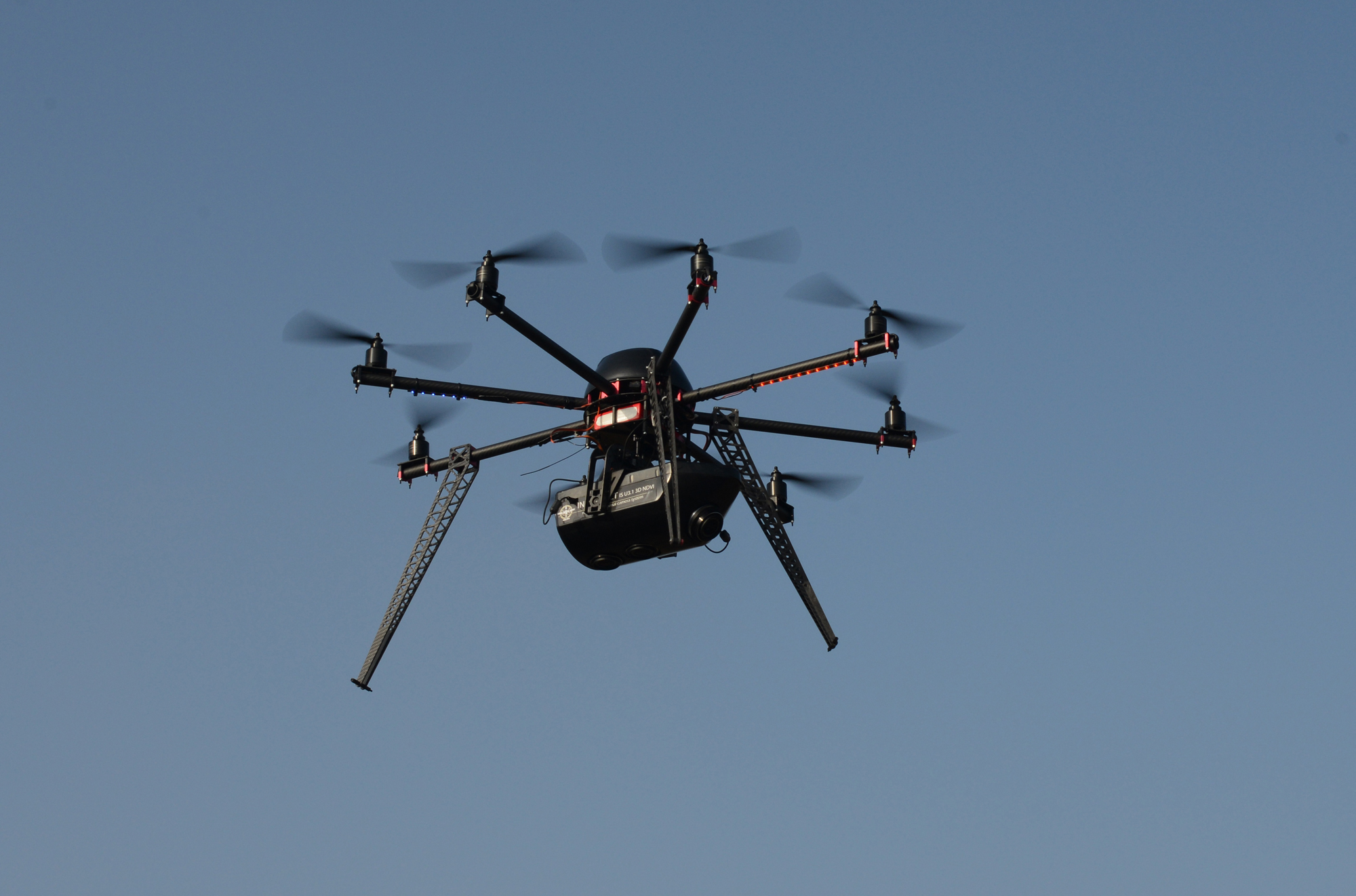
Interspect UAS B 3.1 Flying Laboratory

The Interspect UAS B 3.1 is a remote sensing platform for 3D photogrammetric purposes. The Interspect UAS B 1.1 octocopter first flew on 10 April 2011. The prototype had one DSLR camera and limited capability. The third variant able to fly 12 min with 3 kg loading. Interspect UAS B 3.1 have a removable 3D photogrammetry camera with humidity meter and other instruments. The octocopter's diameter is 1165 mm.

=== Aeryon Labs "Scout" ===
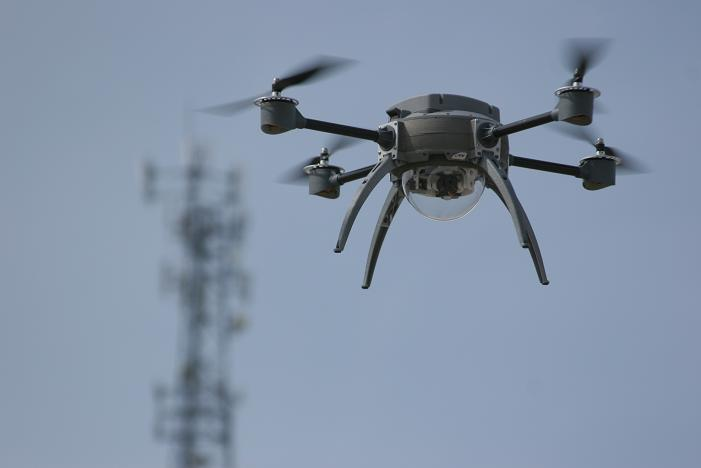
Aeryon Scout micro VTOL UAV

The Aeryon Scout is a man-packable quadcopter UAV designed for aerial reconnaissance by users with minimal training. Weighing just 1.3 kg, it features onboard intelligence, all-digital communications and a map-based touch-screen control which enables new users to operate the vehicles with only minutes of training. This map-based control allows the system to be easily controlled beyond line-of-sight and at night, a unique feature of this system. Its unique modular design allows for quick-connect payloads of different types and its arms and legs are changeable in the field, with no tools. This allows the user to repair damages easily and return to operation quickly. The Scout is approximately 0.8 m from propeller tip to tip and operates using four brushless DC motors, making it very quiet. It has an endurance of approximately 20 minutes. It is capable of flying in winds up to 50 km/h and designed for all-weather operation, with an industrial temperature range. It has a payload capability of approximately 250 grams. It has been designed for both military and civilian use, with specific focus to remain dual-use compliant.

=== Aeryon Labs "SkyRanger" ===
The Aeryon SkyRanger builds on the capabilities of the Aeryon Scout and is a man-packable quadcopter UAV designed for aerial reconnaissance by users with minimal training. About 1 kg heavier than the Aeryon Scout at 2.5 kg, the Aeryon SkyRanger shares the map-based control interface. The SkyRanger is capable of longer duration flight, and can fly up to 50 minutes with a dual EO/IR payload. The SkyRanger has a higher bitrate, IP-based network and is capable of streaming HD video from over 5 km, with multicasting capabilities. The vehicle is all-weather capable, with an industrial temperature range and has a top speed of 65 km/h. It is able to withstand windgusts up to 90 km/h. The Aeryon SkyRanger has a folding design that makes it quickly deployable.

=== Applied Aeronautics "Albatross UAV" ===
The Albatross looks a bit like the military RQ-7 Shadow drone but can be purchased for less than US$2,000. Several options are available. In 2018, the Albatross UAV was shown at the signing of a partnership between Boeing's Insitu and the Queensland Government. It has since been used extensively in Australia.

=== Aurora Flight Sciences Skate SUAS ===
The Skate SUAS is a man portable unmanned system designed for the tactical user (military, police etc.) but also useful for other applications where portability and operation from constrained environments are critical. It is a 2.2 lb (1 kg) airframe coupled with a custom portable GCS. It has user swappable payloads and can be equipped with a variety of EO, IR and/or thermal imagers. Flight endurance is around 1hr.

The Skate SUAS was put into service with Army and Air Force units in Afghanistan in March 2013.

=== China "CATIC" ===
CATIC of China has developed their own hand-launched man-portable UAV, the "ASN-15", with an endurance of an hour and a payload of 6.5 kilograms (14 pounds). It has a maximum speed of 80~90km/h and can fly at altitudes ranging from 50-500M. The UAV is fitted with a CCD camera and transmits the image data to the ground station via datalink in a real-time manner. The ASN-15 drone has been deployed by the PLA ground forces for intelligence, surveillance and reconnaissance (ISR) roles.

=== EADS "Tracker" ===
European EADS organization is developing a small UAV named the Tracker, which features a wide-span wing, twin booms for payload and so on, and a central pod with tractor and puller propellers. It has a weight of 7.5 kilograms (17 pounds), a span of 1.4 meters (4 feet 7 inches), and an endurance of an hour.

=== Elbit "Skylark I" and "Seagull" ===
In the spring of 2003 Elbit of Israel introduced two electrically powered man-portable UAVs, the Skylark and the Seagull. Both of these UAVs have a launch weight of about 5.5 kilograms (12 pounds), a speed of from 35 to 70 km/h (20 to 40 knots), and can carry either a color daylight imager or an infrared imager. The Skylark I is of conventional configuration, resembling nothing so much as a large kid's rubber-band airplane with a pod under the fuselage. It has an endurance of 1.5 hours.

The Seagull is much less conventional, in the form of a boomerang-shaped flying wing with wingtip fins and a pusher propeller. Size, performance, and payload details of the Seagull are similar to those of the Skylark, but the endurance is stretched to six hours.

=== EMT "Aladin" ===
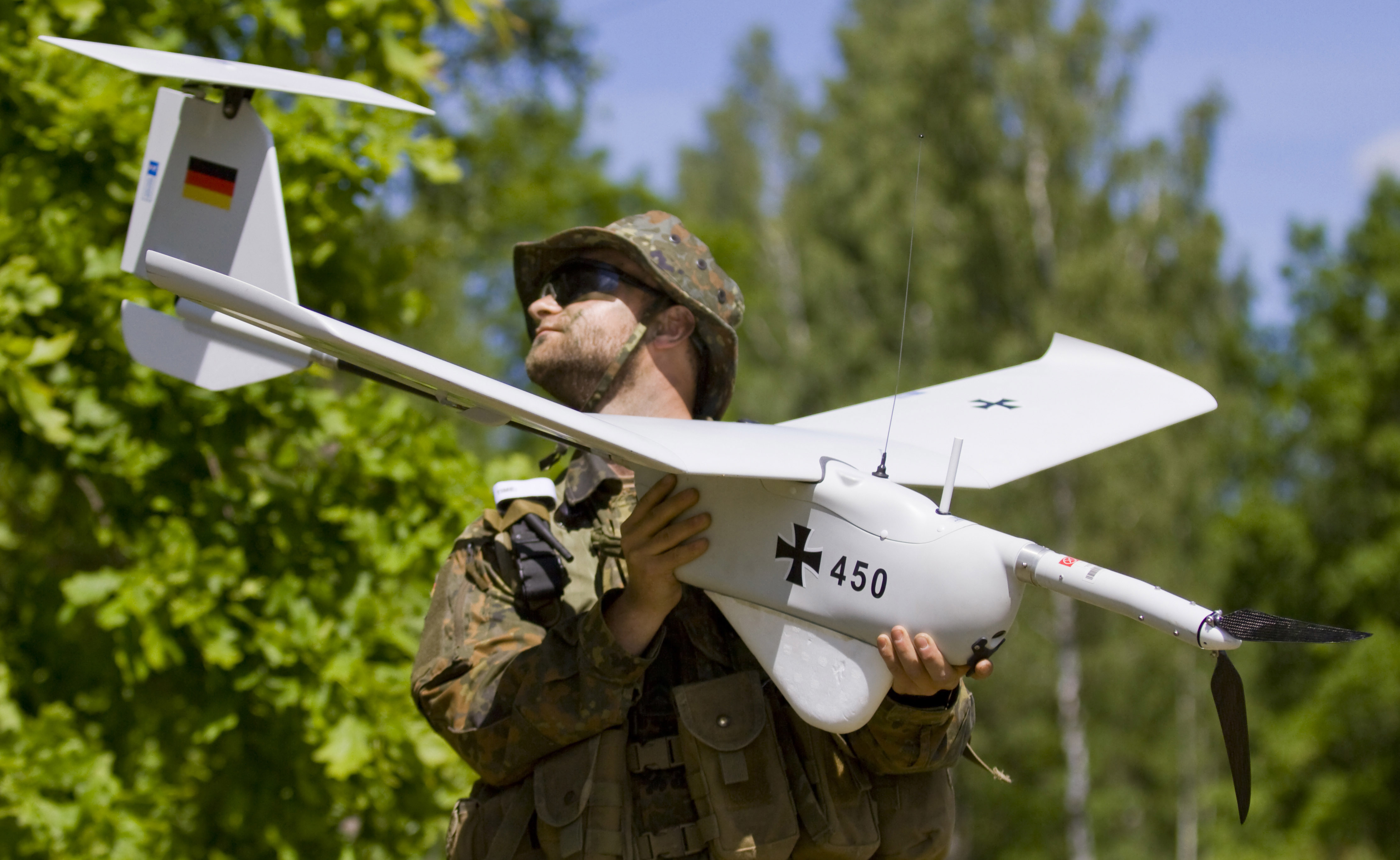
EMT Aladin

German manufacturer EMT has produced the Aladin Mini-UAV for German forces. It has a range of more than 15 km and an endurance of 30–60 minutes.

=== IAI Malat "BirdEye"s and "Mosquito" ===
IAI Malat has also introduced their own small UAV line, designated BirdEye, which includes the 5 kilograms (11 pounds) BirdEye 500 and the 500 grams (1.1 pounds) BirdEye 100. Sources also mention a Malat micro-UAV, the Mosquito, though this may be the same as the BirdEye 100. Malat has been promoting the BirdEye 500 for both military and civilian uses, with civilian uses including urban security, crime-fighting, and traffic observation.

=== Lockheed Martin "Desert Hawk" ===
US forces are also using another mini-UAV in Iraq, the Lockheed Martin Desert Hawk. It weighs 3.2 kilograms (7.1 pounds), has a wingspan of 1.32 meters (52 in) and a length of 86.4 centimeters (34.0 in). It is made mostly of plastic foam, suggesting something like a Nerf toy, and uses an electric motor driving a pusher propeller as a powerplant, making it very quiet. It is launched with a bungee cord, carries three small CCD cameras, has an endurance of about an hour. It flies mostly under autonomous control, with the "pilot" keeping track of what's going on with a laptop computer.

The Desert Hawk was designed by Lockheed Martin's Skunk Works for the Air Force FPASS (Force Protection Airborne Surveillance System) Program on a quick-reaction contract issued late in the winter of 2002, with the first system delivered in the early summer. It was designed quickly because it leveraged heavily off of technology and design studies developed for the MicroStar MAVs.

However, in 2007, the US Air Force FPASS office switched all of their UAV systems over to the RQ-11 Raven B. Desert Hawk did make the short-list for the recent Netherlands Army Mini-UAV program, but ultimately lost to the RQ-11B Raven B. The only military forces still using Desert Hawk are the UK Army.

=== Honeywell RQ-16 T-Hawk ===
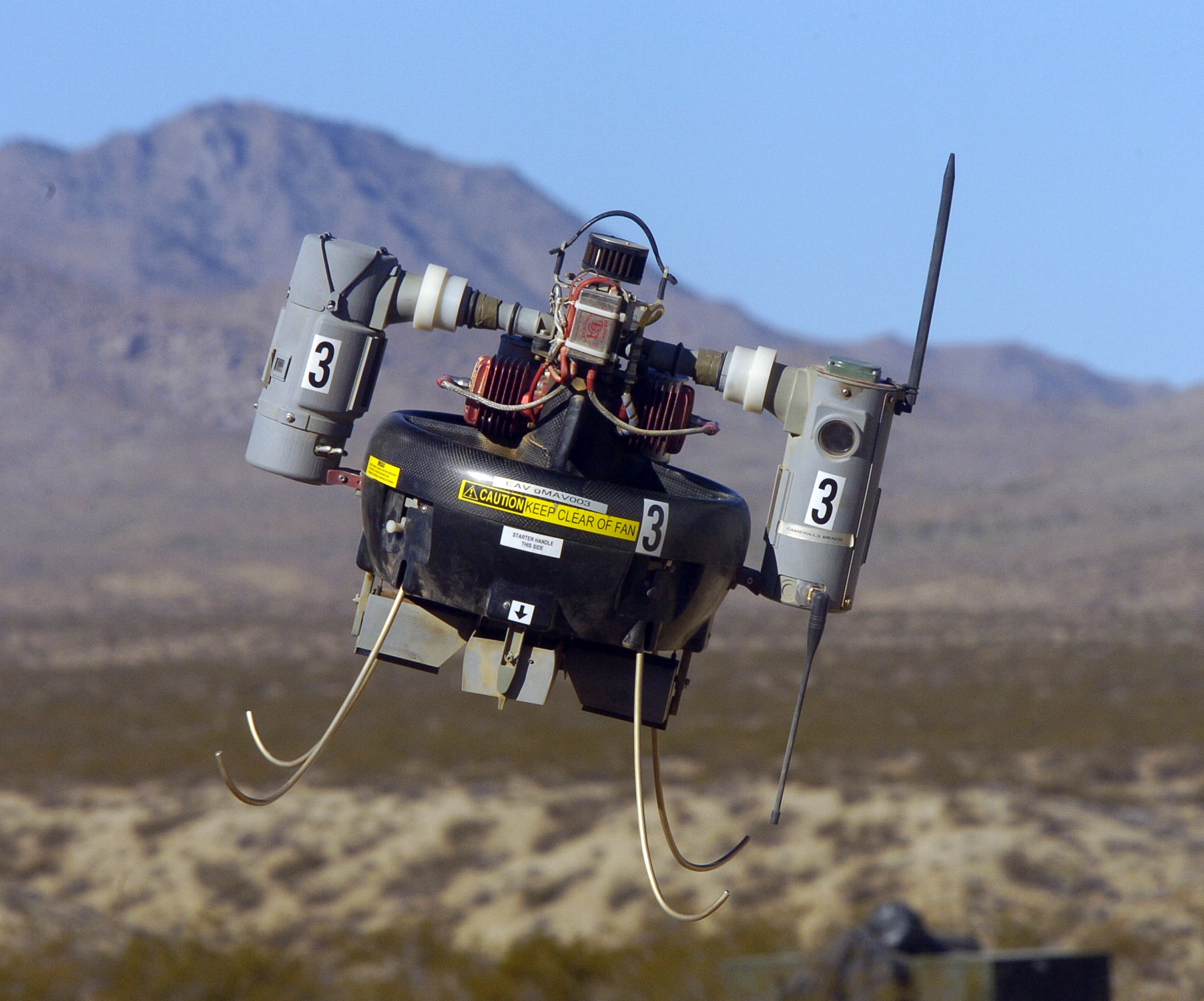
Honeywell RQ-16A T-Hawk.

The Honeywell RQ-16 T-Hawk (for "Tarantula hawk", a wasp species) is a ducted fan VTOL miniature UAV. Developed by Honeywell, it is suitable for backpack deployment and single-person operation.

=== MAVinci "SIRIUS UAS" ===
The SIRIUS UAS is a completely autonomous small airplane with a wingspan of two meters. The UAV combined with the image post processing software enables one to simply obtain aerial images and calculate orthofotos and three dimensional elevation models out of the image data. The flight planning is done automatically after selecting the aerial image area. The flightplan can be altered before and during the flight. No catapult or launching device is necessary because the UAV is hand-launched. During the flight aerial images are recorded automatically. Manual control during the flight in case of emergencies is possible with assisted flight mode supported by the autopilot. In this mode landing is also possible on very small areas. Autonomous landing is also available.

=== NRL "Dragon Eye", "Swallow" and "Finder" ===
The US Naval Research Laboratory (NRL) has developed a man-portable UAV of roughly the same size as the AeroVironment Raven, named the RQ-14 Dragon Eye (no relationship to the BAI Aerosystems Dragon). The Dragon Eye is a tailless design with a rectangular wing and twin props. It is designed to fit into a backpack, with a weight of 2.25 kilograms (5.0 pounds) and a span of 1.14 meters (3 feet 9 inches). It can be launched by hand or bungee slingshot and has a GPS-INS-based waypoint navigation system.

One of the features is that the operator monitors Dragon Eye operation through "video goggles" connected to a laptop computer. The control system weighs about 5.4 kilograms (12 pounds). The Dragon Eye's endurance is an hour. The production contract for Dragon Eye was awarded to AeroVironment in 2003, and over 1000 aircraft were built before the Marines switched over to the RQ-11B Raven B for the remainder of the Dragon Eye production contract.

The NRL has also built at least two other small UAVs. The Swallow is of more conventional configuration than the Dragon Eye, roughly comparable to the AeroVironment Pointer, with long sailplane wings and a tail-mounted propeller. Details are unclear, but it has been used in NRL experiments to develop anti-sniper sensors for base security applications.

The Finder (Flight Inserted Detector Expandable for Reconnaissance), with a weight of 26 kilograms (57 pounds), can carry a small imager, or an atmospheric sampling sensor to check for radiological / chemical / biological contaminants, and other sensor payloads are being considered. Other details of the Finder are unclear.

The Finder has been evaluated as a payload for the Predator UAV, with one Finder carried under each wing, acting as a parasite UAV like the Raytheon SilentEyes. Initial flight tests of the Finder with the Predator were performed in the summer of 2002.

=== Rafael "SkyLite" ===
Rafael of Israel has built a man-portable UAV also named the SkyLite, which is fired out of a tube like an antitank missile, and has an endurance of about an hour. It can be launched from a vehicle mount or shoulder-launched by a soldier. Skylite B is the newest version, and is rail-launched. In October 2008, Rafael announced that a SkyLite B had achieved an altitude of 70,000 feet (21,000 m).

The SkyLite has a certain general resemblance to the Raytheon SilentEyes, being a tube a 110 centimeters (3 feet 7 inches) long with a glass sensor nose; a pusher propeller powered by an electric motor; pop-out straight wings with a span of 150 centimeters (4 feet 11 inches); and a cruciform pop-out tail. It has a launch weight of 6 kilograms (13 pounds). It was originally named "Skylark" but Rafael decided to change the name to avoid confusion with the Elbit Skylark.

=== Russian UAV ZALA 421-08 and ZALA 421-12 ===
ZALA 421-08 developed by A-Level Aerosystems, Izhevsk, Russia is a flying wing UAV featuring a weight of 1.7 kg and a wing span of mere 0.8 m. The payload consists of color forward-looking and side-looking cameras. The plug-in cameras module can be easily replaced with the infrared camera. Its range is 15 km, maximum flight duration is 90 minutes. ZALA 421-08 is powered by an electric motor. The UAV is launched by hand and landed on a 30×100m ground using parachute. Small sizes make it indispensable in urban areas and busy air spaces. Being operated by all power ministries of Russia, ZALA 421-08 has proved itself as an extremely useful surveillance tool when capturing the terrorists and smugglers.

ZALA 421-12 is a flying wing UAV specially designed by A-Level Aerosystems, Izhevsk, Russia for Federal Security Service. It features a weight of approximately 4 kg and a wingspan of 1.6 m. The UAV carries EO equipment weighing up to 1 kg which may include gyro-stabilized down-looking video camera, 10 Mega Pixel photo camera or infrared camera. The UAV is powered by electric motor driving a small propeller in the nose, with rechargeable batteries permitting an hour of continuous flight at the range of 40 km. Its takeoff and landing is performed in fully automatic mode. The range of application is rather wide, including monitoring of emergencies and natural disasters, remote monitoring of fuel and energy complex, patrolling of land and sea borders, industrial and environmental monitoring, and protection of security-critical facilities.

=== ShadowView "Shadow Ranger" and "Eco Ranger" ===
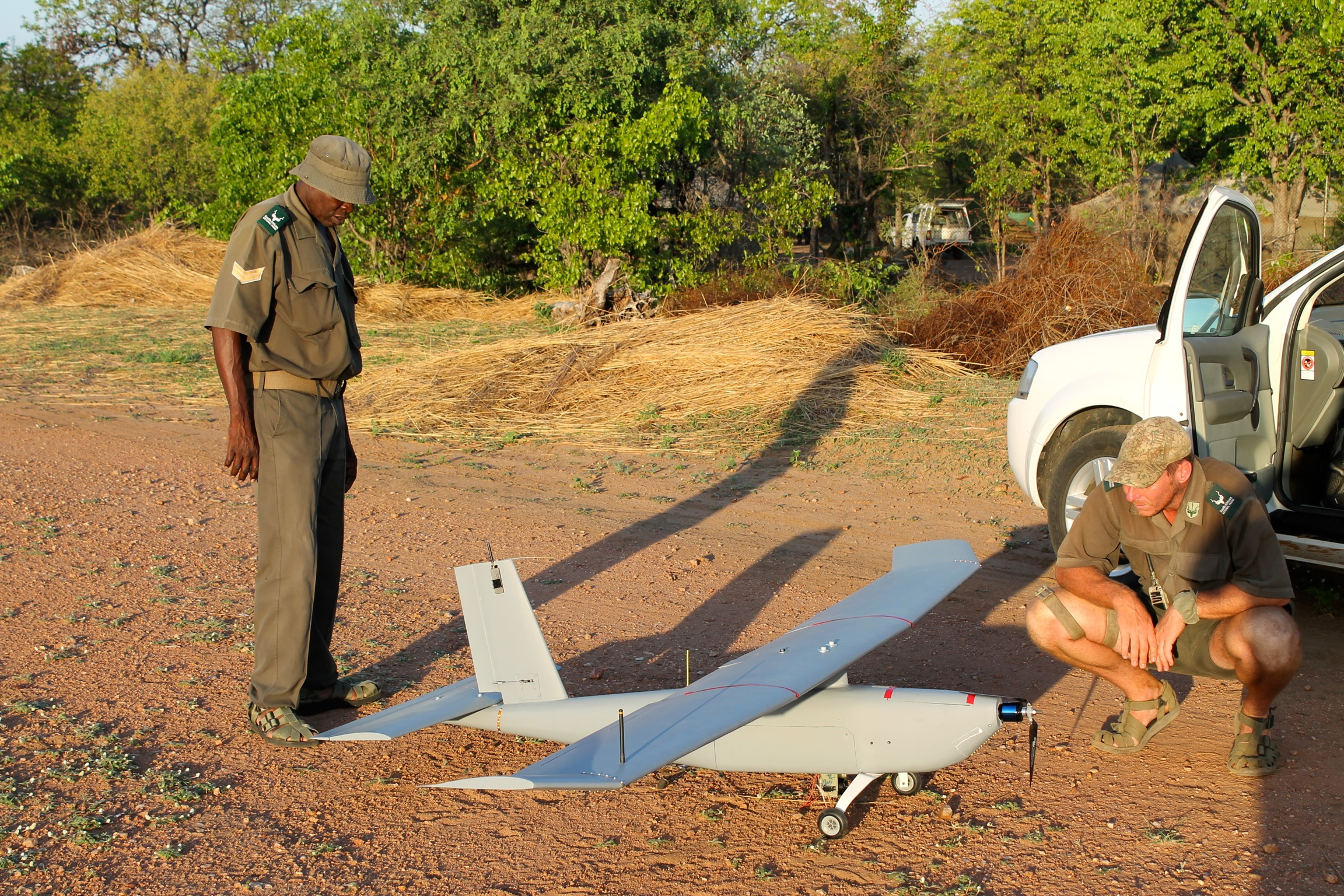
ShadowView Eco Ranger

ShadowView a United Kingdom UAS services provider founded in 2012, has designed and built an all new range of man-portable UAVs which are called Shadow Ranger and Eco Ranger. These small UAV can hand or rail launch depending upon payload weight. Systems have fully autonomous flight with automatic take off and landing option. Both the Shadow Ranger and slightly larger Eco Ranger have electric motors, gyro stabilized daytime and thermal video cameras (with retractable gimbal option), kevlar and composite structures and 60–120 minutes endurance (longer endurance is available for Eco Ranger with optional gas powered engines). In 2014 The Ranger systems will be deployed in South Africa, Malawi, Namibia, Australia, Thailand, India and Europe on a variety of humanitarian, anti poaching, precision agriculture and security operations.

=== Turkish "Malazgirt Mini UAV" ===
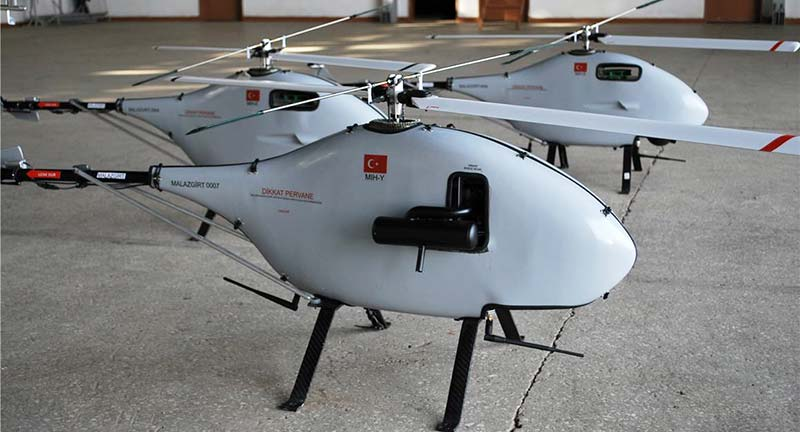
Malazgirt UAV

The Malazgirt Mini UAV is a Miniature UAV produced by Turkish company Baykar.

=== UAVER "Avian UAS" ===
Avian UAS is a complete unmanned aircraft system customized for various kind of missions depending on the installed payloads, such as real time surveillance, reconnaissance, aerial mapping, aerial photography and et cetera. Avian UAV has a wingspan of 1.6m and MTOW of 3.45 kg. Avian UAS has been very successful in monitoring the disaster in Taiwan and Thailand. Avian UAS is very user friendly and is designed to allow operator to operate with minimal training. It can be operated in complete autonomous mode, or simply using the gamepad to control the heading of the Avian UAV.

=== YellowPlane "Voyager" and "Manta" ===
High wing electric powered, 1.4m wingspan the Voyager is a conventional pusher airframe with a maximum AUW of 3.5 kg with a wide CG range useful for different payload configurations. The Manta, 1.2m wingspan flying wing is used for vertical NVIR imaging.

=== Trigger Composites Pteryx UAV ===
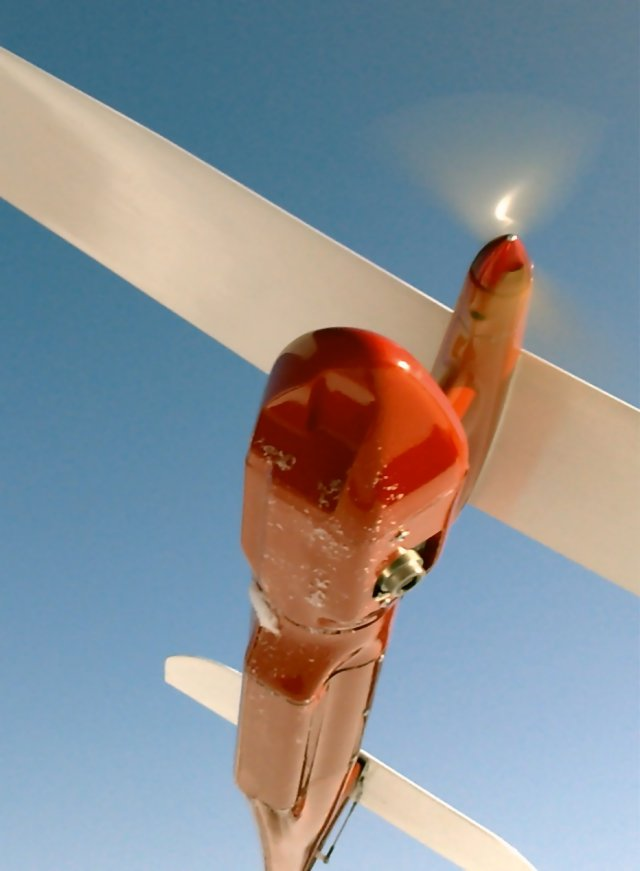
Pteryx UAV for civilian photomapping

In 2010, the company introduced a novel UAV that can fly diverse pre-programmed missions using only the simplest mission selector and a single takeoff button. The UAV features automatic takeoff and parachute landing, allowing reduction of workload and reducing configuration mistakes, identified as a major hazard in day-to-day civilian photomapping operations. No groundstation nor laptop is required as missions are defined relative to takeoff position. Despite featuring parachute, a sturdy fuselage, under 5 kg TOW and up to 1 kg payload, the UAV can fly one-hour missions (two hours with reduced payload).

== Gun-launched and parasite UAVs ==
=== MIT "WASP" ===
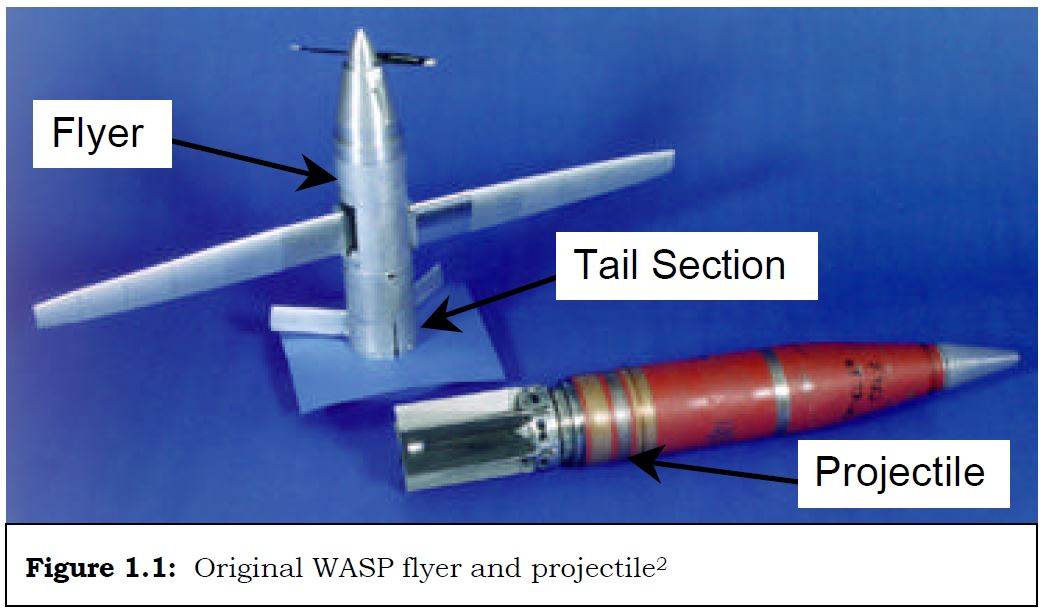
Original WASP flyer and projectile

The US Army has been interested in developing MAVs that could be deployed as munitions, fired from artillery or unguided rocket launcher pods. A research team at the Massachusetts Institute of Technology (MIT) has developed a prototype artillery-launched UAV. The UAV, named the Wide Area Surveillance Projectile (WASP), no relation to the AeroVironment Wasp, is fired out of a 127 millimeters (5.0 in) naval gun.

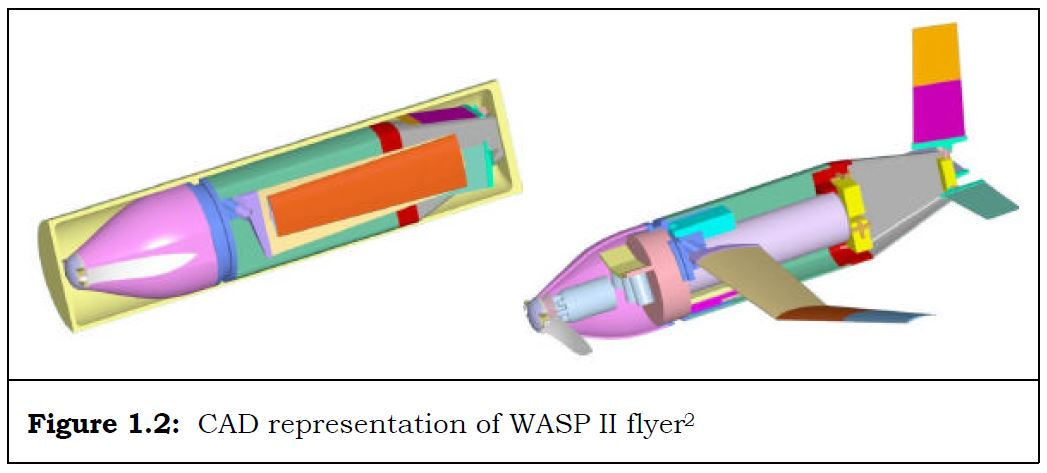
CAD representation of the WASP II Flyer

The MIT group modified a standard illumination flare round to serve as the external case. After firing, the shell popped out six fins to keep it from tumbling. Once the shell was 20 kilometers (12 mi) downrange, a parachute popped out of the tail to extract the drone. The parachute slowed the drone, which then unfolded into flight configuration. The WASP had a folding vee tail, a folding two-blade propeller up front, and two straight folding wings. The wings were folded into six sections and unfolded into a total span of 94.5 centimeters (3.10 feet). Once unfolded, the right wing was higher on the fuselage than the left, a result of the packaging scheme.

The WASP drone had a flight endurance of fifteen minutes, including ten minutes of powered flight and five minutes of glide. It had a tiny camera in its lower fuselage, and relayed both imagery and its own current GPS coordinates back to the warship or artillery battery that fired it. At least two WASP prototypes were built and tested. After initial announcements of the effort, the whole thing went quiet, but it remains a possibility.

=== "Wing-store UAV" and Raytheon "SilentEyes" ===
The Army had also worked on a UAV that could be launched out of a 70 millimeters (2.8 in) unguided rocket pod mounted on a helicopter and could also be carried by larger UAVs. This wing-store UAV was 1.8 meters (5.9 feet) long, and was fired out of the launch tube with a solid-rocket booster. It then deployed wings, tail, and propeller, and cruised for up to two hours on electric power at a speed of 185 km/h (100 knots). It could carry a small daylight or infrared camera.

Details of the wing-store UAV are unclear, but it may have had some resemblance to the Raytheon SilentEyes UAV. SilentEyes looked like a simple metal cylinder with a rounded cap, straight folding wings mounted in the middle of the UAV and with a noticeable dihedral, and a folding inverted-vee tail. The UAV was 46 centimeters (18 in) long and less than 7 centimeters (2.8 in) in diameter.

Raytheon called SilentEyes a "parasite" UAV, as it would be dispensed from a larger UAV such as a Predator; a gliding submunitions dispenser; or a cruise missile. The baseline version of the SilentEyes would be strictly a glider, but its glide ratio of 11:1 would allow it to stay in the air for a half-hour if released from typical Predator operational altitudes. It would be used for close-up examination of targets spotted by SAR to ensure that they are valid targets, or for post-strike target damage assessment.

The little UAV could carry a gimbaled infrared or color TV camera, with the video compressed for transmission by a UHF communications link over line-of-sight ranges. It could also carry a jammer payload, or a small warhead. Since multiple SilentEyes would be deployed at the same time, each could be assigned a different code or "telephone number" to minimize confusion in communications.

Raytheon was aiming for a target price of about US$5,000 to $10,000. The company was considering a powered version of SilentEyes with a microjet engine, as well as "stretched" versions of the UAV. The SilentEyes has been cancelled.

=== Italian "MALP" ===
Galileo Avionica of Italy is currently working on their own "parasite" UAV, called simply the Miniature Air Launched Payload (MALP), to be carried on a Falco or similar UAV. The MALP has large cruciform tailfins, small cruciform nosefins, and "switchblade" wings stowed back along the fuselage that pop out straight when the UAV is released. It is intended to carry imaging or other sensors to probe dangerous targets.

== Experimental and technology demonstrators ==
=== MAVs and mesicopters ===
The notion that small UAVs might have practical uses arose in the early 1990s. In 1992, DARPA conducted a workshop titled "Future Technology-Driven Revolutions In Military Operations". One of the topics in the workshop was "mobile microrobots". The idea of using very small "microdrones" was discussed, and after initial skepticism the idea started to gain momentum.

The RAND Corporation released a paper on the microdrone concept in 1994 that was widely circulated (Reference 12). DARPA conducted a series of "paper studies" and workshops on the concept in 1995 and 1996, leading to early engineering studies by the Lincoln Laboratories at the Massachusetts Institute of Technology (MIT), and the US Naval Research Laboratory (NRL) in Washington, D.C.c

The studies demonstrated that the concept was feasible. In 1997, DARPA then began a multi-year, US$35 million development program to develop "micro air vehicles (MAVs)". The MAV project's goals was to develop a microdrone whose largest dimension was no more than 15 centimeters (5.9 in); would carry a day-night imager; have an endurance of about two hours; and be very low cost. It would operate with a high degree of autonomy to be used in the squad-level combat environment. MAVs capable of hovering and vertical flight would be used to scout out buildings for urban combat and counter terrorist operations. A MAV could be included in a pilot's survival kit. A downed pilot could use it to keep track of enemy search parties, or as airborne radio relays to search and rescue units. MAVs are a class of man-portable miniature UAVs whose size enables them to be used in low altitude, close-in support operations.

=== Phase-two MAVs ===
This phase-one DARPA study ended in 2001, and was followed by a phase-two study that focused on particular vendors with an intent to develop MAVs closer to operational specification. A number of different MAVs were developed as part of these DARPA efforts:

Lockheed Sanders "Microstar"
The Lockheed Sanders MicroSTAR series of prototypes. The battery-operated MicroSTAR designs resembled kid's toys. An initial design had a fat teardrop body with stubby cropped-delta wings running along most of the body, along with a single vertical tailplane and a pusher propeller. A later version had winglets instead of the single vertical tailplane, and a nose mounted propeller. The MicroSTAR featured a five-gram navigation system that could be given directions by the ground station, but could also automatically keep on a heading or orbit a target.

CIT, AeroVironment and UCLA "MicroBat" ornithopter
The MicroBat ornithopter from the California Institute of Technology (Caltech), working with AeroVironment and the University of California, Los Angeles. The ornithopter design concept followed experiments conducted in the mid-1990s by Charles Ellington, a zoologist at the University of Cambridge, and his colleagues, in which mechanical analogues of insect wings were tested in a wind tunnel. The group was only interested in studying the biomechanics of insects and was extremely surprised that somebody seemed interested in them. The Caltech / AeroVironment MicroBat ornithopter was test-flown for short distances under battery power. Researchers performing flight tests with the MicroBat said it tended to attract small birds when it ran low on power and fell to the ground. The birds clustered near the floundering ornithopter in what seemed to be a desire to help.

Other research groups also worked on ornithopters. A Georgia Tech Research Institute group built a rubber-band powered entomopter and also did research on a chemically powered Reciprocating Chemical Muscle propulsion system.

Lutronix Corporation "Kolibri" micro-helicopter
The Kolibri micro-helicopter built by Lutronix Corporation of Del Mar, California. The Kolibri (German for "Hummingbird") was larger than the other DARPA MAV prototypes, with a weight of about 300 grams. The Kolibri was built as a cylinder with rotors at one or both ends, using vanes moved through the rotor airflow by piezoelectric actuators for flight control. It was powered by electric motors or a tiny, highly efficient multi-fuel engine developed by a company named D-STAR.

Micro Craft "SLADF" ducted fan micro-helicopter
The Small Lift Augmented Ducted Fan (SLADF) ducted-fan micro-helicopter, built by Micro Craft of San Diego, California, and Ontario, Canada. The SLADF was a ducted fan helicopter with a diameter of about 15 centimeters (5.9 in) and a weight of 1.8 kilograms (4.0 pounds), with payload. The SLADF did not appear to use a contra-rotating rotor design, using a single rotor with aerodynamic deflection surfaces inside the duct to cancel torque. First flight test of the SLADF was in late 2000. The SLADF could be fitted with an optional wing to provide useful lift to increase loiter time, and also provided additional fuel storage.

AeroVironment "Black Widow" flying-wing
The AeroVironment Black Widow MAV. Developed by a team led by Matt Keenon, the Black Widow was powered by electric motor driving a small propeller in the nose, with a lithium battery permitting about 20 minutes of flight. It carried an off-the-shelf camera chip giving it a color video resolution of 510 by 492 pixels. While the first Black Widow prototype was a flat disk with a single vertical stabilizer and a propeller in the front, it was followed by an improved Black Widow that looked a little like a thin portable CD player with tapered edges and cut-off corners; a propeller in front; and three fins on the back. It did not have autonomous navigation capabilities, and was controlled essentially like a hobbyist's RC airplane.

=== Subsystems design ===
Along with the flight prototypes, the DARPA effort considered subsystems design. A useful operational MAV would need a lightweight, highly efficient engine with a power source with high energy density. Electric motors were becoming available that met the requirement, but power sources were more troublesome. Lithium batteries were marginal. New compact fuel cells were in development but weren't expected to be available for several years.

One particularly intriguing option for both propulsion and power was a button-sized silicon microturbine ("jet") engine developed by Al Epstein at MIT during the 1990s. Silicon was actually a good structural material at such scales, though increasing operating temperature would have dictated use of silicon carbide.

A production device was envisioned as a centrifugal-flow engine about two centimeters across burning natural gas, with a single turbine disk for compression and a single disk for exhaust rotation. The design wasn't a conventional turbojet, resembling more a tiny flat cylindrical box with an inlet hole on one side and an exhaust hole on the other. It was expected to have a thrust-to-weight ratio of about 100—incredible compared to any "macroscale" engine but a logical consequence of scaling the technology down in size—and run at about 1.2 million RPM, making bearings a tricky issue. Since it could "spool up" in about a millisecond, it was envisioned as operating in a pulsed mode to conserve fuel and also provide a throttling scheme. A functioning gas turbine was never successfully implemented at this scale after years of development.

Other issues were control systems, since an MAV couldn't be flown like a model airplane and would have to be able to tolerate turbulence and wind gusts, and miniaturizing navigation, communications, and sensor systems, as well as ensuring that they didn't interfere with each other. DARPA specified that the payload would be no more than 15 grams.

=== Stanford "Mesicopter" ===
As extreme as MAV specifications were, a team under Ilan Kroo at Stanford University worked on an even more extreme design in the form of a centimeter-wide four-rotor mesicopter using microcircuit fabrication techniques. The work was funded by NASA. Design of such a small aircraft was constrained by the fact that at such scales, the air becomes a highly viscous medium, or in aerodynamic terms a mesicopter had a low Reynolds number. Basic aerodynamics of the mesicopter were defined by a cycle of computer simulation, followed by tests of model components. The research led to mesicopter rotor designs where the rotor looked much more like the blades of an ordinary room fan than the rotor of a conventional helicopter. Propeller designs did not achieve desired efficiency and the Mesicopter was never able to lift the weight of its own energy source.

=== MAVs rethought ===
The DARPA MAV effort ended in 2000 and the results of the effort were somewhat negative, demonstrating that a 15 centimeter UAV was simply too small to be useful or even workable, at least over the short run. However, though the size was unrealistic, the basic concept seemed valid even if a larger machine were needed.

DARPA did begin a follow-on effort in the spring of 2002, working with the US Army on a larger ducted fan vehicle as a follow-on to SLADF under the "Organic Air Vehicle (OAV)" program. Allied Aerospace, which had bought out Micro Craft, demonstrated a scaled-up SLADF, while Honeywell performed tests with their own ducted-fan vehicle, named iSTAR. However, neither vehicle seemed particularly promising and the program was cut short.

It was revived as OAV-2 in 2004, with DARPA specifying a diesel-powered ducted-fan vertical-takeoff UAV with a weight of 51 kilograms (112 pounds), including a payload of 10 kilograms; a range of 10 kilometers (6.2 mi); a top speed of 92 km/h (50 knots); the ability to hover in a 37 km/h (20 knots) wind; an endurance of two hours; and a ceiling of 3,350 meters (10,990 feet).

The OAV was to be carried, launched, and recovered on a Humvee, using a crew of two soldiers, who would be able to get it flying in five minutes. Its sensor systems will be able to provide targeting data to within 10 meters (33 feet) to support non-line-of-sight weapons. The UAV would have autonomous flight capabilities with the ability to maneuver in cluttered terrain using an all-weather obstacle-avoidance system, and DARPA wanted it to have the ability to land and conduct observations from its landing site. Other possibilities were use of the UAV for communications relay, SIGINT, countermeasures, or even armed attack. The Army was interested in the program, but its current status is uncertain. It may have disappeared again; and if so it may reappear once more.

=== Black Widow "Wasp" and "Hornet" ===
AeroVironment has also worked on follow-ons to its Black Widow, named the Wasp and the Hornet. The Wasp is a flying wing, with the wing in the form of a rectangle with a slightly swept leading edge. It is propeller driven, with the propeller in front. The Wasp's main improvement over the Black Widow is that the lithium-ion battery and wing structures are one and the same, allowing maximum battery capacity relative to MAV size. The Wasp has a wingspan of 33 centimeters (13 in) and a weight of 210 grams (7.4 ounces). Like the Black Widow, the Wasp is radio controlled.

In the spring of 2003, AeroVironment performed the first flight of the Hornet, which is similar to the Wasp but has a straight rectangular wing with a slightly greater span of 38 centimeters (15 in) and, more significantly, is powered by fuel cells. The fuel cells are built into the top of the wing, where they combine oxygen in the ambient air with hydrogen produced internally by the MAV through reaction of a hydride material with water.

The fuel cell system is expected to provide three times the endurance of batteries of comparable weight, though early flights were limited by the tendency of the fuel cells to dry out. DARPA is actually more interested in the battery-powered Wasp, but other interested parties in the US defense establishment, particularly the NRL, are very intrigued by fuel cells, and so DARPA is hedging its bets. Ultimately, AeroVironment engineers want to fit their MAVs with an autopilot and a color video camera.

=== French "Mirador" ===
The French have done work along similar lines, with the French defence procurement agency (DGA in its French acronym) sponsoring a flight demonstrator, the Mirador. It was a fixed-wing, propeller-driven aircraft 25 centimeters (9.8 in) long and was powered by miniature fuel cells that gave it an endurance of about 20 minutes. It was built by the French defense aerospace research agency ONERA, working with the Royal Military Academy of Brussels, and is primarily intended to be a testbed for miniature sensor technologies.

The DGA envisions an operational MAV as about 40 centimeters (16 in) long, with a weight of less than 1.5 kilograms (3.3 pounds), an endurance of 15 minutes or more, a ceiling of 100 meters (330 feet) and an operating radius of a kilometer (0.6 mile). For the moment, the concept seems strictly experimental.

=== Future smaller MAVs ===
The notion of bird-sized or even insect-sized MAVs has not disappeared, but is seen as a project for a future generation. MAVs have attracted a hobbyist and amateur community, and yearly competitive events have been conducted. These home-built MAVs necessarily show ingenuity rather than sophistication, but offer hope for an idea that will catch on.

Research in 2005 included a model utilizing ground effect at NPS, DelFly at TUDelft and Wageningen University, etc. Some also consider using a Reciprocating Chemical Muscle for actuating flapping wing MAVs such as the Entomopter pioneered by Robert C. Michelson of Georgia Tech's nonprofit Research Institute.

== See also ==
- Bird flight
- Insect flight
- Micro air vehicle
- Quadcopter
- RoboBee
- Unmanned aerial vehicle
