= Pteryx UAV =

Robotic airplane

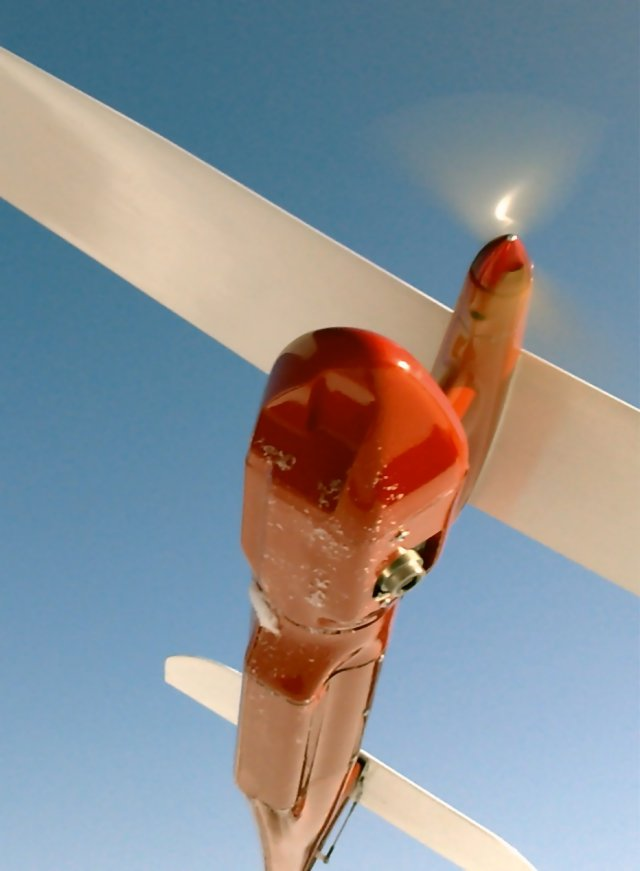
- Pteryx UAV, with the camera mounted sideways.

General information
- Type: UAV
- Role: Photography
- National origin: Poland
- Manufacturer: Trigger Composites

Pteryx UAV was a Polish Miniature Unmanned Aerial Vehicle (UAV) designed for civilian use. It was manufactured and sold by Trigger Composites. The machine was both a flying remote control (RC) model and pre-programmed vehicle. It was awarded the Innowator Podkarpacia medal for innovative design in the category of micro-enterprises of the Podkarpacie region in 2010.

== Origin ==
The Pteryx UAV uses a custom derivation of the FLEXIPILOT software, designed by Aerial Robotics engineering group for photomapping purposes and civilian use.

The avionics and flying platform are capable of full operational capability without using an active transmitter or ground station.

== Capabilities ==
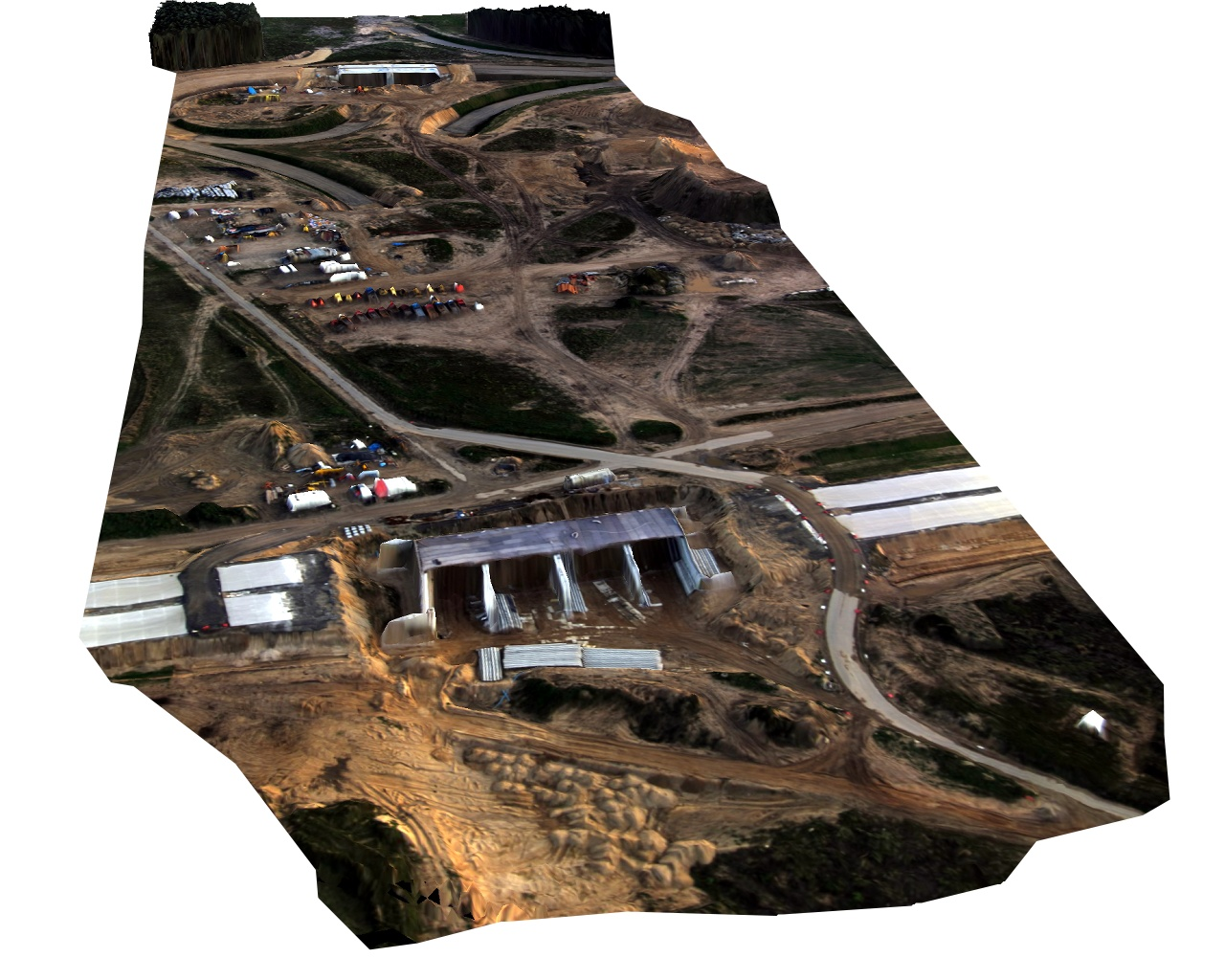
Digital Surface Model of a motorway interchange construction site.

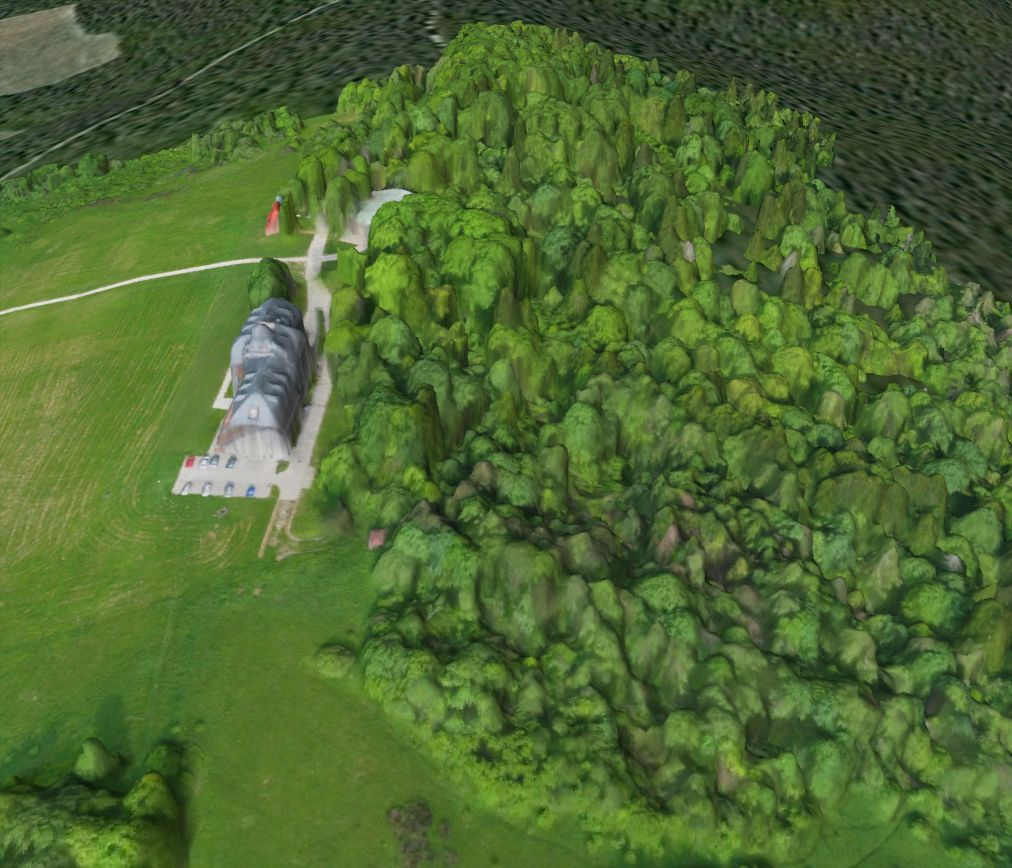
Bezmiechowa airfield 3D Digital Surface Model

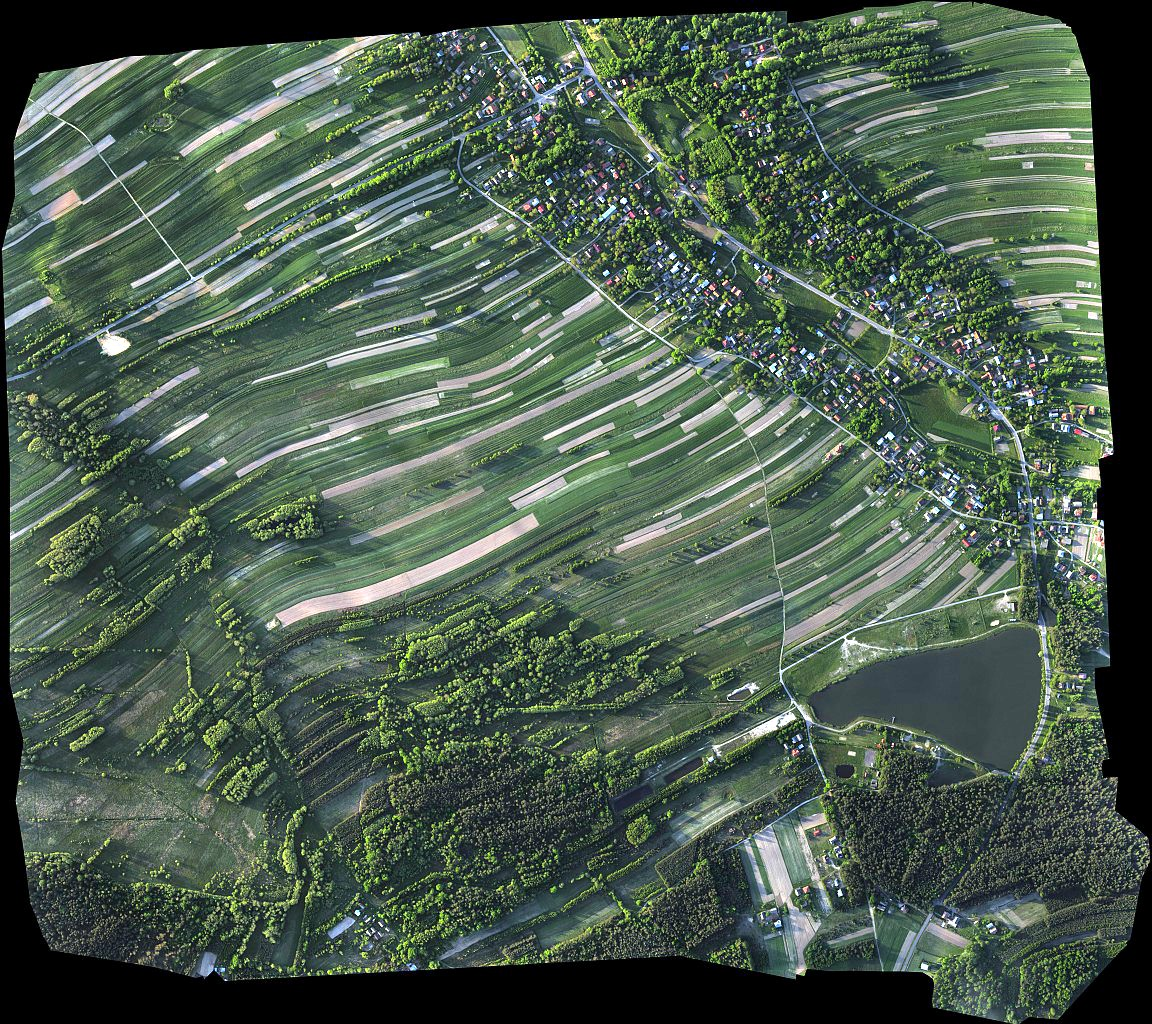
4.5km^{2} orthophotomap extracted from data collected during 1h flight

- Delivering data for generating digital elevation models using external photogrammetric software and orthorectification procedure
- Delivering data for precision agriculture by creating surface maps using mosaicking software
- Construction site and long-range linear mapping (up to around 40 km both ways with 2-hour flight time, reserve included)
- Carrying custom research equipment

The camera mount contains either pre-installed compact digital camera or can be exchanged for other equipment.

The camera can be mounted down-looking (nadir photography) or side-looking (oblique photography).

The whole head can be tilted in flight using the RC transmitter, while reducing stabilization travel to one of the sides.

== Capabilities ==
- Flying multiple missions per day without being required to reprogram the autopilot, using waypoints.
- Exchangeable mission package
- Single button operation
- Fully enclosed camera head
- Ability to accommodate a weight range 200g-1000g
- Takeoff by catapult
- Landing through use of a parachute

== Camera ==
The aircraft provides positions of the photos taken, and has storage for 8000 events. Ground-projected positions include the following error margins:

- GPS position error up to 5m.
- Altitude drift (up to 5m per 1 hour of flight)
- Camera head stabilization precision (transients up to 5°)
- Fuselage pitch due to turbulence (up to 8° during hot weather, typically 2° in winter)
- Camera mounting error (typically 1–4° if not calibrated)
- Heading/yaw error (the aircraft performs crabbing in presence of wind)

Typical orthophoto map precision (mean reprojection errors):

- 10 centimetres (3.9 in) horizontal
- 30 centimetres (12 in) vertical
- around 2.5m global shift to be removed with a few locally measured points

== Data processing strategies ==
Several data processing approaches are possible depending on application:

- Direct photo examination
- Non-georeferenced image stitching using free software
- Using free 3D modelling services, as mentioned in examples section
- Importing each photo as ground overlay in Google Earth (semi-automatic with supplied software)
- Using pre-paid service based on cloud computing, yielding a result in hours (delivers orthophotomap and optionally DSM)
- Local processing using specialized GIS software created specifically for large scale image mosaicking (delivers orthophotomap and optionally DSM)

== Aircraft components ==
- Fuselage
- 3-section wings with mounting screws
- Horizontal stabilizer section
- Parachute

== Other required equipment ==
- LiPo batteries
- Laptop or netbook
- Compact digital camera
- RC controller compliant with local laws (see Radio-controlled aircraft Transmitting and Receiving Frequencies)

== General characteristics ==
Masses:

- Maximum takeoff weight 5.0 kg

Dimensions:

- Wingspan: 2.8 m
- Length: 1.4 m
- Height: 0.33 m
- Propulsion: brushless DC electric motor and rechargeable lithium polymer battery
- Endurance: 55min with 1 kg payload, 120min with 450g payload

V speeds:

- V_{C}: around 50 km/h
- V_{S}: 34–38 km/h depending on TOW
- V_{A}: 120 km/h
- V_{NE}: 160 km/h

Flight altitude:

- Service Ceiling 3000m Pteryx Lite
- Service Ceiling 1200m Pteryx Pro
- Cruise altitude 100–520m AGL, 250m typical – dictated by photo resolution

Handling:

- Assembly time: Around 5 minutes.
- Materials: Custom fiberglass composite material covered with durable red gelcoat, carbon fiber and Kevlar reinforcements, wood and other plastics. Wooden or all-composite wings are offered.
