= Systematic reconnaissance flight =

Wide-scale method for assessing wildlife populations

Systematic Reconnaissance Flight (SRF) is a scientific method in wildlife survey for assessing the distribution and abundance of wild animals. It is widely used in Africa, Australia and North America for assessment of plains and woodland wildlife and other species.

The method involves systematic or random flight lines (transects) over the target area at a constant height above ground, with at least one observer recording wildlife in a calibrated strip on at least one side of the aircraft.

The method has been criticised for low accuracy and precision, but is considered to be the best option for relatively inexpensive coverage of large game areas.
