= Reciprocating Chemical Muscle =

The reciprocating chemical muscle (RCM) is a mechanism that takes advantage of the superior energy density of chemical reactions. It is a regenerative device that converts chemical energy into motion through a direct noncombustive chemical reaction.

== Function ==
RCM is capable of generating autonomic wing beating from a chemical energy source. It can also be used to provide a small amount of electricity to the onboard control systems. It further helps in differential lift enhancement on the wings to achieve roll, pitch, and hence, steered flight. The RCM technique is particularly useful in the manufacturing of insect-like micro air vehicles. The first generation of RCMs was large and had a reciprocating frequency around 10 Hz. The later generations developed were very much smaller and lighter. Also, the reciprocating frequency of this generation RCM was as high as 60 Hz. The reciprocating chemical muscle was invented by Prof. Robert C. Michelson of the Georgia Tech Research Institute and implemented up through its fourth generation by Nino Amarena of ETS Laboratories.

== Benefits ==
Particular benefits of the RCM are:

- It requires no ignition source (thereby allowing it to work in explosive atmospheres).
- It is independent of external oxidant (thereby allowing it to operate under water or in oxygen-free environments such as the lower atmosphere of the planet Mars).
- It thermoelectrically generates electrical energy from its own exothermic metabolism.
- It converts chemical potential energy directly into kinetic energy with greater energy density than batteries.

== Mechanism ==
The reciprocating chemical muscle uses various monopropellants in the presence of specific catalysts to create gas from a liquid without combustion. This gas is used to drive reciprocating opposing cylinders (in the fourth-generation device) to produce sufficient motion (throw) with sufficient force and frequency to allow flapping-wing flight. As of 2004, the RCM had been demonstrated in the Georgia Tech Research Institute laboratory to achieve sufficient throw, force, and frequency for operation of a 50-gram entomopter while using high concentration (> 90%) hydrogen peroxide in the presence of a proprietary catalyst developed by ETS Laboratories.

== Specific uses ==
The reciprocating chemical muscle was developed as a drive mechanism for the flapping wings of the entomopter. The RCM reuses energy many times before releasing it into its surroundings. First, it converts mainly heat energy into flapping-wing motion in the entomopter. Then, heat is scavenged for thermoelectric generation in support of ancillary systems. Waste gas from the chemical decomposition of the fuel is then used to create a frequency modulated continuous wave acoustic ranging signal that is Doppler insensitive (used for obstacle avoidance). Waste gas is then passed through an ejector to entrain external atmospheric gases to increase mass flow and decrease waste gas temperature so that lower-temperature components can be used downstream. Some waste gas is diverted into gas bearings for rotational and linear moving components. Finally, remaining waste gas is vectored into the wings where it is used for circulation-controlled lift augmentation (Coanda effect). Any remaining gas can be used for vectored thrust, but if the gas budgets are correctly designed, there should be no extra gas beyond the circulation control points. The features of the RCM are tailored to the entomopter to conserve energy.

== Patents ==
1. U.S. Patent No. 6,446,909, September 10, 2002, “Reciprocating Chemical Muscle (RCM) and Method for Using Same”
