= Great Lakes Gliding Club =

Soaring club near Toronto, Canada

- Purpose: Gliding club
- Location: Tottenham/Ronan Aerodrome
- Website: http://www.greatlakesgliding.com

Great Lakes Gliding Club (GLGC) is a soaring club located at Tottenham/Ronan Aerodrome, 56.9 km northwest of Toronto, Ontario, Canada.

Approach to runway 08.

Great Lakes Gliding provided facilities and pilot training for construction and testing of the UTIAS Snowbird, the first human-powered ornithopter to sustain straight and level flight, now undergoing record certification by the Fédération Aéronautique Internationale (FAI).

GLGC operates on a not-for-profit basis, and flight instruction is provided for free by volunteer instructors.

In common with other Canadian gliding clubs, it is a member of the Soaring Association of Canada.
