= List of national gliding associations =

The sport of gliding is managed in each country by national gliding associations, subject to governmental aviation authorities to varying degrees. Internationally the sport is co-ordinated by the FAI Gliding Commission.

- Australia - Gliding Federation of Australia
- Canada - Soaring Association of Canada
- New Zealand - Gliding New Zealand
- South Africa - Soaring Society of South Africa
- Turkey - Turkish Aeronautical Association
- United Kingdom - British Gliding Association
- USA - Soaring Society of America
