= Burgundy Farm Country Day School =

Coordinates: 38°47′55.9″N 77°5′45.8″W

- 3700 Burgundy Road; Alexandria, VA 22303

Information
- School type: Independent; Progressive
- Established: 1946
- Head of School: Jeff Sindler
- Grades: JK-8
- Enrollment: 275
- Student to teacher ratio: 7:1
- Accreditation: VAIS
- Website: www.burgundyfarm.org

Burgundy Farm Country Day School is an independent school on a 25-acre (100,000 m^{2}) campus in the Rose Hill census-designated place of Fairfax County, Virginia, United States, with an Alexandria postal address, and 611 acres (2.47 km^{2}) in West Virginia. It serves students in grades Junior Kindergarten through Eighth Grade.

== History ==
The school was founded in 1946 by a group of concerned parents, which included some Quakers and also included noted CBS broadcast journalist Eric Sevareid and his wife Lois. In 1950, Burgundy became the first school in the Commonwealth of Virginia to racially integrate and worked actively to attract non-white students. Camay Calloway Murphy, daughter of Jazz bandleader and singer Cab Calloway, became one of the first African-Americans to teach at a white school when she accepted a position at Burgundy in the early 1950s.

== Campus ==
The school's main campus is located on a former dairy farm just outside the Washington, DC/Northern Virginia beltway. In 2018, the school renovated the commons and added an arts building known as The Loft.

== Center for Wildlife Studies ==
Burgundy's second campus, a 524-acre (212 ha) wildlife preserve in the Appalachian Mountains in West Virginia called the Burgundy Center for Wildlife Studies, is commonly referred to as "the Cove." All classes, beginning with first grade, visit the Cove for intensive study in science and natural history biannually.

The Cove recently acquired another 24 acres (9.7 ha), from landowners surrounding the property. The funding for the purchase of these extra 24 acres came from "The Big Hike", in which a Burgundy teacher, sometimes accompanied by students, hiked from his home in Alexandria to The Cove.

== Summer Camps ==
The two campuses both offer a summer camp with open enrollment. The main campus is a summer day camp for 3 years, 8 months to 12 years old. The Burgundy Center campus hosts primarily sleep-away nature-oriented summer camp programs for 8 to 15 year olds and adults.

== Notable alumni ==
- Alex Albrecht, television personality, actor and podcaster
- Robert C. Michelson '65, Principal Research Engineer Emeritus, Georgia Institute of Technology; Recipient of the 2001 Pirelli Award and the first €25,000 Top Pirelli Prize; progenitor of the field of aerial robotics
- Jim Sanborn '59, sculptor best known for creating the Kryptos sculpture at the CIA headquarters
- Samira Wiley '01, actress known for Orange is the New Black
