= Micro air vehicle =

Class of very small unmanned aerial vehicle

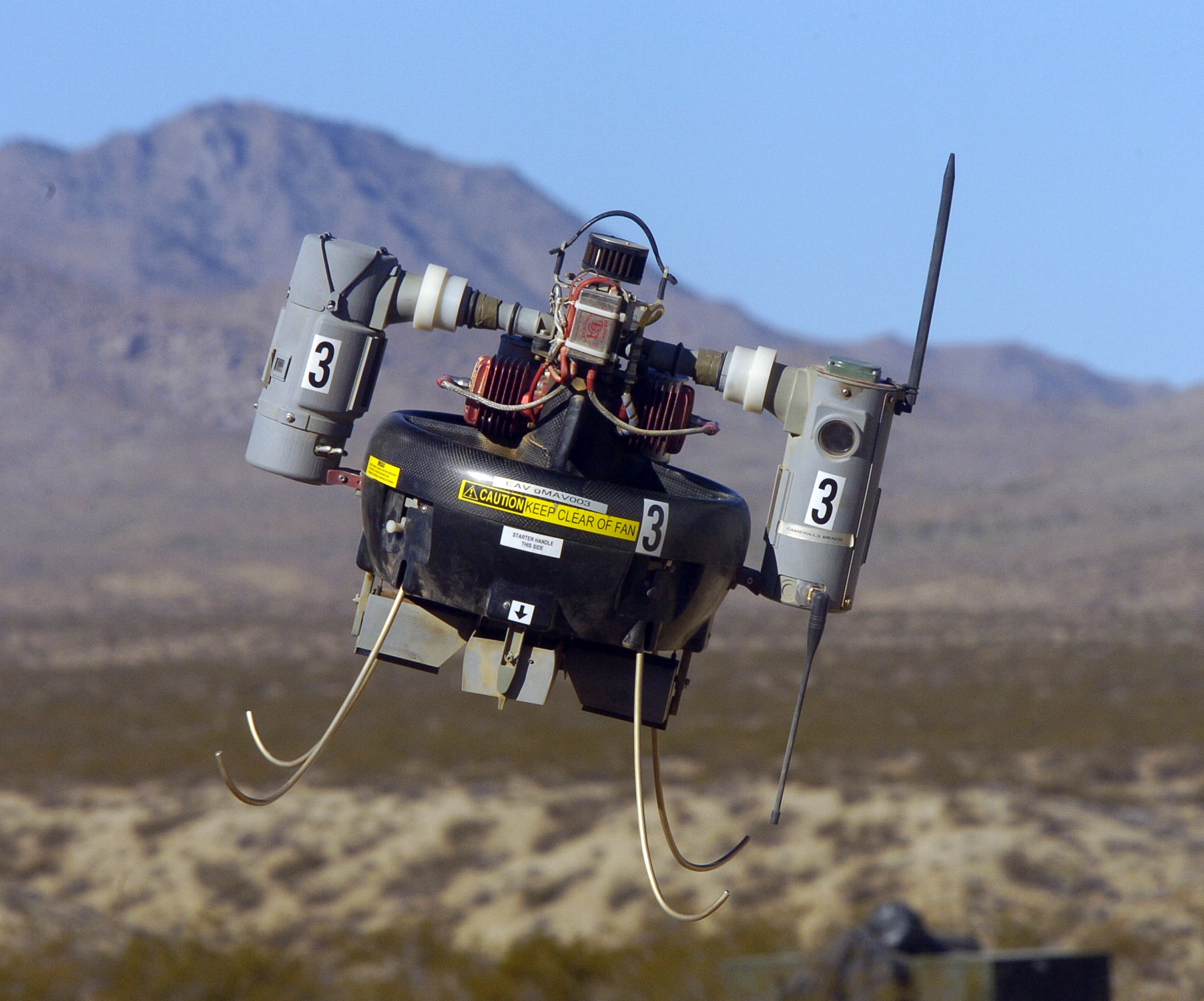
The RQ-16 T-Hawk, a Micro Air Vehicle (MAV), flies over a simulated combat area during an operational test flight.

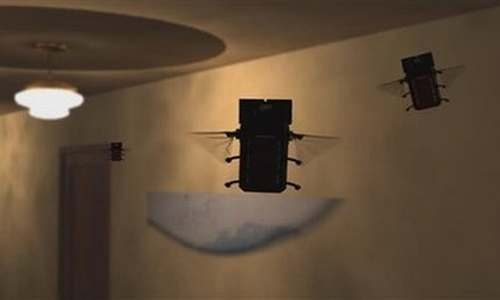
A simulation screenshot of a "bumblebee-sized" MAV proposed by the U.S. Air Force in 2008

A micro air vehicle (MAV), or micro aerial vehicle, is a class of man-portable miniature UAVs whose size enables them to be used in low-altitude, close-in support operations. Modern MAVs can be as small as 5 centimeters - compare Nano Air Vehicle. Development is driven by commercial, research, government, and military organizations; with insect-sized aircraft reportedly expected in the future. The small craft allow remote observation of hazardous environments or of areas inaccessible to ground vehicles. Hobbyists have designed MAVs for applications such as aerial robotics contests and aerial photography. MAVs can offer autonomous modes of flight.

== Practical implementations ==
In 2008, the TU Delft University in the Netherlands developed the smallest ornithopter fitted with a camera, the DelFly Micro, the third version of the DelFly project that started in 2005. This version measures 10 centimeters and weighs 3 grams, slightly larger (and noisier) than the dragonfly on which it was modeled. The importance of the camera lies in remote control when the DelFly is out of sight. However, this version has not yet been successfully tested outside, although it performs well indoors. Researcher David Lentink of Wageningen University, who participated in the development of previous models, DelFly I and DelFly II, says it will take at least half a century to mimic the capabilities of insects, with their low energy consumption and multitude of sensors—not only eyes, but gyroscopes, wind sensors, and much more. He says fly-size ornithopters should be possible, provided the tail is well designed. Rick Ruijsink of TU Delft cites battery weight as the biggest problem; the lithium-ion battery in the DelFly micro, at one gram, constitutes a third of the weight. Luckily, developments in this area are still going very fast, due to the demand in various other commercial fields.

Ruijsink says the purpose of these crafts is to understand insect flight and to provide practical uses, such as flying through cracks in concrete to search for earthquake victims or exploring radioactivity-contaminated buildings. Spy agencies and the military also see potential for such small vehicles as spies and scouts.

Robert Wood at Harvard University developed an even smaller ornithopter, at just 3 centimeters, but this craft is not autonomous in that it gets its power through a wire. The group has achieved controlled hovering flight in 2013 as well as landings on and takeoffs from different overhangs in 2016 (both inside a motion tracking environment).

The T-Hawk MAV, a ducted fan VTOL Micro-UAV, was developed by the United States company Honeywell and entered service in 2007. This MAV is used by the US Army and US Navy Explosive Ordnance Division to search areas for roadside bombs and inspect targets. The device was also deployed at the Fukushima Daiichi Nuclear Power Plant in Japan to provide video and radioactivity readings after the 2011 Tōhoku earthquake and tsunami.

In early 2008, Honeywell received FAA approval to operate its MAV, designated as gMAV in the national airspace on an experimental basis. The gMAV is the fourth MAV to receive such approval. The Honeywell gMAV uses ducted thrust for lift, allowing it to take off and land vertically and to hover. It is also capable of "high-speed" forward flight, according to the company, but no performance figures have been released. The company also states that the machine is light enough to be carried by a man. It was originally developed as part of a DARPA program, and its initial application is expected to be with the police department of Miami-Dade County, Florida.

In January 2010, Tamkang University (TKU) in Taiwan realized autonomous control of flight altitude of an 8-gram, 20-centimeter wide, flapping-wing MAV. The MEMS (MICRO-ELECTRO-MECHANICAL SYSTEMS) Lab of TKU had been developing MAVs for several years, and in 2007 the Space and Flight Dynamics (SFD) Lab joined the research team for the development of autonomous flight MAVs. Instead of traditional sensors and computational devices, which are too heavy for most MAVs, the SFD combined a stereo-vision system with a ground station to control the flight altitude, making it the first flapping-wing MAV under 10 grams that realized autonomous flight.

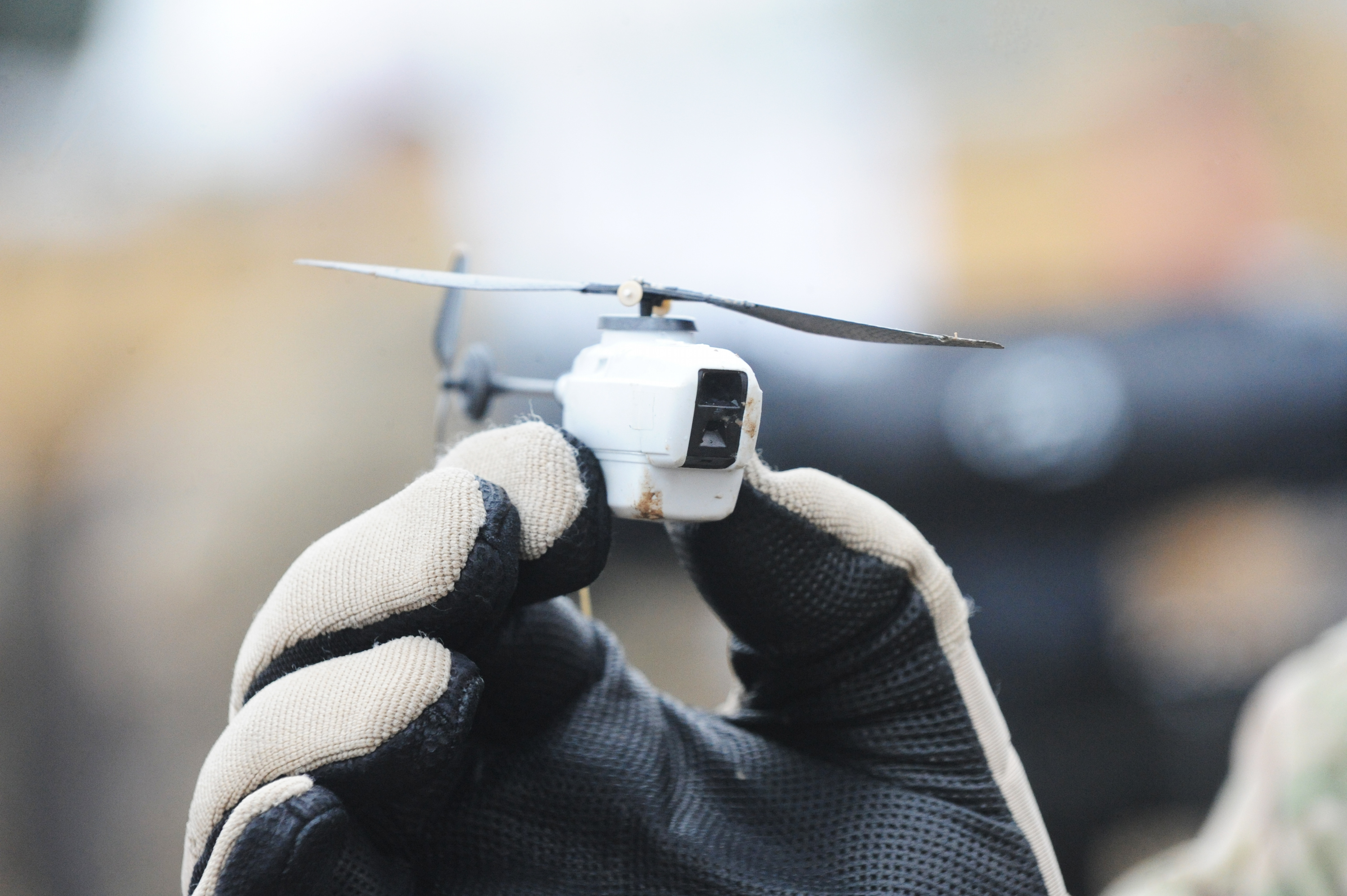
Black Hornet Nano

In 2012, the British Army deployed the sixteen gram Black Hornet Nano Unmanned Air Vehicle to Afghanistan to support infantry operations.

== Practical limitations ==
Although there are currently no true MAVs (i.e., truly micro scaled flyers) in existence, DARPA has attempted a program to develop even smaller Nano Air Vehicles (NAVs) with a wingspan of 7.5 centimeters. However, no NAVs meeting DARPA's original program specification were forthcoming until 2009 when AeroVironment demonstrated a controlled hovering of DARPA's flapping-wing NAV.

Beyond the difficulties in developing MAVs, few designs adequately address control issues. The MAVs' small size makes teleoperation impractical because a ground station pilot cannot see it beyond 100 meters. An onboard camera allowing the ground pilot to stabilize and navigate the craft was first demonstrated in the Aerovironment Black Widow, but truly micro air vehicles cannot carry onboard transmitters powerful enough to allow for teleoperation. For this reason, some researchers have focused on fully autonomous MAV flight. One such device, which has been designed from its inception as a fully autonomous MAV, is the biologically-inspired Entomopter originally developed at the Georgia Institute of Technology under a DARPA contract by Robert C. Michelson.

Given that MAVs can be controlled by autonomous means, significant test and evaluation issues continue to exist. Some of the problems that might be encountered in physical vehicles are being approached through simulations of these models.

Limited flight duration is another limitation these vehicles face. This is especially true for vehicles weighing less than 10 grams, which are constrained to 10 minute flights. Solar-powered MAVs are a potential solution, but payload capacity and poor trade-offs between lift generation and power efficiency reduce their viability. However, Shen et al. (2024) hit upon a vehicle that could subvert these limitations, which they named the CoulombFly. The CoulombFly weighs 4.21 grams, yet can achieve 1 hour flights. This is realized with "an electrostatic-driven propulsion system with a high lift-to-power efficiency of 30.7 g W−1 and an ultralight kilovolt power system with a low power consumption of 0.568 W".

== Bio-inspiration ==
A new trend in the MAV community is to take inspiration from flying insects or birds to achieve unprecedented flight capabilities. Biological systems are not only interesting to MAV engineers for their use of unsteady aerodynamics with flapping wings; they are increasingly inspiring engineers for other aspects such as distributed sensing and acting, sensor fusion and information processing. Recent research within the USAF has focused on development of bird like perching mechanism. A ground mobility and perching mechanism inspired from bird claws was recently developed by Vishwa Robotics and MIT and sponsored by US Air Force Research Laboratory.

Various symposia bringing together biologists and aerial roboticists have been held with increasing frequency since 2000 and some books have recently been published on this topic. Bio-inspiration has been also used in design of methods for stabilization and control of systems of multiple MAVs. Researchers took inspiration from observed behaviors of schools of fish and flocks of birds to control artificial swarms of MAVs and from rules observed in groups of migratory birds to stabilize compact MAV formations.

== See also ==
- AeroVironment Nano Hummingbird
- Entomopter
- DelFly
- History of unmanned aerial vehicles
- Hybrid Insect Micro-Electro-Mechanical Systems
- Miniature helicopter
- Miniature UAVs
- Model aircraft
- Surveillance
- Unmanned aerial vehicle (UAV)
- Honeywell RQ-16 T-Hawk
