= Piccolissimo =

Piccolissimo is a 3D printed single-motor micro drone that is the size of a coin created by engineers at the University of Pennsylvania and named after its creator Matt Piccoli.

Piccolissimo—meaning "smallest" in Italian and related to the creator's surname—is claimed to be the world's smallest self-powered, controllable flying robot. The size of a quarter, it has just two moving parts: the propeller and the 3D-printed body, each of which spins at a different speed. It weighs 2.5 grams and has a payload limit of one gram. A slightly larger and heavier model that is steerable has been developed.

Researchers hope that their drones can be used in swarms for search-and-rescue operations.
