= Ornithopter =

Aircraft which use flapping movement of the wings to generate lift

Pteryx Skybird radio-controlled ornithopter

An ornithopter (from Ancient Greek ὄρνις (órnis) 'bird' and πτερόν (pterón) 'wing') is an aircraft that flies by flapping its wings. Designers sought to imitate the flapping-wing flight of birds, bats, and insects. The term covers a wide range of possible designs. Ornithopters are typically built on the scale of the animals they emulate, however larger, crewed fliers have also found experimental success. Crewed ornithopters are generally powered either by engines or by the pilot.

== Early history ==
Some early crude flight attempts may have been intended to achieve flapping-wing flight, but probably only a glide was actually achieved. They include the purported flights of the 11th-century Catholic monk Eilmer of Malmesbury (recorded in the 12th century) and the 9th-century poet Abbas Ibn Firnas (recorded in the 17th century). Roger Bacon, writing in 1260, was also among the first to consider a technological means of flight. In 1485, Leonardo da Vinci began to study the flight of birds. He grasped that humans are too heavy, and not strong enough, to fly using wings simply attached to the arms. He, therefore, sketched a device in which the aviator lies down on a plank and works two large, membranous wings using hand levers, foot pedals, and a system of pulleys.

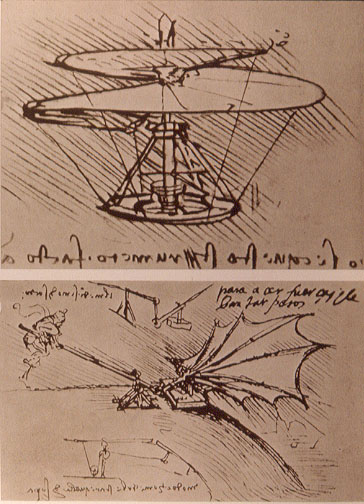
Leonardo da Vinci's ornithopter design

The first successful ornithopter was built by a Polish nobleman and scientist of Italian descent, Tytus Liwiusz Boratyni. In 1648, he built a spring-powered prototype that lifted a cat during a test flight. Tytus Boratyni planned to build a manned version called the "Flying Dragon". The project assumed numerous rescue systems, including a parachute. The bottom of the ornithopter's fuselage was to be able to float on water in the event of an accident over the sea or a lake. In order to implement the project, he unsuccessfully applied for funding for research from King Władysław IV Vasa.

In 1841, Manojlo, a journeyman ironsmith who "came to Belgrade from Vojvodina", attempted flying with a device described as an ornithopter ("flapping wings like those of a bird"). Refused by the authorities a permit to take off from the belfry of Saint Michael's Cathedral, he clandestinely climbed to the rooftop of the Dumrukhana (import tax head office) and took off, landing in a heap of snow, and surviving.

The first ornithopters capable of flight were constructed in France. Jobert in 1871 used a rubber band to power a small model bird. Alphonse Pénaud, Abel Hureau de Villeneuve, and Victor Tatin also made rubber-powered ornithopters during the 1870s. Tatin's ornithopter was perhaps the first to use active torsion of the wings, and apparently it served as the basis for a commercial toy offered by Pichancourt c. 1889. Gustave Trouvé was the first to use internal combustion, and his 1890 model flew a distance of 80 meters in a demonstration for the French Academy of Sciences. The wings were flapped by gunpowder charges activating a Bourdon tube.

From 1884 on, Lawrence Hargrave built scores of ornithopters powered by rubber bands, springs, steam, or compressed air. He introduced the use of small flapping wings providing the thrust for a larger fixed wing; this innovation eliminated the need for gear reduction, thereby simplifying the construction.

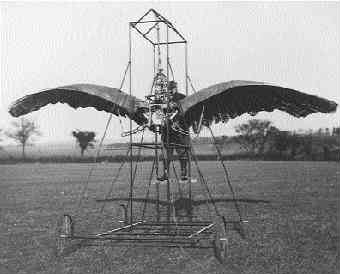
E.P. Frost's 1902 ornithopter

E. P. Frost made ornithopters starting in the 1870s; first models were powered by steam engines, then in the 1900s, an internal-combustion craft large enough for a person was built, though it did not fly.

In the 1930s, Alexander Lippisch and the National Socialist Flyers Corps of Nazi Germany constructed and successfully flew a series of internal combustion-powered ornithopters, using Hargrave's concept of small flapping wings, but with aerodynamic improvements resulting from the methodical study.

Erich von Holst, also working in the 1930s, achieved great efficiency and realism in his work with ornithopters powered by rubber bands. He achieved perhaps the first success of an ornithopter with a bending wing, intended to imitate more closely the folding wing action of birds, although it was not a true variable-span wing such as those of birds.

Around 1960, Percival Spencer successfully flew a series of uncrewed ornithopters using internal combustion engines ranging from 0.020-to-0.80-cubic-inch (0.33 to 13.11 cm^{3}) displacement, and having wingspans up to 8 feet (2.4 m). In 1961, Percival Spencer and Jack Stephenson flew the first successful engine-powered, remotely piloted ornithopter, known as the Spencer Orniplane. The Orniplane had a 90.7-inch (2,300 mm) wingspan, weighed 7.5 pounds (3.4 kg), and was powered by a 0.35-cubic-inch (5.7 cm^{3})-displacement two-stroke engine. It had a biplane configuration, to reduce oscillation of the fuselage.

== Crewed flight ==
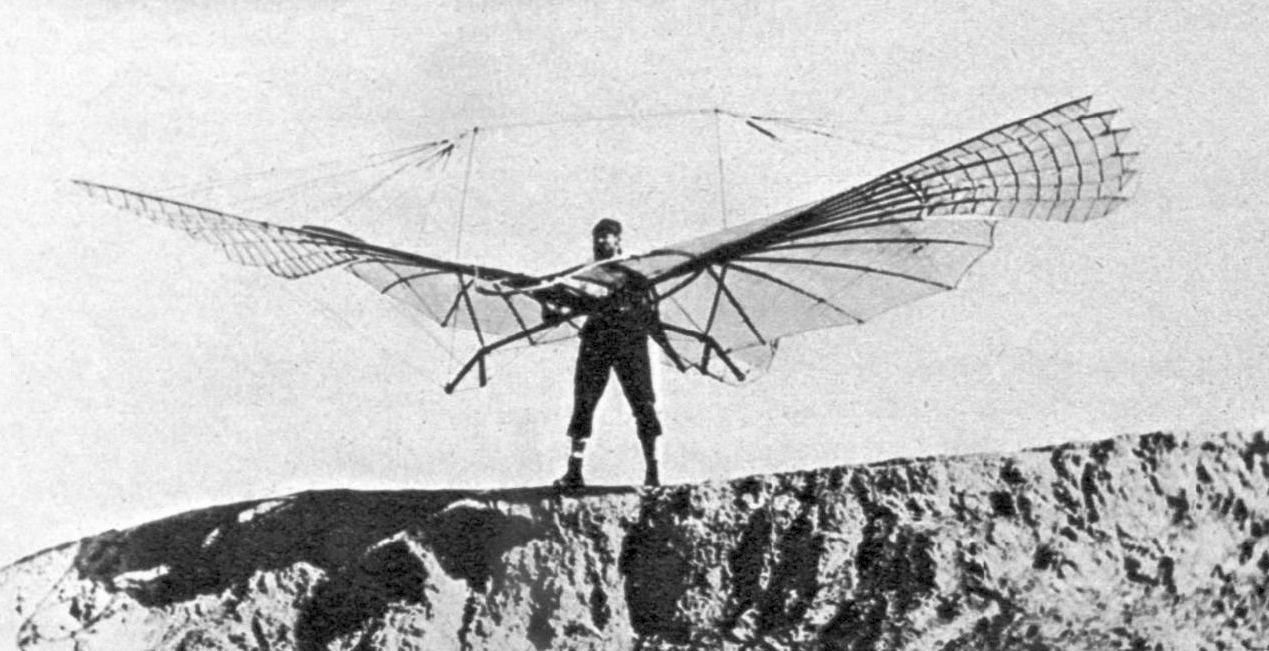
Otto Lilienthal on August 16, 1894, with his kleiner Schlagflügelapparat

Schmid 1942 Ornithopter

Crewed ornithopters fall into two general categories: Those powered by the muscular effort of the pilot (human-powered ornithopters), and those powered by an engine.

One early experimenter was the Dutchman Vincent de Groof in the 1860s and 1870s.

Around 1894, Otto Lilienthal, an aviation pioneer, became famous in Germany for his widely publicized and successful glider flights. Lilienthal also studied bird flight and conducted some related experiments. He constructed an ornithopter, although its complete development was prevented by his untimely death on 9 August 1896 in a glider accident.

In 1929, a man-powered ornithopter designed by Alexander Lippisch (designer of the Messerschmitt Me 163 Komet) flew a distance of 250 to 300 metres (800–1,000 ft) after tow launch. Since a tow launch was used, some have questioned whether the aircraft was capable of flying on its own. Lippisch asserted that the aircraft was actually flying, not making an extended glide. (Precise measurement of altitude and velocity over time would be necessary to resolve this question.) Most of the subsequent human-powered ornithopters likewise used a tow launch, and flights were brief simply because human muscle power diminishes rapidly over time.

In 1942, Adalbert Schmid made a much longer flight of a human-powered ornithopter at Munich-Laim. It travelled a distance of 900 metres (3,000 ft), maintaining a height of 20 metres (65 ft) throughout most of the flight. Later this same aircraft was fitted with a three-horsepower (2.2 kW) Sachs motorcycle engine. With the engine, it made flights up to 15 minutes in duration. Schmid later constructed a 10-horsepower (7.5 kW) ornithopter, based on the Grunau-Baby IIa sailplane, which was flown in 1947. The second aircraft had flapping outer wing panels.

The French engineer René Riout devoted himself for three decades to the realization of flapping wing ornithopters. In 1905 he invented his first models. In 1909 he won the gold medal in the Lépine competition for a reduced model. In 1913 he worked on the development of a model ordered by a pilot, the Dubois-Riout. The tests were stopped in 1916. In 1937, he finalized the Riout 102T Alérion, certainly the most successful piloted flapping wing ornithopter until the second decade of the 21st century. Ultimately, the conclusions of the wind tunnel tests were not favorable to the continuation of the project.

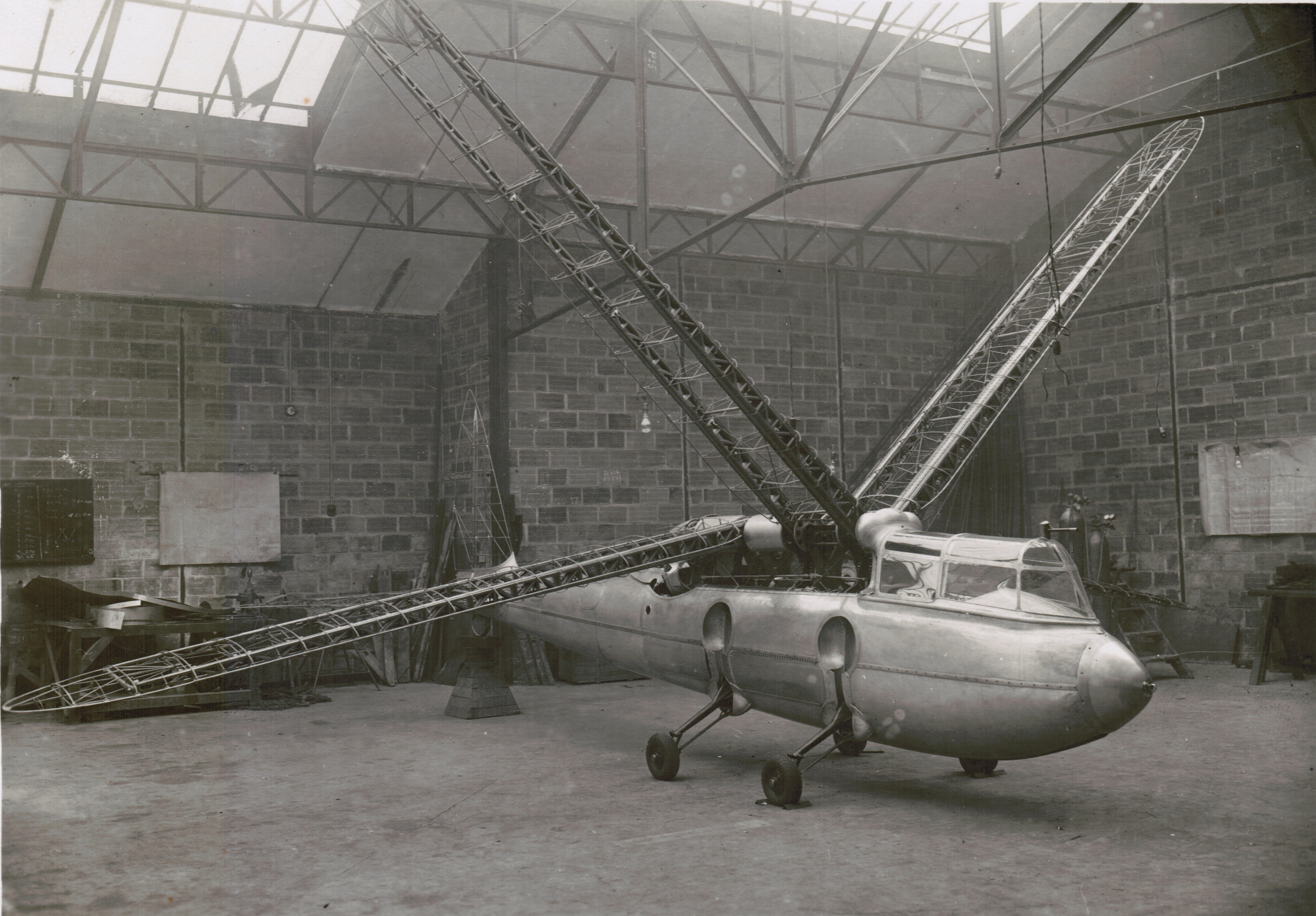
Riout 102T Alérion by René Riout France 1937

In 2005, Yves Rousseau was given the Paul Tissandier Diploma, awarded by the FAI for contributions to the field of aviation. Rousseau attempted his first human-muscle-powered flight with flapping wings in 1995. On 20 April 2006, at his 212th attempt, he succeeded in flying a distance of 64 metres (210 ft), observed by officials of the Aero Club de France. On his 213th flight attempt, a gust of wind led to a wing breaking up, causing the pilot to be gravely injured and rendered paraplegic.

A team at the University of Toronto Institute for Aerospace Studies, headed by Professor James DeLaurier, worked for several years on an engine-powered, piloted ornithopter. In July 2006, at the Bombardier Airfield at Downsview Park in Toronto, Professor DeLaurier's machine, the UTIAS Ornithopter No.1 made a jet-assisted takeoff and 14-second flight. According to DeLaurier, the jet was necessary for sustained flight, but the flapping wings did most of the work.

On August 2, 2010, Todd Reichert of the same institution piloted a human-powered ornithopter named Snowbird. The 32-metre (105 ft) wingspan, 42-kilogram (93 lb) aircraft was constructed from carbon fibre, balsa, and foam. The pilot sat in a small cockpit suspended below the wings and pumped a bar with his feet to operate a system of wires that flapped the wings up and down. Towed by a car until airborne, it then sustained flight for almost 20 seconds. It flew 145 metres (476 ft) with an average speed of 25.6 km/h (15.9 mph). Similar tow-launched flights were made in the past, but improved data collection verified that the ornithopter was capable of self-powered flight once aloft.

== Applications for uncrewed ornithopters ==
Because ornithopters can be made to resemble birds or insects, they could be used for military applications such as aerial reconnaissance without alerting the enemies that they are under surveillance. Several ornithopters have been flown with video cameras on board, some of which can hover and maneuver in small spaces. In 2011, AeroVironment demonstrated a remotely piloted ornithopter resembling a large hummingbird for possible spy missions.

Led by Paul B. MacCready (of Gossamer Albatross fame), AeroVironment developed a half-scale radio-controlled model of the giant pterosaur, Quetzalcoatlus northropi, for the Smithsonian Institution in the mid-1980s. It was built to star in the IMAX movie On the Wing. The model had a 5.5-metre (18 ft) wingspan and featured a complex computerized autopilot control system, just as the full-sized pterosaur relied on its neuromuscular system to make constant adjustments in flight.

Researchers hope to eliminate the motors and gears of current designs by more closely imitating animal flight muscles. Georgia Tech Research Institute's Robert C. Michelson is developing a reciprocating chemical muscle for use in microscale flapping-wing aircraft. Michelson uses the term "entomopter" for this type of ornithopter. SRI International is developing polymer artificial muscles that may also be used for flapping-wing flight.

In 2002, Krister Wolff and Peter Nordin of Chalmers University of Technology in Sweden, built a flapping-wing robot that learned flight techniques. The balsa-wood design was driven by machine learning software technology known as a steady-state linear evolutionary algorithm. Inspired by natural evolution, the software "evolves" in response to feedback on how well it performs a given task. Although confined to a laboratory apparatus, their ornithopter evolved behavior for maximum sustained lift force and horizontal movement.

Since 2002, Prof. Theo van Holten has been working on an ornithopter that is constructed like a helicopter. The device is called the "ornicopter" and was made by constructing the main rotor so that it would have no reaction torque.

In 2008, Amsterdam Airport Schiphol started using a realistic-looking mechanical hawk designed by falconer Robert Musters. The radio-controlled robot bird is used to scare away birds that could damage the engines of airplanes.

In 2012, RoBird (formerly Clear Flight Solutions), a spin-off of the University of Twente, started making artificial birds of prey (called RoBird®) for airports and agricultural and waste-management industries.

Adrian Thomas and Alex Caccia founded Animal Dynamics Ltd in 2015, to develop a mechanical analogue of dragonflies to be used as a drone that will outperform quadcopters. The work is funded by the Defence Science and Technology Laboratory, the research arm of the British Ministry of Defence, and the United States Air Force.

== Hobby ==
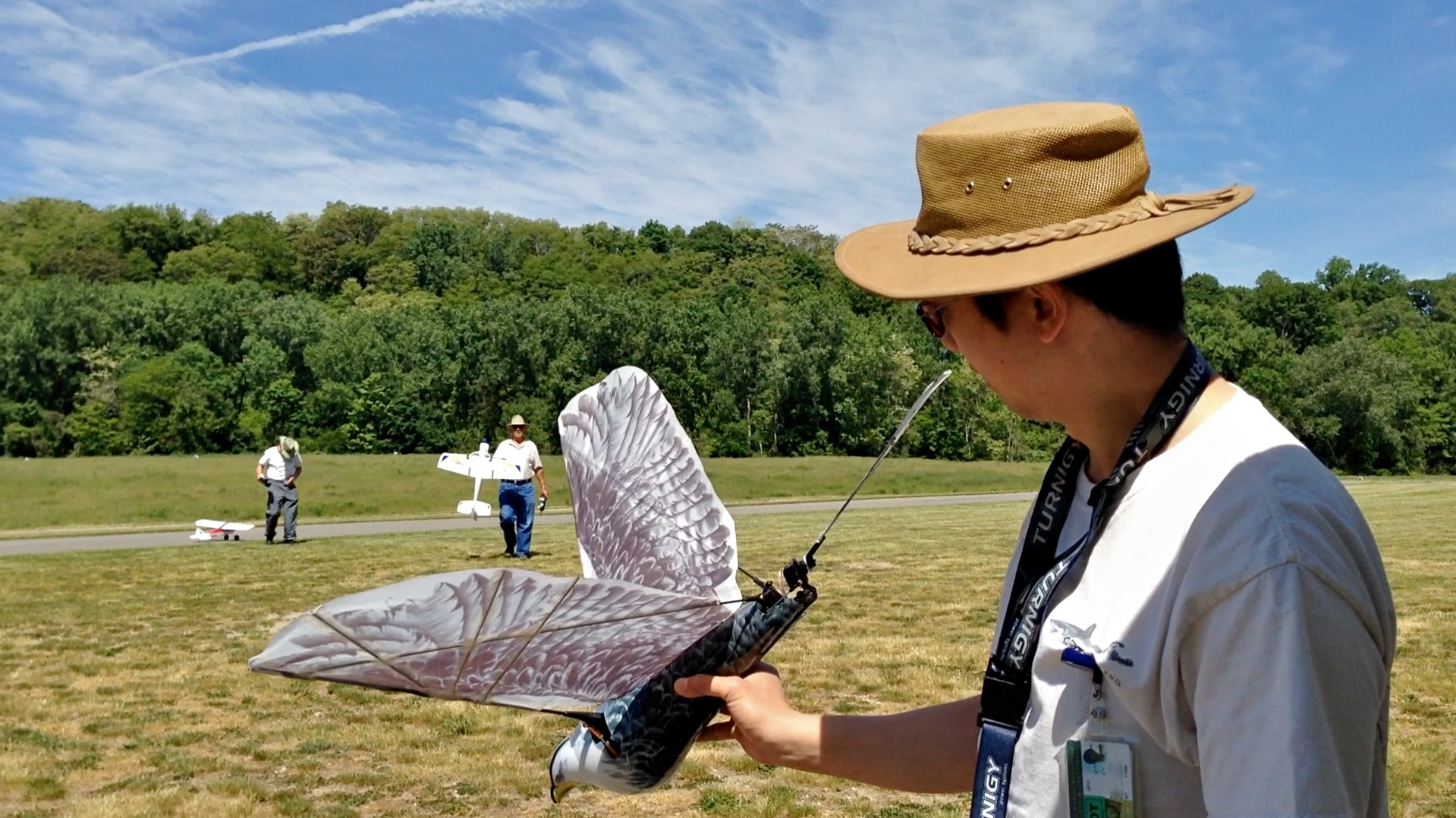
Skyonme Spybird

Hobbyists build and fly their own ornithopters. These range from light-weight models powered by rubber bands, to larger models with radio control.

The rubber-band-powered model can be fairly simple in design and construction. Hobbyists compete for the longest flight times with these models. An introductory model can be fairly simple in design and construction, but the advanced competition designs are extremely delicate and challenging to build. Roy White holds the United States national record for indoor rubber-powered, with his flight time of 21 minutes, 44 seconds.

Commercial free-flight rubber-band-powered toy ornithopters have long been available. The first of these was sold under the name Tim Bird in Paris in 1879. Later models were also sold as Tim Bird (made by G de Ruymbeke, France, since 1969).

Commercial radio-controlled designs stem from Percival Spencer's engine-powered Seagulls, developed circa 1958, and Sean Kinkade's work in the late 1990s to present day. The wings are usually driven by an electric motor. Many hobbyists enjoy experimenting with their own new wing designs and mechanisms. The opportunity to interact with real birds in their own domain also adds great enjoyment to this hobby. Birds are often curious and will follow or investigate the model while it is flying. In a few cases, RC birds have been attacked by birds of prey, crows, and even cats. More recent cheaper models such as the Dragonfly from WowWee have extended the market from dedicated hobbyists to the general toy market.

Some helpful resources for hobbyists include The Ornithopter Design Manual, book written by Nathan Chronister, and The Ornithopter Zone web site, which includes a large amount of information about building and flying these models.

Ornithopters were also of interest as the subject of one of the former events in the American nationwide Science Olympiad event list. The event ("Flying Bird") entailed building a self-propelled ornithopter to exacting specifications, with points awarded for high flight time and low weight. Bonus points were also awarded if the ornithopter happened to look like a real bird.

== Aerodynamics ==
As demonstrated by birds, flapping wings offer potential advantages in maneuverability and energy savings compared with fixed-wing aircraft as well as potential for vertical take-off and landing. It has been suggested that these advantages are greatest at small sizes and low flying speeds, but the development of comprehensive aerodynamic theory for flapping remains an outstanding problem due to the complex non-linear nature of such unsteady separating flows.

Unlike airplanes and helicopters, the driving airfoils of the ornithopter have a flapping or oscillating motion, instead of rotary. As with helicopters, the wings usually have a combined function of providing both lift and thrust. Theoretically, the flapping wing can be set to zero angle of attack on the upstroke, so it passes easily through the air. Since typically the flapping airfoils produce both lift and thrust, drag-inducing structures are minimized. These two advantages potentially allow a high degree of efficiency.

=== Wing design ===
If future crewed motorized ornithopters cease to be "exotic", imaginary, unreal aircraft and start to serve humans as junior members of the aircraft family, designers and engineers will need to solve not only wing design problems but many other problems involved in making them safe and reliable aircraft. Some of these problems, such as stability, controllability, and durability, are necessary for all aircraft. Other problems specific to ornithopters will appear; optimizing flapping-wing design is only one of them.

An effective ornithopter must have wings capable of generating both thrust, the force that propels the craft forward, and lift, the force (perpendicular to the direction of flight) that keeps the craft airborne. These forces must be strong enough to counter the effects of drag and the weight of the craft.

Leonardo's ornithopter designs were inspired by his study of birds, and conceived the use of flapping motion to generate thrust and provide the forward motion necessary for aerodynamic lift. However, using materials available at that time the craft would be too heavy and require too much energy to produce sufficient lift or thrust for flight. Alphonse Pénaud introduced the idea of a powered ornithopter in 1874. His design had limited power and was uncontrollable, causing it to be transformed into a toy for children. More recent vehicles, such as the human-powered ornithopters of Lippisch (1929) and Emiel Hartman (1959), were capable powered gliders but required a towing vehicle in order to take off and may not have been capable of generating sufficient lift for sustained flight. Hartman's ornithopter lacked the theoretical background of others based on the study of winged flight, but exemplified the idea of an ornithopter as a birdlike machine rather than a machine that directly copies birds' method of flight. The 1960s saw powered uncrewed ornithopters of various sizes capable of achieving and sustaining flight, providing valuable real-world examples of mechanical winged flight. In 1991, Harris and DeLaurier flew the first successful engine-powered remotely piloted ornithopter in Toronto, Canada. In 1999, a piloted ornithopter based on this design flew, capable of taking off from level pavement and executing sustained flight.

An ornithopter's flapping wings and their motion through the air are designed to maximize the amount of lift generated within limits of weight, material strength and mechanical complexity. A flexible wing material can increase efficiency while keeping the driving mechanism simple. In wing designs with the spar sufficiently forward of the airfoil that the aerodynamic center is aft of the elastic axis of the wing, aeroelastic deformation causes the wing to move in a manner close to its ideal efficiency (in which pitching angles lag plunging displacements by approximately 90 degrees.) Flapping wings increase drag and are not as efficient as propeller-powered aircraft. Some designs achieve increased efficiency by applying more power on the down stroke than on the upstroke, as do most birds.

In order to achieve the desired flexibility and minimum weight, engineers and researchers have experimented with wings that require carbon fiber, plywood, fabric, and ribs, with a stiff, strong trailing edge. Any mass located aft of the empennage reduces the wing's performance, so lightweight materials and empty space are used where possible. To minimize drag and maintain the desired shape, choice of a material for the wing surface is also important. In DeLaurier's experiments, a smooth aerodynamic surface with a double-surface airfoil is more efficient at producing lift than a single-surface airfoil.

Other ornithopters do not necessarily act like birds or bats in flight. Typically birds and bats have thin and cambered wings to produce lift and thrust. Ornithopters with thinner wings have a limited angle of attack but provide optimum minimum-drag performance for a single lift coefficient.

Although hummingbirds fly with fully extended wings, such flight is not feasible for an ornithopter. If an ornithopter wing were to fully extend and twist and flap in small movements it would cause a stall, and if it were to twist and flap in very large motions, it would act like a windmill causing an inefficient flying situation.

A team of engineers and researchers called "Fullwing" has created an ornithopter that has an average lift of over 8 pounds, an average thrust of 0.88 pounds, and a propulsive efficiency of 54%. The wings were tested in a low-speed wind tunnel measuring the aerodynamic performance, showing that the higher the frequency of the wing beat, the higher the average thrust of the ornithopter.

== In fiction ==
Fictional ornithopters are depicted in Frank Herbert's Dune series, where they are the primary form of air transportation used by House Atreides in the desert climate of the planet Arrakis.

== See also ==
- Cyclogyro
- Gyroplane
- Human-powered aircraft
- Insectothopter
- Micro air vehicle
- Micromechanical Flying Insect
- Nano Hummingbird
- Rotary-wing aircraft

	Aerostat	Aerodyne		
	Lift: Lighter than air gas	Lift: Fixed wing	Lift: Unpowered rotor	Lift: Powered rotor
Unpowered free flight	(Free) balloon	Glider	Helicopter, etc. in autorotation	(None – see note 2)
Tethered (static or towed)	Tethered balloon	Kite	Rotor kite	(None – see note 2)
Powered	Airship	Airplane, ornithopter, etc.	Autogyro	Gyrodyne, helicopter
