= SSSA =

SSSA may refer to:

- Soil Science Society of America
- Sant'Anna School of Advanced Studies
- Soaring Society of South Africa
- SSSA, the Kolkata Metro station code for Salt Lake Stadium metro station, West Bengal, India
