= Gliding New Zealand =

Gliding Association

- Sport: Gliding
- Abbreviation: GNZ
- Founded: 1947

Official website
- www.gliding.co.nz
- (New Zealand)

Gliding New Zealand (GNZ) controls the sport of gliding in New Zealand for those clubs and other organisations that are affiliated to it. It sets standards and manages the training of pilots, instructors, engineers and tow pilots. It also organises contests, selects teams for world competitions, and represents New Zealand on the International Gliding Commission.

The New Zealand Gliding Association was founded in 1947 and renamed 'Gliding New Zealand' in August 2000. GNZ is authorised under regulations called 'Part 149' by New Zealand's Civil Aviation Authority that allows it to conduct flying training courses for pilots, instructors, engineers, and tow pilots, conduct competency assessments, authorise glider maintenance and to administer the associated personnel certification processes. It also

- Liaises with government agencies, in particular with the Civil Aviation Authority
- Encourages competitions
- Liaises with international gliding organisations
- Promotes the sport of gliding

GNZ has 25 constituent members (clubs and schools), who represent about 900 pilots and operate over 360 gliders. GNZ represents 8% of all registered aircraft in New Zealand.

GNZ annually elects an executive committee (president, vice president and three members) and a secretary. Persons appointed to the following positions assist the executive committee:

- Operations officer
- Airworthiness officer
- Airspace officer
- Executive officer

Each of the national officers is supported by appointed committee members who have responsibility for the various regions of New Zealand. GNZ officers conduct on-going audits of operational and maintenance activities. There are additionally a number of other appointees such as the medical officer, awards officer, quality manager, publicity officer, and the webmaster.

== See also ==
- FAI Gliding Commission
- History of aviation in New Zealand
- National gliding associations
