= Honeywell RQ-16 T-Hawk =

American miniature UAV

RQ-16 T-Hawk
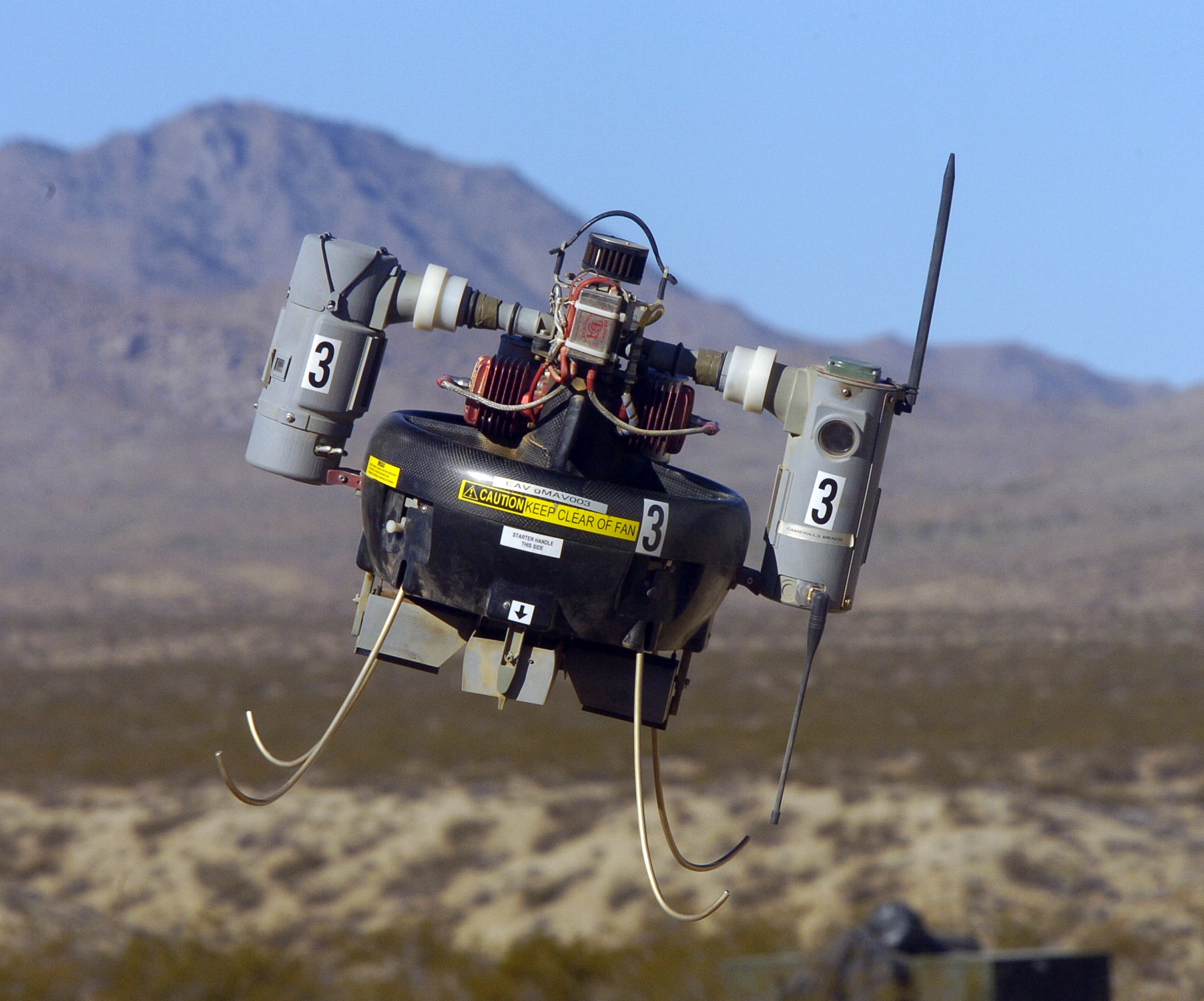
- RQ-16 T-Hawk

General information
- Type: Surveillance UAV
- National origin: United States
- Manufacturer: Honeywell
- Primary user: United States Army

The Honeywell RQ-16A T-Hawk (for "Tarantula hawk", a wasp species) is a ducted fan VTOL miniature UAV. Developed by Honeywell, it is suitable for backpack deployment and single-person operation.

== Development ==
The Micro Air Vehicle (MAV) program was launched by DARPA. Following a $40 million technology demonstration contract to Honeywell Defense and Space Electronic Systems in 2003, the MAV project was transferred to United States Army's Future Combat System (FCS) program to fulfill the need for Class I platoon-level drone. In May 2006, Honeywell was awarded a $61 million contract to develop an advanced MAV with extended endurance and heavy-fuel engine.

In 2007, the United States Navy awarded Honeywell a $7.5 million contract for 20 G-MAVs (denoting the use of a gasoline engine) for deployment to Iraq with the U.S. Multi-Service Explosive Ordnance Disposal Group. The hovering feature of MAV has been critical for U.S. forces in Iraq that search for roadside bombs. Military convoys have been using MAVs to fly ahead and scan the roads. A MAV's benefit is its ability to inspect a target — a suspicious vehicle, structure, or disturbed earth — from close range, covering ground much more quickly than an unmanned ground vehicle and without putting people at risk.

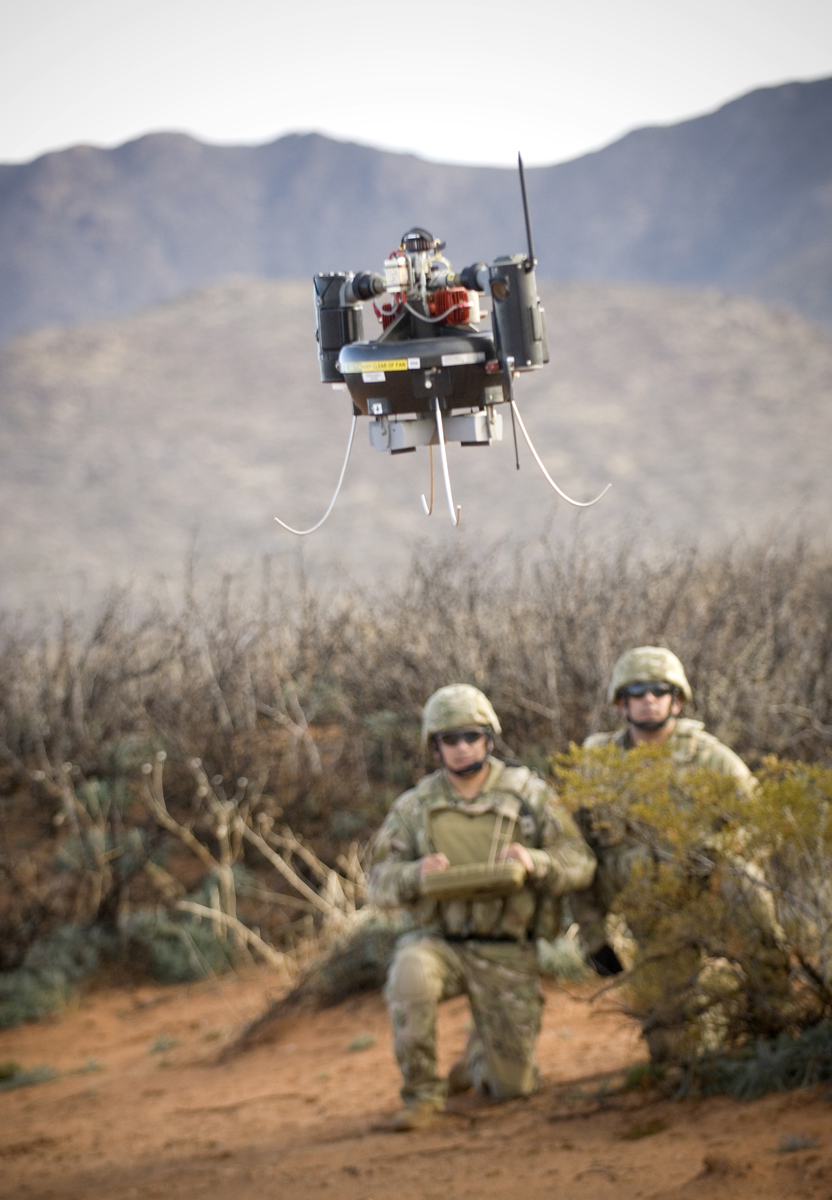
RQ-16 in use on the field

The Iraq trials were so successful that the U.S. Navy placed a surprise order for 372 MAVs, designated RQ-16A T-Hawk, in January 2008 for Explosive Ordnance Disposal (EOD) teams. The 186 MAV systems each consist of two air vehicles and one ground station. In January 2009, the United Kingdom was reported to have ordered five complete T-Hawk systems for delivery by 2010. In April 2010, Honeywell conducted demonstrations of the T-Hawk's at the Counter Terrorism and Jungle Warfare College, Kanker, Chhattisgarh. As a result, Indian security forces are set to conduct user trials.

== Design ==
The gasoline engine powered RQ-16 is reported to weigh 8.4 kilograms (20 lb), have an endurance of around 40 minutes, 10,500-foot (3,200 m) ceiling and an operating radius of about 6 nautical miles (11 km). Forward speeds up to 70 knots (130 km/h) have been achieved, but the G-MAV is operationally restricted to 50 knots (93 km/h) by software. VTOL operation is subject to a maximum wind speed of 15 knots (28 km/h). Sensors include one forward and one downward looking daylight or IR cameras.

== U.S. Army service ==
Designated XM156 (or Class I) by the United States Army, the aircraft was intended to provide the dismounted soldier with reconnaissance, surveillance, and target acquisition (RSTA) and laser designation. Total system weight, which includes the air vehicle, a control device, and ground support equipment is less than 51 pounds (23 kg) and is back-packable in two custom MOLLE-type carriers.

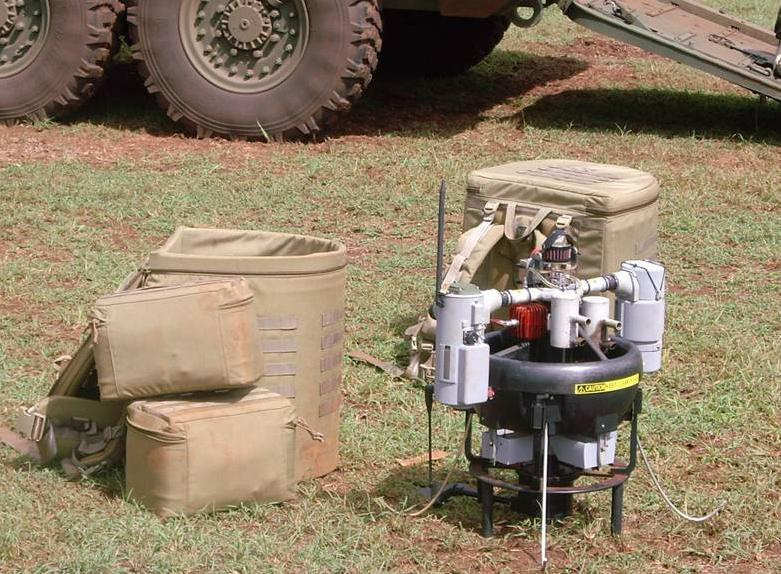
Portable in two backpacks

This micro air vehicle operates in open, rolling, complex and urban terrains with a vertical take-off and landing capability. It was interoperable with select ground and air platforms and controlled by mounted or dismounted soldiers. The Class I used autonomous flight and navigation, but it would interact with the network and soldier to dynamically update routes and target information. It provided dedicated reconnaissance support and early warning to the smallest echelons of the brigade combat team (BCT) in environments not suited to larger assets.

The Class I system provided a hover and stare capability that was not available in the Army UAV inventory for urban and route surveillance. The Class I system also filled known gaps that existed in force operations, such as: protect force in counterinsurgency (COIN) operations, soldier protection in COIN environment, ability to conduct joint urban operations, enhanced ISR/RSTA capabilities, hover and stare operations.

The Class I UAV was part of Spin Out 1 and entered evaluation by soldiers at the Army Evaluation Task Force (AETF). It was to be fielded to infantry brigade combat teams (IBCT) starting in 2011. However, the Army issued Honeywell a stop-work order on January 6, 2011, with formal termination on February 3 the following month. Its role has gone to the Puma AE.

== Continued service ==
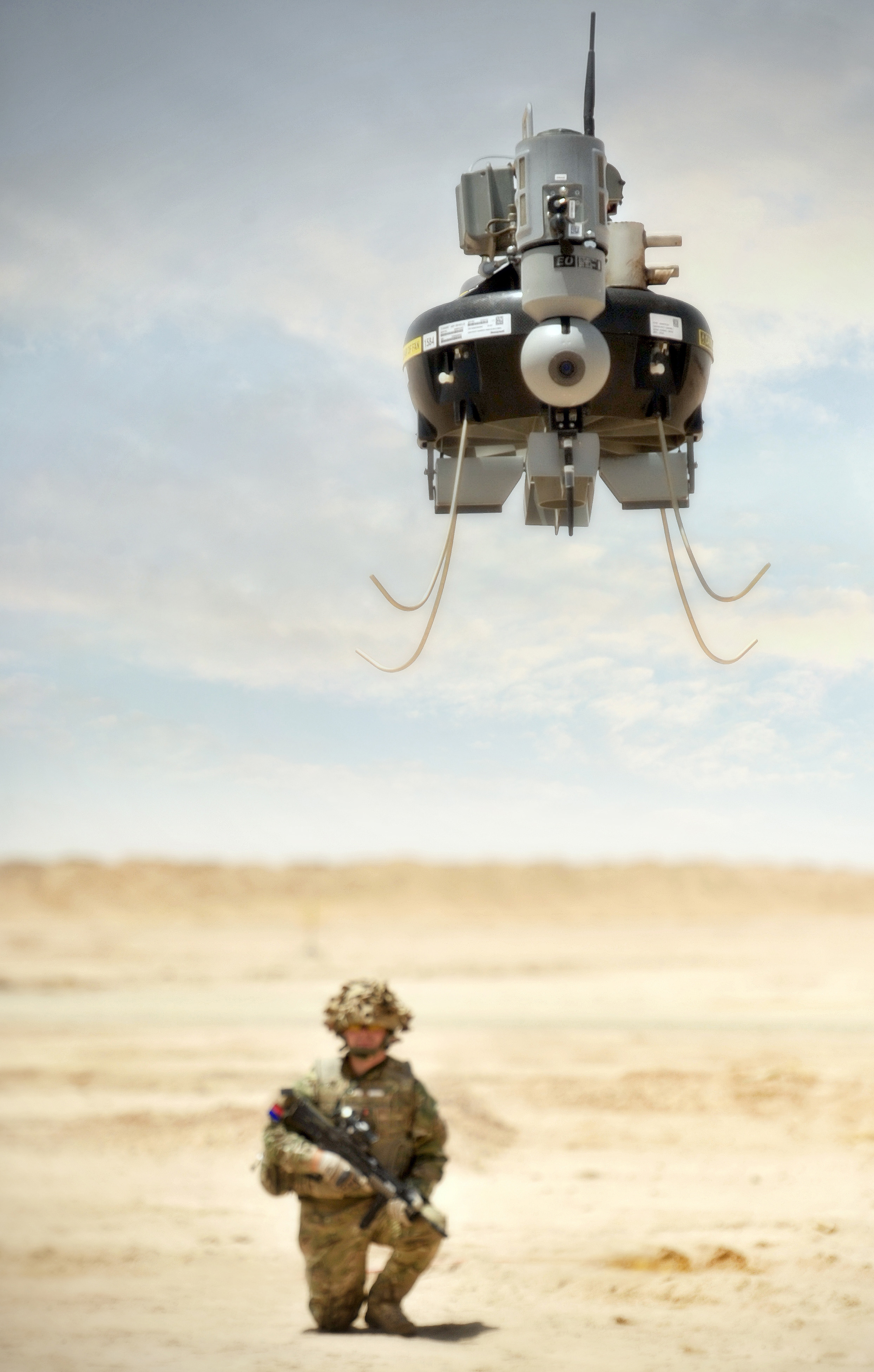
T-Hawk of the UK's Talisman counter-IED force, 2012

On September 19, 2012, Honeywell was awarded a support contract for the RQ-16B Block II T-Hawk. Despite the Class I UAV program being cancelled, RQ-16s were still being used in the field in Afghanistan.

As of 25 October 2013, the British Army has 18 T-Hawks in service as part of its Talisman suite of counter-IED tools. 15 Field Support Squadron of 21 Engineer Regiment were the first troops to use Talisman operationally, in Afghanistan in 2010.

== Civilian application at disaster site ==
On Friday, April 15, 2011, a T-Hawk drone was used to conduct surveillance of the damaged Fukushima Dai-Ichi nuclear power station. This nuclear plant suffered severe damage as a result of a devastating earthquake and tsunami which struck the east coast of Japan one month earlier. The damage resulted in several of the reactors at the facility undergoing partial meltdown, releasing radioactivity into the local area. The radiation was thousands of times above the safe limit for exposure, making the area unsafe for human habitation. The radiation was intense enough to make even short-term exposure hazardous, preventing people from going in to assess the damage. The T-Hawk drone took numerous photographs of the damaged reactor housings, turbine buildings, spent nuclear fuel rod containment pools, and associated facilities damaged by the earthquake, tsunami, and subsequent hydrogen gas explosions at the facility. This allowed Tokyo Electric Power Co. (TEPCO) to better determine where the releases of radioactivity were coming from and how to best deal with them.

On Friday, June 24, 2011, a T-Hawk apparently crash-landed on the roof of the number 2 reactor building at Fukushima.

== Specifications (approximate) ==
Data from Honeywell T Hawk Described

General characteristics

- Crew: None
- Gross weight: 18.5 lb (8.39 kg)
- Fuel capacity: 2.1 lb (0.95 kg)
- Powerplant: 1 × 3W-Modellmotoren 3W-56 56cc Boxer Twin piston engine , 4 hp (3 kW)

Performance

- Maximum speed: 81 mph (130 km/h, 70 kn)
- Endurance: 40 minutes
- Service ceiling: 10,500 ft (3,200 m)
- Operational altitude: 100-200 ft (30-70 m)

== See also ==
- Hiller VZ-1 Pawnee
