= James DeLaurier =

James D. DeLaurier is an inventor and professor emeritus of the University of Toronto Institute for Aerospace Studies. He is a leader in design and analysis of lighter than air vehicles and flapping winged aircraft.

== Career ==
He received his bachelor of science degree from the University of Illinois at Urbana-Champaign and his PhD in Aeronautics and Astronautics from Stanford University. He then worked at the NASA Ames Research Center during the Apollo Program in 1965–66. In 1970 he began working with Sheldahl Corporation to develop scientific balloon designs and he designed a wing shaped balloon that would later be the inspiration for a new design of solar hybrid airship.

In 1974 DeLaurier established a research team at UTIAS, and was in charge of the Low-Speed Aerodynamics Laboratory. The DeLaurier lab developed wind tunnel models and flying prototypes for a new breed of airships including the Magnus Airship in the mid 1980s. His team designed flight-dynamic simulation for airships and aerostats that have been used for the certification of new commercial airships in England, the U.S. and Germany. The team, along with John Martin, designed the first successful free-flying aircraft solely powered by microwave power transmission. This project was the initiative of the Communications Research Centre, and was called SHARP (Stationary High-Altitude Relay Platform). The DeLaurier lab, along with Jeremy M. Harris, designed and built a proof-of-concept scaled ornithopter that is recognized by the Fédération Aéronautique Internationale as the world's first successful remotely piloted engine-powered flapping-wing aircraft (UTIAS Ornithopter No.1 or, more commonly, "Mr. Bill").

The team then went on to design and build an engine-powered human-carrying ornithopter, called "The Great Flapper", which took off from the ground and sustained flight on 8 July 2006. The thrust from the flapping wings was boosted by a model-aircraft jet engine.

== Recognition ==
- "Diplôme d'Honneur" from the Fédération Aéronautique Internationale – 1988 (SHARP project) and 1991 (ornithopter project)
- Popular Science "Best of What's New" award – 1992 (ornithopter project) and 2002 (Mentor MAV)
- Popular Mechanics "Design and Engineering" award – 1993 (ornithopter project)
- Rolex "Spirit of Enterprise" Award – 1993 (ornithopter project)
- Canadian Aeronautics and Space Institute “Romeo Vachon Award” – 1994 (ornithopter project) and “McCurdy Award”- 2007 (achievement in creative aspects of aeronautical engineering)
- Berblinger Prize for innovative aircraft from Ulm, Germany – 1998 (ornithopter project)
