= UTIAS Snowbird =

Canadian human-powered ornithopter

Snowbird
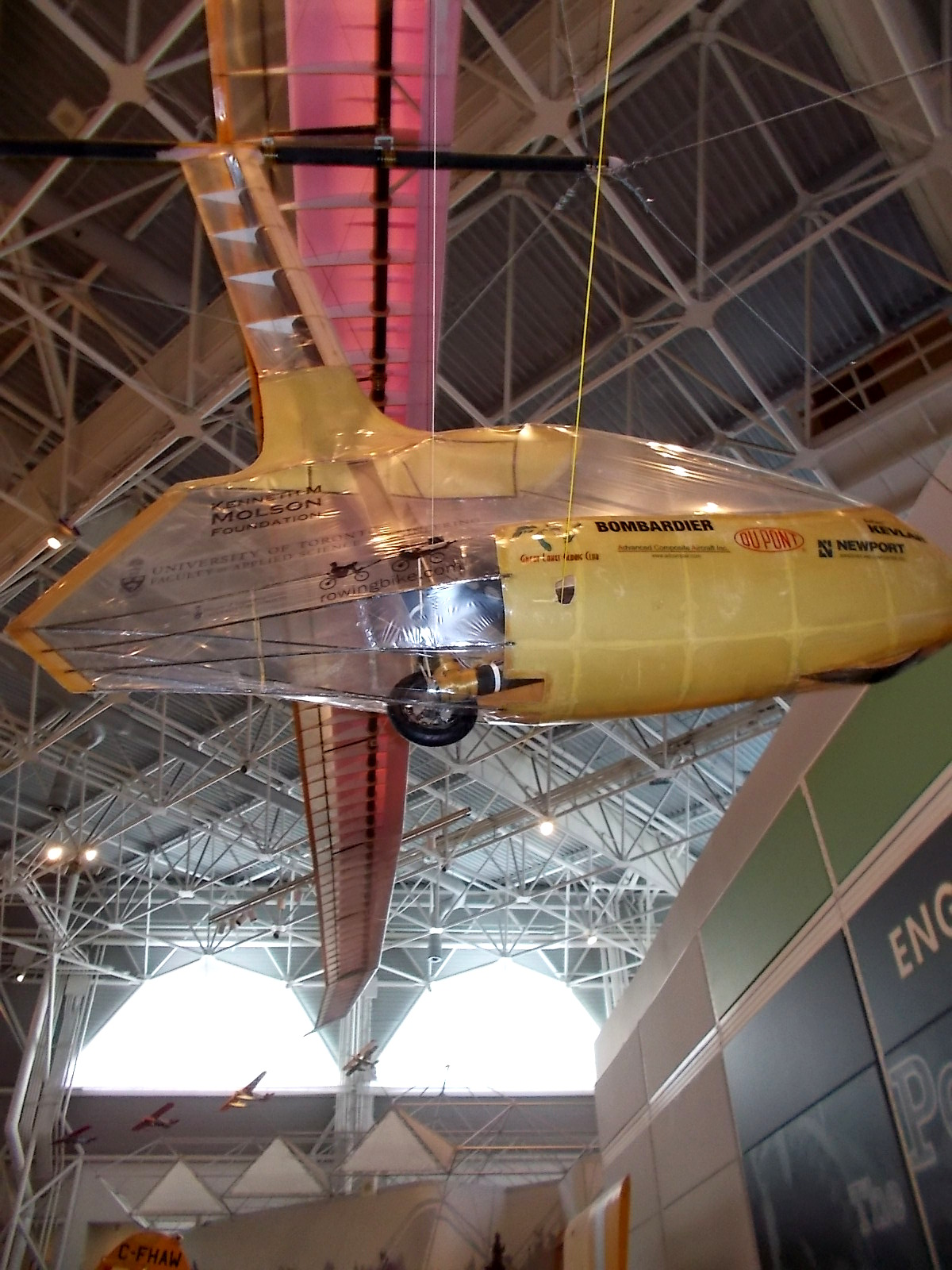
- The UTIAS Snowbird human-powered ornithopter on display at the Canada Aviation and Space Museum in Ottawa, Ontario, Canada.

General information
- Type: Human-powered Ornithopter
- National origin: Canada
- Manufacturer: UTIAS Human-Powered Ornithopter Project
- Status: retired
- Primary user: HPO Project
- Number built: 1

History
- First flight: 31 July 2010
- Retired: 2 August 2010

The Snowbird is a human-powered ornithopter that was built as a project of the University of Toronto Institute for Aerospace Studies (UTIAS). Snowbird was the first human-powered ornithopter to fly straight and level.

== Design and development ==
=== Background ===
There have been several attempts throughout history of humans attempting to fly like a bird, under their own power. Leonardo da Vinci is frequently credited with creating the first design for a human-powered ornithopter in 1485. Since that time, many people have tried to make human-powered flight like a bird happen.

In 1991, the Fédération Aéronautique Internationale (FAI) awarded a “Diplôme d’Honneur” for the first remotely operated engine-powered ornithopter, which was developed by Professor James DeLaurier and UTIAS.

In 2006, the UTIAS Ornithopter No.1 flew. It required the assistance of a jet engine to take off, and its flapping wings were driven by an 18 kW (24 HP) gasoline engine.

=== Ornithopter Project ===
The Human-Powered Ornithopter Project (HPO) started in the summer of 2006, as a spin-off of the University of Toronto Institute for Aerospace Studies (UTIAS) flapping-wing research program. The design was run in simulations to check feasibility before committing to construction.

The aircraft has a wingspan of 32 metres (105 ft) (comparable to a Boeing 737), and weighs 43 kilograms (95 lb). It cost $200,000 CDN (approx. US$200,000), not including donated material and time. It was built primarily with carbon fibre, balsa wood, basswood and foam. The pedals are connected to the wings through a system of pumps and pulleys. Snowbird does not have launch runup equipment, because of the need to limit weight, and requires a tow-assist at launch. The downward flap required 700 pounds-force (3,100 N). It was built under the supervision of professor James DeLaurier, a NASA alumnus. The craft was built under the University of Toronto's Human Powered Ornithopter Project. The name came about when, during testing on a snowy field, the cockpit became filled with snow.

The team expects that revised iterations of the aircraft with greater performance will be made.

== Flight test history ==
The Snowbird completed successful free-flights prior to its officially monitored record run. It took to the air on 31 July 2010.

=== Record run ===
For its official aviation-first flight, it was piloted by Todd Reichert, a 28-year-old PhD graduate student of the University of Toronto's Institute for Aerospace Studies. The record flight was observed by a certified official from the Fédération Aéronautique Internationale (FAI), and GPS data detailing the altitude and length of flight were given to the organization for certification. Snowbird flew for 19.3 seconds in a straight-and-level powered flight run under human power alone. It averaged 25.6 kilometres per hour (15.9 mph), over a length of 145 metres (476 ft). Take-off was assisted with a tow from a car to get the aircraft up to speed, before flapping for lift-off. A total of 16 flaps were used on the run to maintain height. At the start of the flight, data indicates that the Snowbird was able to gain height, while maintaining speed, indicating that there was more power than necessary to maintain straight-and-level flight. The run occurred at the Great Lakes Gliding Club, in Tottenham, Ontario, on 2 August 2010, at around 6:45 am. Reichert estimates that each stroke needed 600–700 watts (0.80–0.94 bhp), with 700–800 pounds-force (3,100–3,600 N) on each stroke. Analysis of the flight afterward indicated that 15-20 power strokes is the limit of endurance for the pilot. The validity of the record claim has been disputed due to prior claims and, apparent in Reichert's flight data, a downward trend in total energy and airspeed during the 19.3 second interval claimed as a sustained flight.

=== Fate ===
On the last flight of 2 August 2010, a main drive line failed. Fatigue wear was noted on many components. With training of the pilot, with the intent of peaking for the record attempt, it was decided to end flights for the season.

The team hopes to have an entry in the Guinness Book of World Records. The aircraft currently resides in the Main Hangar of the Canada Aviation and Space Museum, in Ottawa.

== Specifications ==
General characteristics

- Crew: 1
- Wingspan: 32 m (105 ft 0 in)
- Wing area: 29.2 m^{2} (314 sq ft)
- Aspect ratio: 35.07
- Empty weight: 43 kg (95 lb)
- Gross weight: 114.3 kg (252 lb)
- Powerplant: 1 × human power via pedals which are connected to the wings through a system of pumps and pulleys , 0.680 kW (0.912 hp)

Performance

- Cruise speed: 25.6 km/h (15.9 mph, 13.8 kn)
- Range: 0.145 km (0.090 mi, 0.078 nmi)
- Endurance: 19.3 seconds (demonstrated)
- Wing loading: 3.915 kg/m^{2} (0.802 lb/sq ft)

== See also ==
Aircraft of comparable role, configuration, and era

- UTIAS Ornithopter No.1
