= Riout 102T Alérion =

Ornithopter built in 1937

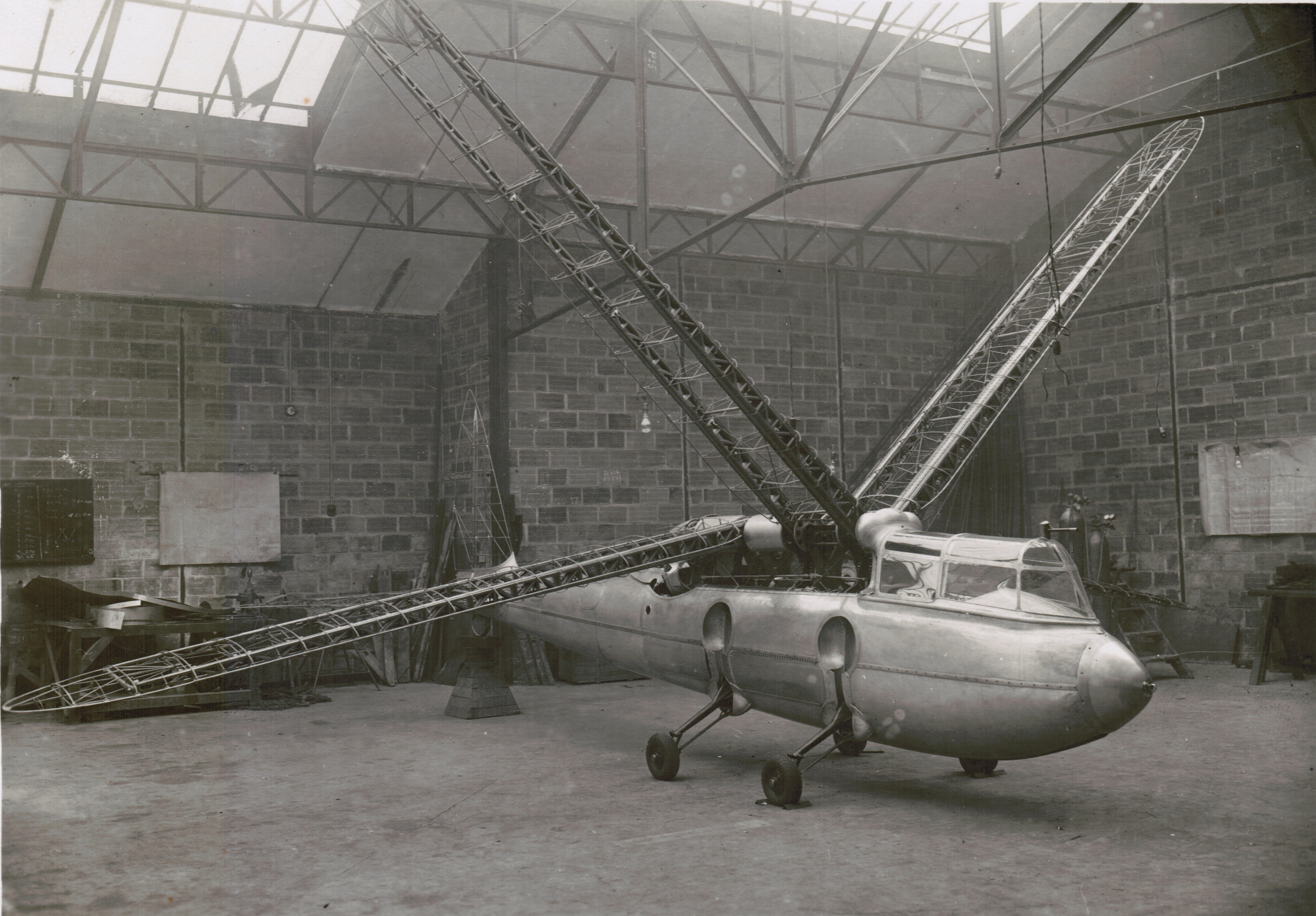
- Riout 102T Alérion, France 1937

General information
- Type: Experimental ornithopter
- National origin: France
- Designer: René Riout
- Number built: 1

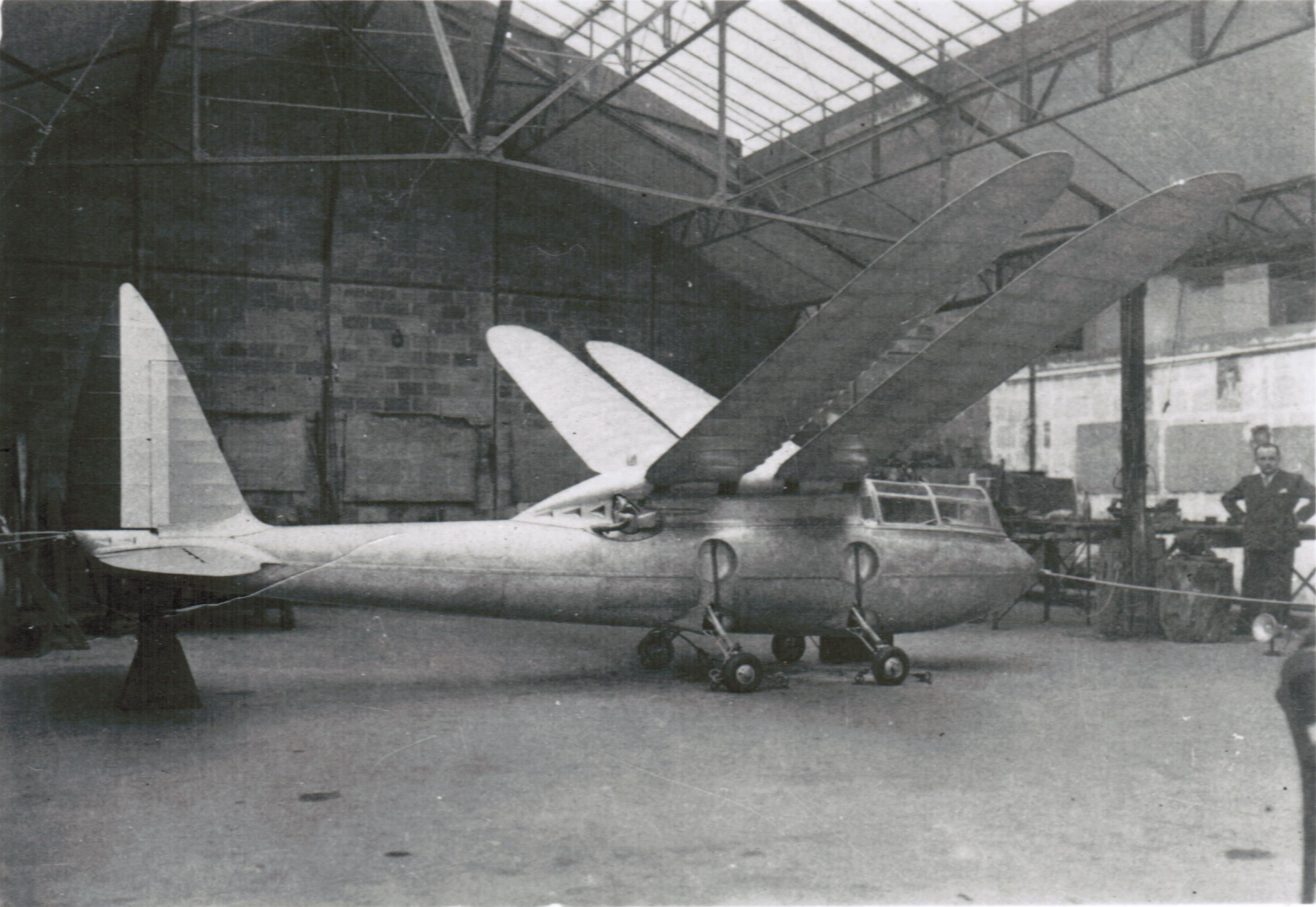
Side view of The Riout 102T Alérion with covered wings

The Riout 102T Alérion is an ornithopter built in 1937 designed by René Riout. The Alérion went through a series of ground tests including in the Chalais-Meudon wind tunnel 1938 when the wings suffered a structural failure. Further development was abandoned with the start of World War II. It never flew and was stored until it was found in 2005 and brought to the Musée Régional de l'Air at Angers, where it was partially restored.

== Literature ==
- Ravel, Christian (2006). "Avion à ailes battantes Riout 102T". Trait d'Union (in French). 225: 1–3.
