= Pirelli Internetional Award =

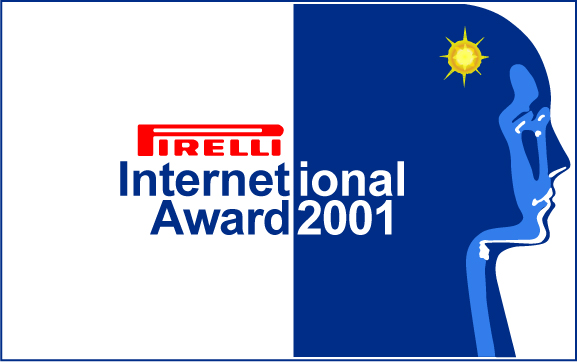

The Pirelli Internetional Award was an international multimedia competition for the communication of science & technology conducted entirely on the internet, which was awarded from 1997 to 2007. Awards were granted to the best multimedia presentations focussing on themes involving the diffusion of science and technology. The multimedia presentations must deal with either physics, chemistry, mathematics, life sciences, or the enabling information and communication technologies that empower multimedia itself. According to Marco Tronchetti Provera, President of the Pirelli Group, the award was established in the belief that the diffusion of social, economic and technological advances are as important as their discovery.

== Judging ==
An international jury of notable people including Nobel Prize laureates reviewed the top entries. With an overall budget prize of 105,000 euro (about US$ 130,000), awards were granted in the following major categories: physics, chemistry, mathematics, life sciences, and information and communications technology.

== Award categories ==
Physics: This category rewarded the best multimedia works coming from the field of physics and amounted to an award of 15,000 euro.

Chemistry: This category rewarded the best multimedia works coming from the field of chemistry and amounted to an award of 15,000 euro.

Mathematics: This category rewarded the best multimedia work coming from the field of mathematics and amounted to an award of 15,000 euro.

Life Sciences:This category rewarded the best multimedia work coming from the field of life sciences and amounted to an award of 15,000 euro.

Information and Communications Technology: This special category prize rewarded those multimedia works which represented a relevant contribution to Information and Communications Technology by means of a product, process, or service, and was deemed to be of particular significance to the jury in that the Pirelli Internetional Award was predicated in large degree to contributions such as these. The Information and Communications Technology prize amounted to 15,000 euro.

Top Pirelli Prize: The Top Pirelli Prize was awarded by the international jury to a multimedia work which best embodied the philosophy of the Pirelli International Award. It amounted to an additional 10,000 euro on top of the monetary award granted in any of the five regular categories. The Top Pirelli Prize was first awarded in 2001 (five years after the inception of the Pirelli Award) to Robert C. Michelson for his work on the Entomopter, a biologically inspired insect-like aerial robot.

== Future ==
In a July 2, 2008 communique, author and manager of the Pirelli Internetional Award, Massimo Armeni, announced that Pirelli would no longer be conducting the award on an annual basis, however no indication was given as to when the next competition for the award would be announced.

== See also ==
- List of engineering awards
- List of computer science awards
