= UTIAS Ornithopter No.1 =

Canadian ornithopter

- UTIAS Ornithopter No.1

General information
- Type: Experimental ornithopter
- Manufacturer: University of Toronto Institute for Aerospace Studies
- Designer: James DeLaurier
- Number built: 1

History
- First flight: 8 July 2006

The UTIAS Ornithopter No.1 (registration C-GPTR) is an ornithopter that was built in Canada in the late 1990s. On 8 July 2006, it took off under its own power, assisted by a turbine jet engine, making a flight of around 300 metres that lasted 14 seconds, after which it crashed.

== Specifications ==
General characteristics

- Crew: One pilot
- Length: 7.47 m (24 ft 6 in)
- Wingspan: 12.56 m (41 ft 2 in)
- Gross weight: 322 kg (710 lb)
- Powerplant: 1 × König SC-430 , 18 kW (24 hp)

Performance

- Cruise speed: 82 km/h (51 mph, 44 kn)

== See also ==
- UTIAS Snowbird
