= International Aerial Robotics Competition =

University-based robotics competition

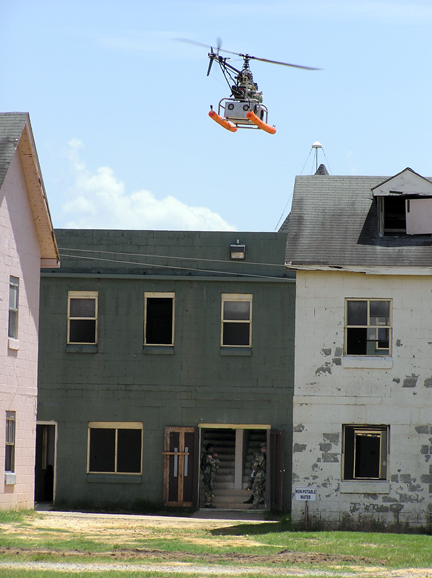
Virginia Polytechnic Institute's aerial robot autonomously inspects the target building before launching a subvehicle through a window in 2007.

The International Aerial Robotics Competition (IARC) is a university-based robotics competition held on the campus of the Georgia Institute of Technology, currently hosted by RoboNation. Since 1991, collegiate teams with the backing of industry and government have fielded autonomous flying robots in an attempt to perform missions requiring robotic behaviors not previously exhibited by a flying machine. The term “aerial robotics” was coined by competition creator Robert Michelson in 1990 to describe a new class of small highly intelligent flying machines. Successive years of competition saw these aerial robots grow from vehicles that could barely maintain themselves in the air, to automatons which are self-stable, self-navigating, and able to interact with their environment.

The goal of the competition has been to provide a reason for the state-of-the-art of aerial robotics to move forward. Challenges have been geared towards producing advances. From 1991 through 2009, six missions were proposed. Each involved fully autonomous robotic behavior undemonstrated at the time. In October 2013 a seventh mission was proposed. It was the first to involve interaction between aerial robots and multiple ground robots. In 2016, the competition and its creator were recognized during the Georgia legislative session in the form of a senate resolution as the longest running aerial robotics competition in the world.

== History ==
=== First mission ===
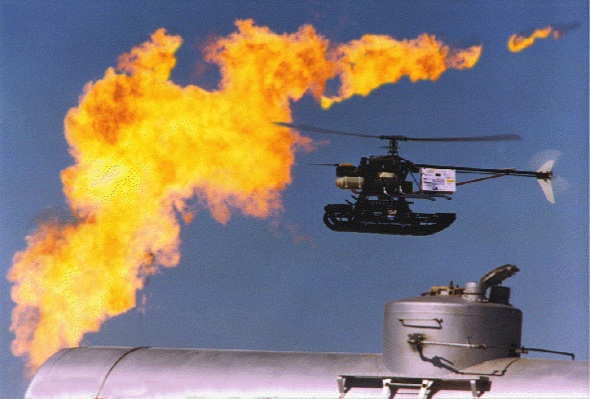
Third mission Southern Polytechnic State University helicopter-based aerial robot flying near fire hazard

The initial mission to move a metallic disc from one side of an arena to the other was seen by many as almost impossible. The college teams improved their entries over the next two years when the competition saw its first autonomous takeoff, flight, and landing by a team from the Georgia Institute of Technology. In 1995, a team from Stanford University was able to acquire a single disk and move it from one side of the arena to the other in a fully autonomous flight—half.

=== Second mission ===
The competition mission was toughened and made less abstract by requiring teams to search for a toxic waste dump, map the location of partially buried randomly oriented toxic waste drums, identify the contents of each drum from the hazard labels on the outside of each drum, and bring a sample back from one of the drums. In 1996, a team from the Massachusetts Institute of Technology and Boston University, with backing from Draper Labs, created a small fully autonomous flying robot that repeatedly and correctly mapped the location of all five of the toxic waste drums, and correctly identified the contents of two from the air, completing approximately seventy five percent of the mission. The following year, an aerial robot developed by a team from Carnegie Mellon University completed the entire mission.

=== Third mission ===
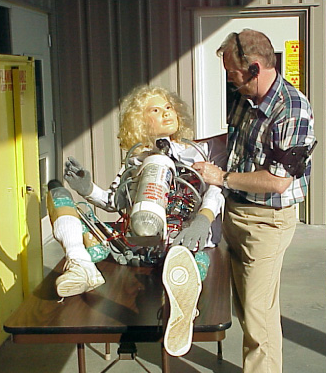
Third mission autonomous pneumatic animatron designed by Prof. Michelson

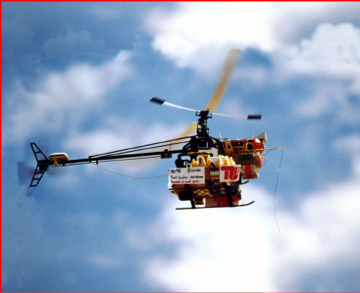
TU-Berlin helicopter-based aerial robot—winner of third mission in 2000

The third mission began in 1998. It was a search and rescue mission requiring fully autonomous robots to take off, fly to a disaster area and search amid fires, broken water mains, clouds of toxic gas, and rubble. The scenario was recreated at the U.S. Department of Energy's Hazardous Material Management and Emergency Response (HAMMER) training facility. Because of the realism of the scenario, animatrons were used instead of human actors to simulate survivors incapable of extracting themselves from the disaster area. MARVIN, an aerial robot developed at Germany's Technische Universität Berlin under Günter Hommel, was able to detect and avoid all of the obstacles, identify all the dead on the ground and the survivors (distinguishing between the two based on movement), and relay pictures of the survivors along with their locations back to first responders who would attempt a rescue. This mission was completed in 2000.

=== Fourth mission ===
The fourth mission was initiated in 2001. It involved three scenarios requiring the same autonomous behavior: a hostage rescue mission where a submarine 3 kilometers off the coast must send an aerial robot to find a coastal city, identify the embassy where hostages are being held, locate valid openings in the embassy building, enter (or send in a sensor probe/subvehicle) and relay pictures of the hostages 3 km to the submarine prior to mounting an amphibious assault on the embassy to free the hostages; the discovery of an ancient mausoleum where a virus had killed the archaeological team, who had radioed that an important and undocumented tapestry was hanging inside, with 15 minutes to send an autonomous aerial robot to find the mausoleum, enter it (or send in a sensor probe/subvehicle) and relay pictures of the tapestry back prior to the destruction of the mausoleum and its contents; and an explosion at a nuclear reactor facility where scientists must send in an aerial robot to find the operating reactor building, enter the building (or send in a sensor probe/subvehicle) and relay pictures of the control panels to determine if a melt-down is imminent.

All three missions involved the same elements of ingress, locating, identification, entry, and relaying pictures within 15 minutes. It was conducted at the U.S. Army's Fort Benning Soldier Battle Lab using the McKenna MOUT (Military Operations on Urban Terrain) site. The fourth mission was completed in 2008 with 27 teams who had demonstrated each of the required aerial robotic behaviors, except being able to demonstrate these behaviors in under 15 minutes—a feat considered by the judges to be inevitable given more time, and therefore no longer a significant challenge. Thus the fourth mission was terminated, $80,000 in awards distributed, and the fifth mission established.

=== Fifth mission ===
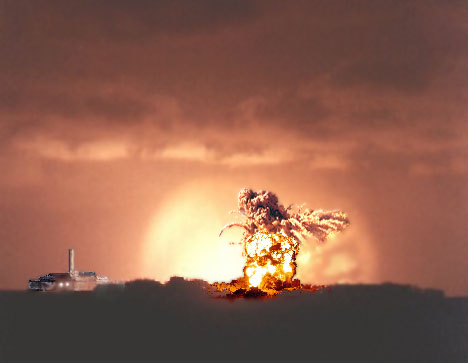
Fourth/fifth mission nuclear reactor complex explosion scenario

The fifth mission picked up where the fourth mission left off by demonstrating the fully autonomous aerial robotic behaviors necessary to rapidly negotiate the confined internal spaces of a structure once it has been penetrated by an air vehicle. The nuclear reactor complex explosion scenario of the fourth mission was used as the backdrop for the fifth mission. The fifth mission required a fully autonomous aerial vehicle to penetrate the structure and negotiate the more complex interior space containing hallways, small rooms, obstacles, and dead ends in order to search for a designated target without the aid of global-positioning navigational aids, and relay pictures back to a monitoring station some distance from the structure. The First Symposium on Indoor Flight Issues was held in conjunction with this 2009 IARC event.

=== Sixth mission ===
The sixth mission began in 2010 as an extension of the fifth mission theme of autonomous indoor flight behavior, however it demanded more advanced behaviors than were possible by any aerial robot extant in 2010. This espionage mission involved covertly stealing a flash drive from a particular room in a building and depositing an identical drive to avoid detection of the theft. The 2010 Symposium on Indoor Flight Issues was held concurrently at the University of Puerto Rico - Mayagüez during the 20th anniversary competition.

=== Seventh mission ===
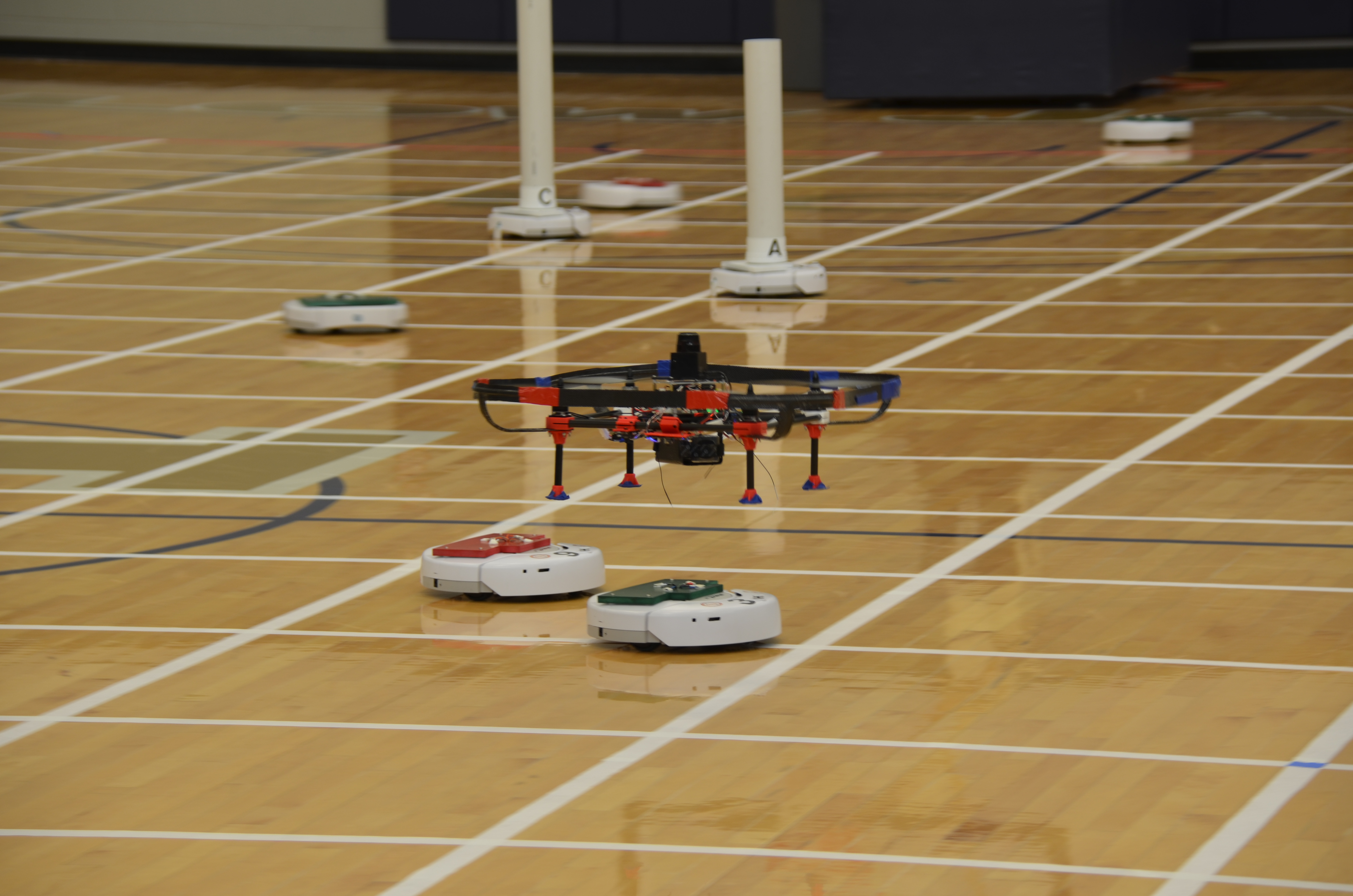
University of Michigan mission 7a aerial robot at the 2014 American Venue

The seventh mission began in 2014 demanding more advanced behaviors than were possible by any aerial robot extant in 2014. A single autonomous aerial robot had to herd up to 10 autonomous ground robot targets across one designated end of a 20m x 20m (65.62 feet x 65.62 feet) arena in under 10 minutes. The arena had neither walls for SLAM mapping nor GPS availability. Techniques such as optical flow or optical odometry were possible solutions to navigation within the arena. Collisions with obstacle ground robots ended the run with no score. The autonomous aerial robots interacted with the ground robots in the following way: if an aerial robot touched the ground robot on top, the ground robot would turn clockwise 45°. If the aerial robot blocked its forward motion by landing in front of it, the ground robot would reverse direction. Ground robots that feely escaped the arena, counted against the aerial robot's overall score, so the autonomous aerial robots had to decide which ground robots were in imminent danger of crossing any boundary except the designated one, and redirect them toward the designated boundary.Zhejiang University was the overall winner of Mission 7, of 52 teams from 12 nations entered as competitors.

=== Eighth mission ===
IARC mission 8 scenario

In 2018, the 8th mission was announced. Mission 8 focused on non-electronic human-machine interaction for the first time, with four aerial robots assisting humans to complete tasks that one person could not independently accomplish. The gist of mission 8 involved a swarm of autonomous aerial robots working with a human to achieve a task in the presence of hostile "Sentry aerial robots" which were trying to impede the human.

In 2018, the inaugural year of mission 8, the American Venue was held on the campus of the Georgia Institute of Technology in Atlanta, Georgia, and the Asia/Pacific Venue was conducted at Beihang University in Beijing China. The following year, Mission 8 was successfully completed in Kunming China at the Yunnan Innovation Institute of Beihang University in under 8 minutes by three teams. Of those, Nanjing University of Aeronautics and Astronautics (NUAA) was able to complete the mission in the fastest completion time. Completing the mission within 10 seconds of NUAA was Sun Yat Sen University. Harbin Institute also completed the mission, with 12 seconds remaining on the clock. NUAA won the grand prize of $10,000.

=== Ninth mission ===
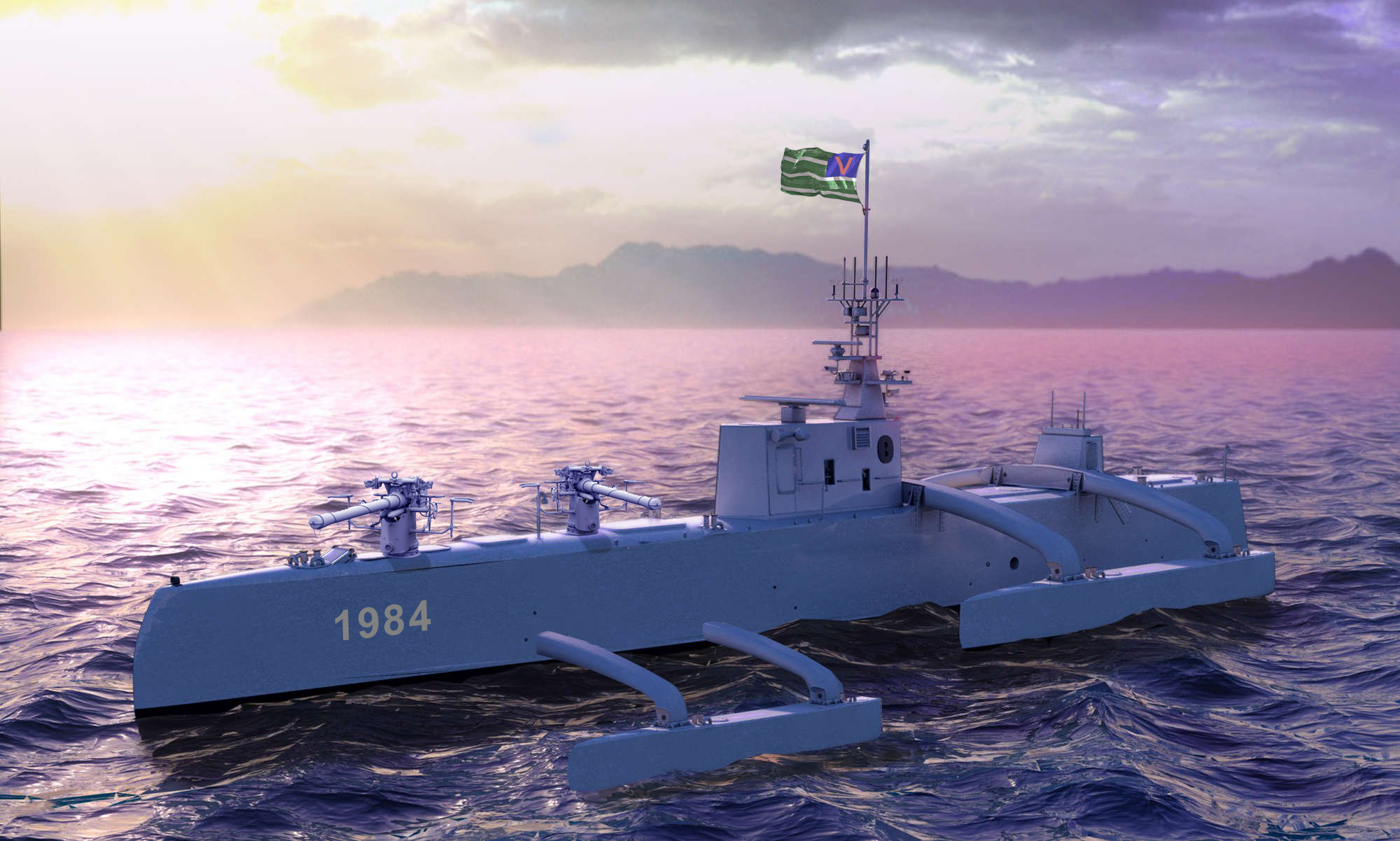
IARC mission 9 scenario

In 2023, the 9th mission was concluded. Mission 9 focused on fully autonomous flight using only onboard computing while avoiding obstacles and other aerial robots over a 3 km route, to replace a 2 kg (4.4 pound), approximately 1m (39 inch) long communications module on the mast of a moving platform (a boat in Sea State 3) and return home in under 9 minutes. Twelve registered teams from four different nations attempted to conduct the mission at their home universities, necessitated by COVID travel restrictions. The team putting forth the best performance was from the Norwegian University of Science and Technology (NTNU). This team demonstrated all of the required behaviors called out in the mission 9 official rules on several authenticated runs, but on its final scoring run, suffered a failure of equipment that had been demonstrated successfully on prior runs. In the end, however, the aggregate performance was judged to qualify the team as the overall winner.

=== Tenth mission ===
Mission 10 of the International Aerial Robotics Competition was announced at the beginning of 2025. The mission focuses on the direction of a swarm of small autonomous aerial vehicles (1 pound weight category) by a human, using only gestures or voice commands (no control station). The swarm will be released by a human attempting to cross a 100 meter mine field in under 10 minutes. The swarm of small autonomous aerial vehicles capable of obstacle avoidance and simultaneous flight coordination will detect and map the location of simulated anti-personnel mines in real time while calculating and communicating a safe path for the human through the minefield. The focus of Mission 10 is autonomous aerial coordination, mapping, communication, and speed rather than detection technologies (e.g., ground-penetrating radar, magnetic, hyperspectral imaging, or acoustic/seismic techniques). The simulated mines will be detectable by pre-defined active and passive infrared signatures. The venue for the 10th IARC mission is the UAS & Counter-UAS Center of Excellence Test Range near Huntsville, Alabama, U.S.A.

== Participants ==
Collegiate teams participating in the IARC have come primarily from the United States and the People's Republic of China, but also from Germany, England, Switzerland, Norway, Spain, Canada, Chile, Qatar, Iran, and India. Teams range in size from several students, up to twenty or more. Both undergraduate and graduate students populate the teams, but some teams have been composed entirely of undergraduates or postgraduates. Industry is not permitted to enter, but it may assist the student teams with funding and equipment.

== Aerial robots ==
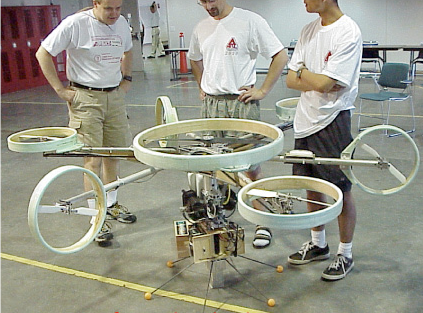
Unconventional aerial robotic flying machine from the University of British Columbia

The aerial robots vary in design from fixed wing airplanes, to conventional helicopters, to ducted fans, to airships, and beyond to bizarre hybrid creations. Because the competition focuses on fully autonomous behavior, the air vehicle itself is of less importance.

Aerial robots must be unmanned and autonomous, and must compete based on their ability to sense the semi-structured environment of the competition arena. They may be intelligent or preprogrammed, but for most of the missions, they could not be controlled by a remote human operator. Size or weight constraints are normally placed on the aerial robots, which must be equipped with a method of manually activated remote override of the primary propulsion system. Mission 8 was an exception in that it allowed a human operator to control four autonomous aerial vehicles by means of hand gestures or spoken commands.

== Prizes ==
IARC prizes have traditionally been "winner take all", although during the competition's early years monetary progress awards were given to further development of the best performers. The third mission took three years to complete with Technische Universitaet Berlin ultimately winning $30,000. With the fourth mission it was realized that there would be no quick winners, and that several years of development would be required by each of the teams. Therefore, an incremental "growing prize pot" was established, to which the Association for Unmanned Vehicle Systems International Foundation added another US$10,000 each year. The 2008 prize level was set at a total of $80,000. Any team completing the fourth mission in under 15 minutes would receive the entire $80,000 prize, otherwise the prize would be distributed based on 2008 competitor performance most closely approaching the 15-minute mission goal. By 2008, Levels 1 through 3 of the fourth mission had been demonstrated, proving that all required aerial robotic behaviors were possible, but by the end of the 2008 event, no single team was able to sequentially and seamlessly demonstrate all behaviors in under 15 minutes. The $80,000 was therefore divided between the ten finalists: (Georgia Institute of Technology received $27,700; Virginia Polytechnic Institute & State University $17,700; and Embry Riddle/DeVry Calgary $12,200, with the remainder shared between the other finalists based on merit). $10,000 was awarded to a team from the Massachusetts Institute of Technology in 2009 for completing Mission 5. In August 2013, a team from Tsinghua University completed the entire sixth mission, thereby winning $40,000. Subsequently Zhejiang University won $20,000 in 2018 for completing Mission 7, and Nanjing University of Aeronautics and Astronautics was awarded $10.000 for completing Mission 8. Mission 9 was completed by the Norwegian University of Science and Technology and was awarded $10,000 in 2023 for the best performance against a field of twelve international teams coming from the United States, China, and India.

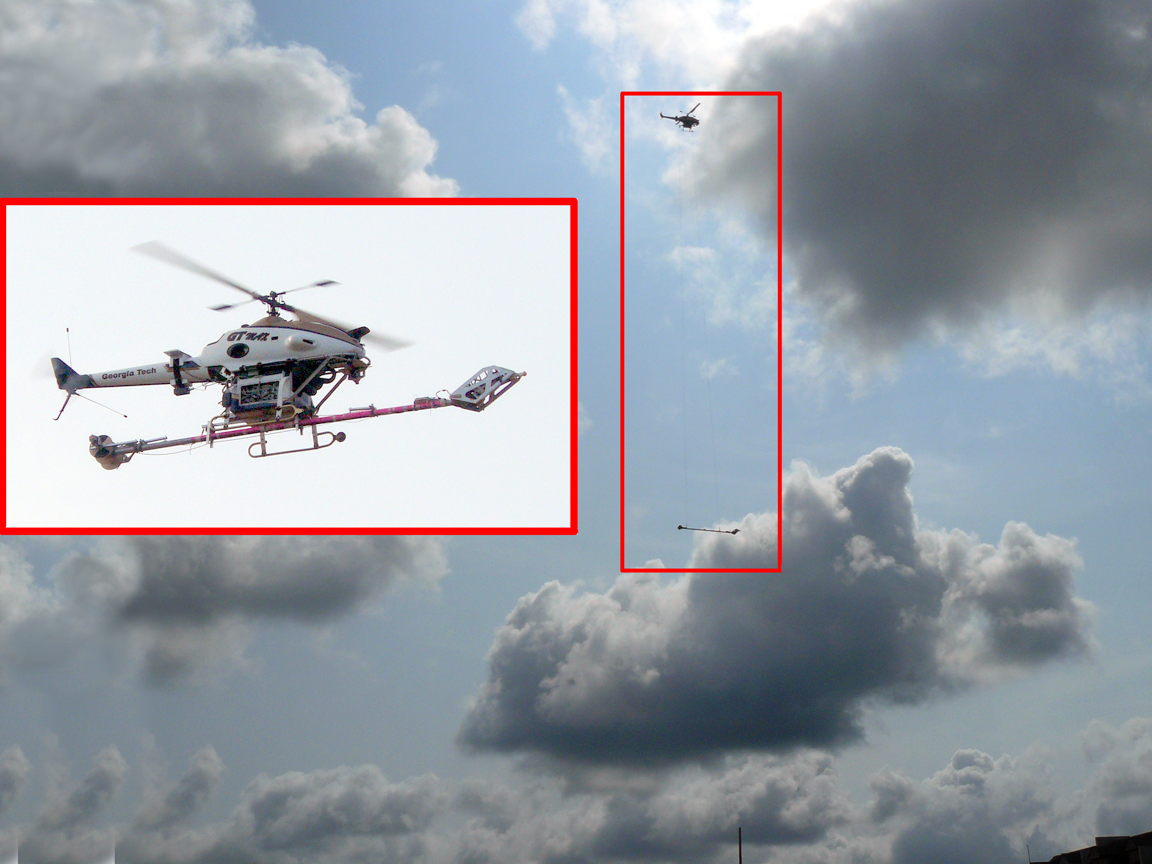
Fourth mission $27,700 prize recipient GTMax aerial robot carrying sub-vehicle deployment boom (inset) and GTMax approaching McKenna MOUT Site with 90-foot boom sling load deployed

== Spin offs ==
The competition creator, Robert Michelson, is past President of the Association for Unmanned Vehicle Systems International (AUVSI). The IARC was first established with seed money for logistics and a grand prize that was backed by the Association. After the initial success and tremendous media attention garnered by the IARC, the AUVSI launched the Intelligent Ground Vehicle Competition a few years later in Detroit, MI. This was organized by AUVSI Board member, Jerry Lane who worked at the U.S. Army Tank Automotive Command at the time. In 1998, the underwater community was represented when AUVSI and the U.S. Office of Naval Research teamed up to offer the first International Autonomous Underwater Vehicle Competition which is held annually in the U.S. All of these competitions, land, sea, and air, have at their core, "full autonomy" as a distinctive characteristic. The Association for Unmanned Vehicle Systems International Foundation (rebranded in 2009 as “RoboNation”) continues to support these competitions with logistics and prize money although there are numerous industry co-sponsors as well.

== Selected IARC reports and publications ==
1. Michelson, R.C., “Autonomous Aerial Robots,” Unmanned Systems, Volume 29 - No. 10, October 2011, Association for Unmanned Vehicle Systems International, Washington, D.C., pp 38–42
2. Howe, J., Vogl, M., Banik, J., et al., "Design and Development of South Dakota School of Mines and Technology’s Aerial Robotic Reconnaissance System", 1994 Proceedings of the AUVSI.
3. Chapuis, J., Eck, C., Geering, H.P., Mudra, R., "The Swiss Entry into the 1996 International Aerial Robotics Competition," 1996 Proceedings of the AUVSI, July 1996, Orlando, FL, pp. 947–953
4. Padgett, W.T.,"Teaching design through design competition," Frontiers in Education Conference- Teaching and Learning in an Era of Chang, 27th Annual Conference Proceedings, 5–8 November 1997, Vol.3, pp. 1477–1480
5. Koo, T.J., Shim, D.H., Shakernia, O., Sinopoli, B., Ma, Y., Hoffman, F., Sastry, S., "Hierarchical Hybrid System Design on Berkeley Unmanned Autonomous Aerial Vehicle," 1998 Proceedings of the AUVSI, July 1998
6. Greer, D., McKerrow, P., Abrantes, J., "Robots in Urban Search and Rescue Operations," Proceedings of the 2002 Australasian Conference on Automation, Auckland, Australian Robotics and Automation Association, 27–29 November 2002, pp. 25–30
7. Proctor, A.A., Kannan, S.K., Raabe, C., Christophersen, H.B., and Johnson, E.N., “Development of an Autonomous Aerial Reconnaissance System at Georgia Tech,” Proceedings of the Association for Unmanned Vehicle Systems International Unmanned Systems Symposium & Exhibition, 2003.
