= Robert C. Michelson =

American academic (born 1951)

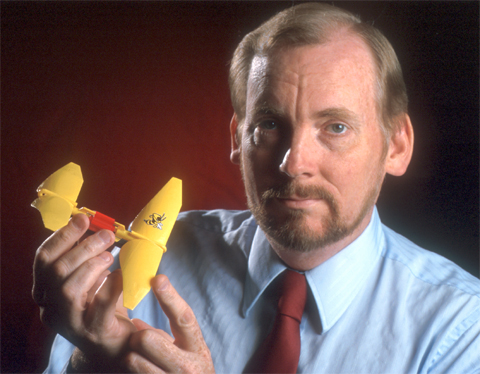
- Michelson holding his invention: the Entomopter
- Born: Washington, D.C.
- Known for: Aerial robotics systems Micro air vehicles Biologically-inspired robotics Robotics competitions
- Awards: AUVSI Pioneer Award (1998); Pirelli Internetional Award (2001)
- Scientific career
- Fields: Robotics; Electronics engineering Aerospace engineering
- Workplaces: Georgia Institute of Technology; The Georgia Tech Research Institute; U.S. Naval Research Laboratory

Robert C. Michelson (born 1951) is an American engineer and academic who invented the entomopter, a biologically inspired flapping-winged aerial robot, and who established the International Aerial Robotics Competition. Michelson's career began at the U.S. Naval Research Laboratory. He later became a member of the research faculty at the Georgia Institute of Technology. He is the author of three U.S. patents and over 100 journal papers, book chapters and reports. Michelson is the recipient of the 1998 AUVSI Pioneer Award and the 2001 Pirelli Award for the diffusion of scientific culture as well as the first Top Pirelli Prize.

== Early life and education ==
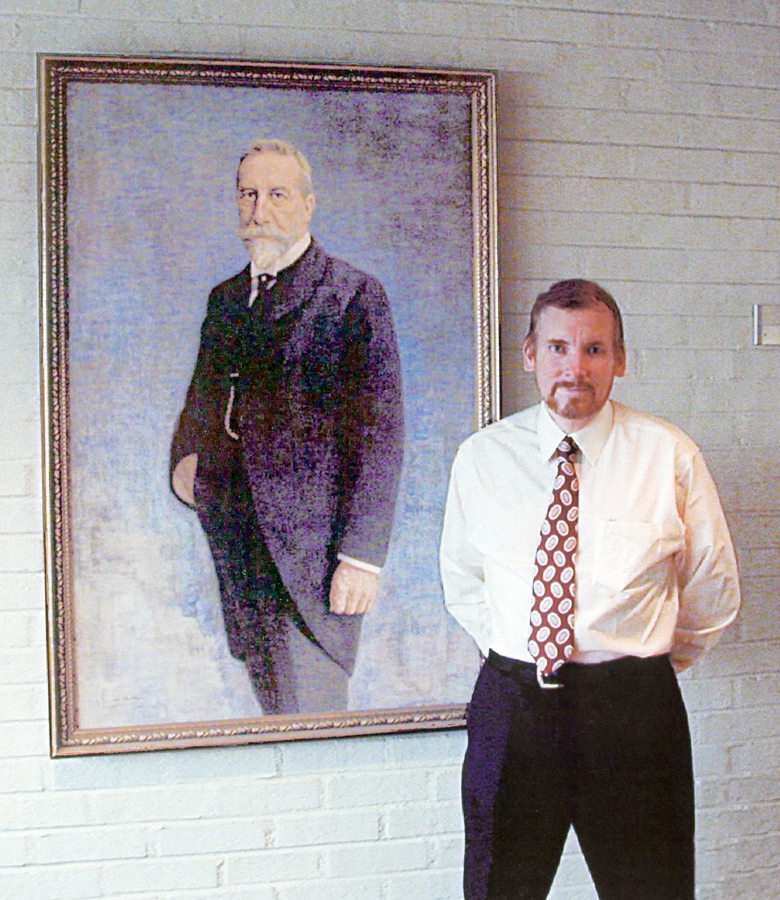
Robert Michelson next to a portrait of relative Christian Michelsen, at the Chr. Michelsen Institute in Bergen Norway.

Michelson was born in 1951 in Washington D.C., the only son of Carroll and Evelyn Michelson, and is related to Christian Michelsen, the first Prime Minister of Norway. Michelson attended the Burgundy Farm Country Day School during the sixth through eighth grades. While at Fort Hunt High School he was President of the Fort Hunt Amateur Rocket Club which built large (2m x 5 cm) instrumented solid fuel rockets that were launched at the Camp Pickett artillery range in Blackstone, Virginia. He graduated from Virginia Polytechnic Institute and State University in 1973 and the Georgia Institute of Technology in 1974 with degrees in Electrical Engineering.

== Career ==
From 1971 to 1973, Michelson was a research engineer working on aerospace radar systems at the U.S. Naval Research Laboratory in Washington D.C. He then moved to the Georgia Tech Research Institute in Atlanta, Georgia. During the 1970s and 1980s Michelson primarily developed radar signal processing and control hardware, but was also interested in the automation of remote sensing systems ranging from the tracking of endangered species to the creation of realistic soldier training scenarios and simulation and testing of foreign military radar assets. In the late 1980s he became Head of the Georgia Tech Research Institute's Technology Development Division and his interests turned to unmanned aerial vehicle systems as a fusion of autonomy, information technology, and aeronautics. In particular, "aerial robotics" (a term he coined in 1990 to represent the infusion of cognition into unmanned aerial vehicles) dominated his research for the next two decades.

Since the mid-1990s, Michelson's work has concentrated on biologically inspired micro air vehicle design. From 1997 through 2004, Michelson was adjunct associate professor to the School of Aerospace Engineering, teaching classes in avionics for unmanned aerial vehicles (UAVs) and Micro/Mini Air Vehicle (MAV) design. Michelson retired from the Georgia Tech Research Institute in 2004 and currently holds the title of Principal Research Engineer Emeritus with the institute. In 2004, he created Millennial Vision, LLC to continue research into biologically inspired aerial robots and remote sensing. He is the President of SEPDAC (Scientific Enterprise in Pursuit and Discovery of Ancient Cultures), a nonprofit educational and scientific organization.

Michelson was the U.S. representative and deputy chief referee to the Aviation Industry Corporation of China's UAV Grand Prix during its inaugural year (2011), and again in 2013 and 2015. He was the section editor for "MAVs and Bio-Inspired UAVs" in Springer's Handbook of Unmanned Aerial Vehicles, released in 2014. Michelson was chosen to represent the United States on the NATO Advisory Group for Aerospace Research and Development (AGARD) to predict future (2020 timeframe) sensor technologies for unmanned aerial systems (UAS). He was the NATO/RTA (Research and Technology Agency) lecturer at the Turkish Air Force Academy (Hava Harp Okulu) in Istanbul in 2006, and invited lecturer on Micro Air Vehicle technology at the von Karman Institute for Fluid Dynamics in 1999 and 2003. He was the first "MITRE Technology Speaker"(1998) and has been a visiting technology professor in Australia, Belgium, Norway, Sweden, Turkey and Mexico.

Michelson was a consultant to the U.S. Army and the Indian Ministry of Defence in 2008, responsible for defining and organizing the 1st U.S.-Asian Micro Air Vehicle Demonstration in Agra India. He performed similar duties for the U.S. Army in defining the 1st US-European Micro Air Vehicle Competition/Demonstration in Garmisch Germany in 2005. He is creator and organizer of the annual International Aerial Robotics Competition.

=== Projects ===
While at the U.S. Naval Research Laboratory, Michelson worked on radar-based ocean surveillance systems and flew hardware test missions on a Lockheed Warning Star PO-1W Super Constellation. In 1974 Michelson began work at the Georgia Tech Research Institute, where he got his first contract when an entry-level engineer (Research Engineer I). This first project involved methods to electronically track the endangered species Trichechus manatus (West Indian manatee) in the waters around the Kennedy Space Center.

In 1979, Michelson directed the Army's Indirect Fire Simulation effort conducted for Combat Development and Experimentation Command (CDEC). Michelson directed a Defense Advanced Research Projects Agency (DARPA) program to show feasibility of a non-line-of-sight radio-acoustic sensor for bending radar signals using the Bragg principle to detect obstacle-masked targets (essentially making radars look around corners). He also directed a program to evaluate ground penetration radar for detection of buried natural gas leaks in urban utility systems. During 1981, Michelson directed a program for the automated noninvasive testing of captured foreign threat assets. Other radar test devices were also developed by Michelson for U.S. military test and evaluation purposes within the United States, including a program to develop a Ka-band Linear Electronics Countermeasure Source (KABLES) for use in testing U.S. Army millimeter wave assets.

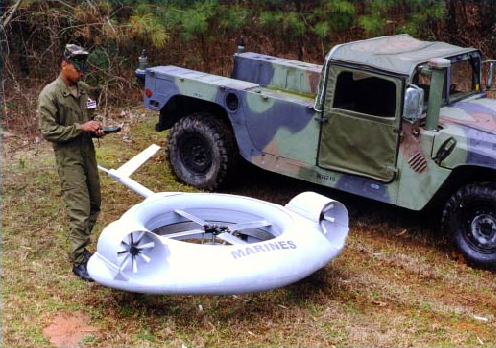
Compound ducted fan developed by Michelson's UAV team at GTRI began as a traffic surveillance drone program.

During the mid-1990s, Michelson's research began to focus almost entirely on unmanned vehicle systems, especially those with the power of flight. Under various contracts to DARPA and the Air Force, and using internal research and development funds from the Georgia Tech Research Institute, his design team designed a micro air vehicle (MAV) known as the entomopter. The NASA Institute for Advanced Concepts recognized the unique flight qualities of the entomopter and awarded Michelson two contracts to explore the feasibility of the entomopter for slow flight in Mars' lower atmosphere.

== Honors and awards ==
Michelson is an Associate Fellow of the American Institute of Aeronautics and Astronautics (AIAA), Senior Member of the Institute of Electrical and Electronics Engineers (IEEE), and a Full Member of the Scientific Research Society of North America, Sigma Xi. During the 1990s he served as president and member of the Board of Directors of the Association for Unmanned Vehicle Systems (AUVSI) International organization. In 1998, Michelson received the AUVSI Pioneer Award, which is the highest level of recognition within the unmanned systems industry for technical contributions. Michelson is the recipient of the 2001 Pirelli Award for the diffusion of scientific culture, given by an international jury for the "best multimedia project coming from any educational institution in the world". For endeavors related to the entomopter, he was also awarded the first €25,000 Top Pirelli Prize. In 2016, the International Aerial Robotics Competition and Michelson were recognized during the Georgia legislative session in the form of "Senate Resolution 1255” which recognized his effort in the development of the longest running aerial robotics competition in the world and moving forward the state of the art in aerial robotics on several occasions.

== Media and literature ==
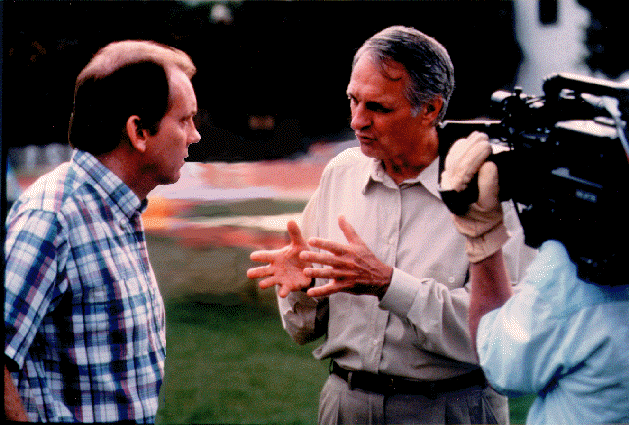
Robert Michelson being interviewed by Alan Alda at the 1995 International Aerial Robotics Competition during the filming of Scientific American Frontiers

Michelson has been interviewed and quoted in Business Week, Popular Mechanics, Scientific American, Chronicle of Higher Education), and radio on National Public Radio, Armed Forces Radio, American Association for the Advancement of Science radio syndicate), Scientific American Frontiers, Discovery Channel, CNN, BBC, and various ABC/CBS/NBC/Fox affiliates).

A technical biography of Michelson is the subject of episode 1008 of the television program Beyond Invention, which chronicles a number of his research projects including UAV research, the International Aerial Robotics Competition, the entomopter-based Mars surveyor, and his work with automated coral propagation. Michelson is featured in an hour-long Discovery Science Channel program entitled ‘’Airbots’’.

Michelson has been quoted in news programming with regard to the International Aerial Robotics Competition and the applications of the underlying technology to military and civilian spheres. As the use of robotic drone aircraft increased during the Gulf Wars, public interest in the subject was peaked and Michelson was featured in the NOVA episode "Spies that Fly" and the BBC special Seven Ways to Topple Saddam. Michelson is the basis for the fictional character Michael C. Robertson in the novel Drone Games (2014) by Joel Narlock. In this work, Michael C. Robertson is the creator of the entomopter at the Georgia Technology Research Institute. This fictitious character's name is an anagram of Robert C. Michelson. Michelson's entomopter is also featured in another of Joel Narlock's novels, Target Acquired (2003).

== Selected publications ==
- “Test and Evaluation for Fully Autonomous Micro Air Vehicles,” The ITEA Journal, December 2008, Volume 29, Number 4, ISSN 1054-0229 International Test and Evaluation Association, pp. 367–374 (winner of the 2009 International Test and Evaluation Association Publication Award)
- “Very small flying machines,” 2006 Yearbook of Science & Technology, McGraw-Hill, New York, ISBN 0-07-146205-8, 2006, pp. 341–344
- “Novel Approaches to Miniature Flight Platforms,” Proceedings of the Institute of Mechanical Engineers, Vol. 218 Part G: Journal of Aerospace Engineering, Special Issue Paper 2004, pp. 363–373
- “Beyond Biologically Inspired Insect Flight,” von Karman Institute for Fluid Dynamics RTO/AVT Lecture Series on Low Reynolds Number Aerodynamics on Aircraft Including Applications in Emerging UAV Technology, Brussels Belgium, 24–28 November 2003
- “The Entomopter,” Neurotechnology for Biomimetic Robots, ISBN 0-262-01193-X, The MIT Press, September 2002, pp. 481–509
- “Autonomous Vehicles,” Proceedings of the IEEE, Vol. 84, No. 8, August 1996, pp. 1147–1164
- “Feasibility of Applying Radio-Acoustic Techniques to Non Line-of-Sight Sensing,” AIAA Journal of Aircraft, Vol. 33, No. 2, March – April 1996, pp. 260–267
- “Tracking of the Florida Manatee,” ISA Transactions, Vol. 21, No. 1, 1982, pp. 79–85
