= AeroVironment Nano Hummingbird =

Tiny remote controlled aircraft built to resemble and fly like a hummingbird

Nano Hummingbird
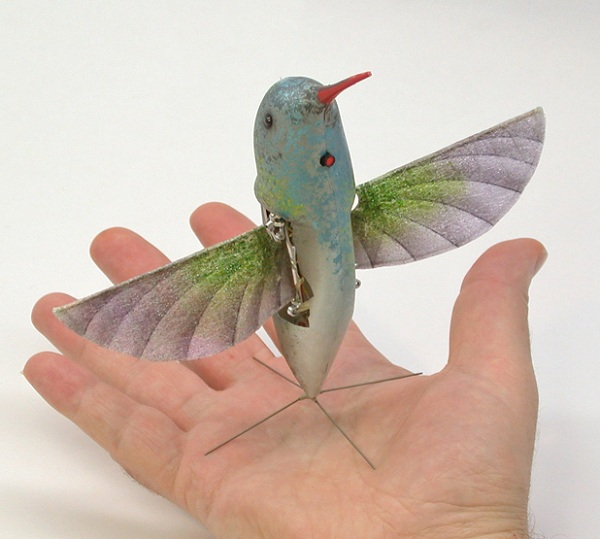
- Artificial hummingbird weighs less than an AA battery

General information
- Type: Experimental UAV
- Manufacturer: AeroVironment
- Primary user: DARPA

The AeroVironment Nano Hummingbird or Nano Air Vehicle (NAV) is a tiny, remote controlled aircraft built to resemble and fly like a hummingbird, developed in the United States by AeroVironment, Inc. to specifications provided by the Defense Advanced Research Projects Agency (DARPA). The Hummingbird is equipped with a small video camera for surveillance and reconnaissance purposes and has a flight endurance of up to 11 minutes. It can fly outdoors, or enter a doorway to investigate indoor environments. It was announced to the public on 17 February 2011.

== Specifications ==
DARPA contributed $4 million to AeroVironment since 2006 to create a prototype "hummingbird-like" aircraft for the Nano Air Vehicle (NAV) program. The result was called the Nano Hummingbird which can fly at 11 miles per hour (18 km/h) and move in three axes of motion. The aircraft can climb and descend vertically; fly sideways left and right; forward and backward; rotate clockwise and counter-clockwise; and hover in mid-air. The artificial hummingbird maneuvers using its flapping wings for propulsion and attitude control. It has a body shaped like a real hummingbird, a wingspan of 6.3 inches (160 mm), and a total flying weight of 0.67 ounces (19 g)—less than an AA battery. This includes the systems required for flight: batteries, motors, and communications systems; as well as the video camera payload.

== Technical goals ==
DARPA established flight test milestones for the Hummingbird to achieve and the finished prototype met all of them, and even exceeded some of these objectives:

- Demonstrate precision hover flight within a virtual two-meter diameter sphere for one minute.
- Demonstrate hover stability in a wind gust flight which required the aircraft to hover and tolerate a two-meter per second (five miles per hour) wind gust from the side, without drifting downwind more than one meter.
- Demonstrate a continuous hover endurance of eight minutes with no external power source.
- Fly and demonstrate controlled, transition flight from hover to 11 miles per hour fast forward flight and back to hover flight.
- Demonstrate flying from outdoors to indoors, and back outdoors through a normal-size doorway.
- Demonstrate flying indoors "heads-down" where the pilot operates the aircraft only looking at the live video image stream from the aircraft, without looking at or hearing the aircraft directly.
- Fly the aircraft in hover and fast forward flight with bird-shaped body and bird-shaped wings.

The device is bigger and heavier than a typical real hummingbird, but is smaller and lighter than the largest hummingbird varieties. It could be deployed to perform reconnaissance and surveillance in urban environments or on battlefields, and might perch on windowsills or power lines, or enter buildings to observe its surroundings, relaying camera views back to its operator. According to DARPA, the Nano Air Vehicle's configuration will "provide the warfighter with unprecedented capability for urban mission operations."
