= Pichancourt =

In 1889; Pichancourt (first name is not known) developed the L'Oiseau Mechanique (Mechanical Bird) which aimed to imitate the motion of a bird's wings in flight.

Mechanical Bird 1889
