= Hybrid Insect Micro-Electro-Mechanical Systems =

United States government project

Hybrid Insect Micro-Electro-Mechanical Systems (HI-MEMS) is a project of DARPA, a unit of the United States Department of Defense. Created in 2006, the unit's goal is the creation of tightly coupled machine-insect interfaces by placing micro-mechanical systems inside the insects during the early stages of metamorphosis. After implantation, the "insect cyborgs" could be controlled by sending electrical impulses to their muscles. The primary application is surveillance. The project was created with the ultimate goal of delivering an insect within 5 meters of a target located 100 meters away from its starting point. In 2008, a team from the University of Michigan demonstrated a cyborg unicorn beetle at an academic conference in Tucson, Arizona. The beetle was able to take off and land, turn left or right, and demonstrate other flight behaviors. Researchers at Cornell University demonstrated the successful implantation of electronic probes into tobacco hornworms in the pupal stage.
