= Entomopter =

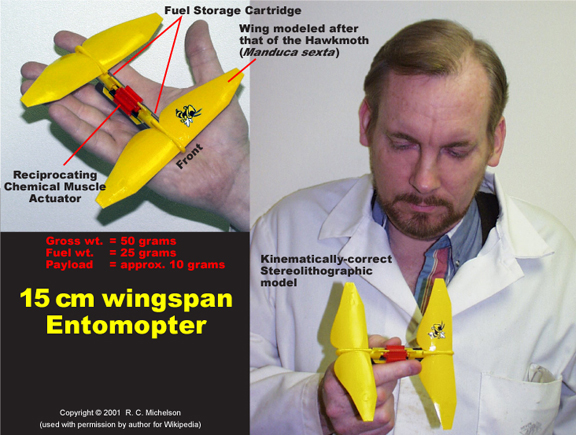
Terrestrial Entomopter model.

An Entomopter is an aircraft that flies using the wing-flapping aerodynamics of an insect. The word is derived from entomo (meaning insect: as in entomology) + pteron (meaning wing). Entomopters are type of ornithopter, which is the broader term for any device intended to fly by flapping wings.

== Terrestrial entomopter ==
The terrestrial Entomopter is a multimode (flying/crawling) insect-like robot developed by Robert C. Michelson and his design team from the Georgia Tech Research Institute (GTRI), University of Cambridge, ETS Labs and others.

The Earth-bound entomopter has a 15 to 18 cm wing span. A twin set of wings situated fore and aft of the RCM provide balanced resonant flapping to create not only lift and thrust, but full vehicle control. Wing flapping occurs a 35 Hz constant rate. This biologically inspired aerial robot is classified as a micro air vehicle (MAV) because of its size. Mission payloads are around 10 grams with a full gross takeoff weight (GTOW) of 50 grams. Intended use is for covert indoor reconnaissance or operation in confined human-inaccessible spaces.

== Mars entomopter ==
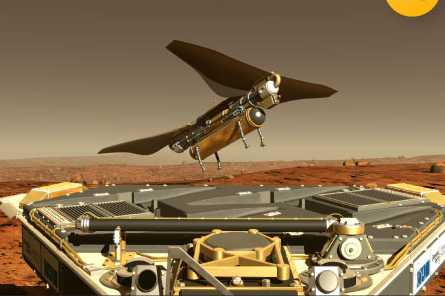
Visualization of entomopter flying on Mars (NASA)

Flight in the atmosphere of Mars is difficult. Aerial Mars rovers using a conventional fixed wing would have to fly at over 250 mph just to stay aloft in the rarefied Mars atmosphere. This makes landing on the rocky surface almost impossible, thereby precluding sample inspection/gathering. Also, the high speed flight means that dwell time on any particular area will be difficult—a negative feature that is compounded by the fact that turns in the thin atmosphere will require enormous radii. An entomopter, on the other hand, can achieve abnormally high lift with rapidly flapping wings (in part due to the "leading edge vortex" phenomenon), and therefore allows the fuselage to move slowly in relation to the ground.

An entomopter team led by Anthony Colozza of the Ohio Aerospace Institute received NASA Institute for Advanced Concepts (NIAC) funding to study an entomopter concept for a potential future robotic Mars missions. They note that the Reynolds number for flight on Mars is equivalent to that found at over 100,000 feet (30 km) on Earth. Nothing currently flies with any regularity at this altitude. However, the Reynolds number regime for the tiny entomopter operating in Earth’s atmosphere is equivalent to a larger version (one-meter wing span) operating in the rarefied Mars atmosphere. In addition, the surface gravity of Mars is only 37% that of Earth, so an entomopter-based Mars Flyer would benefit by proportionately reduced weight, even at its increased size on Mars. An Entomopter-based Mars Flyer holds promise of not only flying slowly over the Martian landscape, but also of serving as a multimode vehicle which could land, take samples, recharge, or communicate, and then take off to continue the survey mission. It even has the potential of returning to its launch point for refueling, downloading of data, or transferring of samples.

More recently, a new NIAC project, "Marsbee," was awarded to continue study of the concept of insect-like flight on Mars.

== Funding and international recognition ==
The Entomopter project received initial internal research and development (IRAD) funding from the Georgia Institute of Technology beginning in 1996, and follow-on funding from the Defense Advanced Research Projects Agency DARPA, the Air Force Research Laboratory (AFRL) and the NASA Institute for Advanced Concepts. For endeavors related to the Entomopter, Michelson is the recipient of the 2001 Pirelli Award for the diffusion of scientific culture given by an international Jury for the “best multimedia project coming from any educational institution in the world.” He was also awarded the first Top Pirelli Prize (€25,000) for the work deemed best from an international field of over 1000 considered.

== See also ==
- Insect flight
- Ornithopter
- Bionics

== Selected reports and publications ==
1. Michelson, R.C., Novel Approaches to Miniature Flight Platforms, Proceedings of the Institute of Mechanical Engineers, Vol. 218 Part G: Journal of Aerospace Engineering, Special Issue Paper 2004, pp. 363–373
2. Michelson, R.C., Naqvi, M.A., Beyond Biologically-Inspired Insect Flight, von Karman Institute for Fluid Dynamics RTO/AVT Lecture Series on Low Reynolds Number Aerodynamics on Aircraft Including Applications in Emerging UAV Technology, Brussels Belgium, 24–28 November 2003
3. Colozza, A., Michelson, R.C., et al., Planetary Exploration Using Biomimetics – An Entomopter for Flight on Mars, Phase II Final Report, NASA Institute for Advanced Concepts Project NAS5-98051, October 2002
4. Michelson, R.C., Scaling of Biologically Inspired Aerial Robots, 5th International Workshop on Similarity Methods, Institut für Statik und Dynamik der Luft und Raumfahrtkonstruktionen, Universität Stuttgart, 4–5 November 2002, pp. 71 – 78
5. Michelson, R.C., Neurotechnology for Biomimetic Robots, ISBN 0-262-01193-X, The MIT Press, September 2002, pp. 481 – 509, (chapter author).
