= Soaring Association of Canada =

Canadian aviation organization

The Soaring Association of Canada (SAC) is the national association for glider pilots in Canada. Founded in 1945, it is a non-profit amateur sports association promoting, enhancing and protecting the sport of soaring in Canada. SAC is an affiliation of the 24 Canadian glider clubs with a total of near 1,000 members. It is a registered charity

Members of Canadian Gliding clubs also have to join the SAC

In association with the host club, it organises championships.

SAC is affiliated with the Aero Club of Canada, the International Gliding Commission and the Fédération Aéronautique Internationale.
