= Soaring Society of South Africa =

SSSA logo

The Soaring Society of South Africa (SSSA) is the body to which all gliding and touring motor gliders in South Africa must belong, as stipulated in law by the South African Civil Aviation Authority (CAA), to pursue the sport of gliding within South Africa. It is affiliated to the Aeroclub of South Africa which also represents all the sporting bodies at the CAA. Membership is by subscription directly to the SSSA.

The SSSA is charged with the following responsibilities:

- Defining and publishing the standards for safe operations (approved by the CAA)
- Maintaining a register of airworthy gliders
- Approving courses for the training of instructors
- Negotiating to ensure access to airspace
- Promoting the sport of gliding
- Liaison with international gliding organisations

Gliding in South Africa is a genuinely varied sport enjoyed at different levels, from the flourishing club scene, to aerobatics, up to international racing championships. Sailplanes come in different styles and sizes but are always graceful in the air.

== See also ==
- Sport in South Africa
