= List of unmanned aerial vehicle applications =

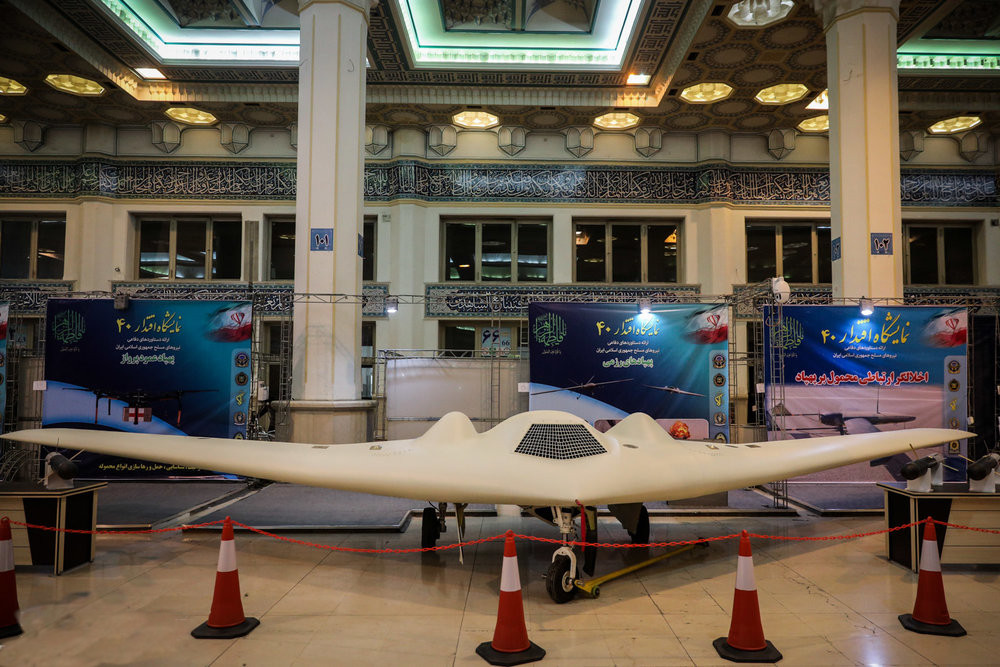
An Iranian jet-powered flying wing type stealth UCAV produced by the Shahed Aviation Industries

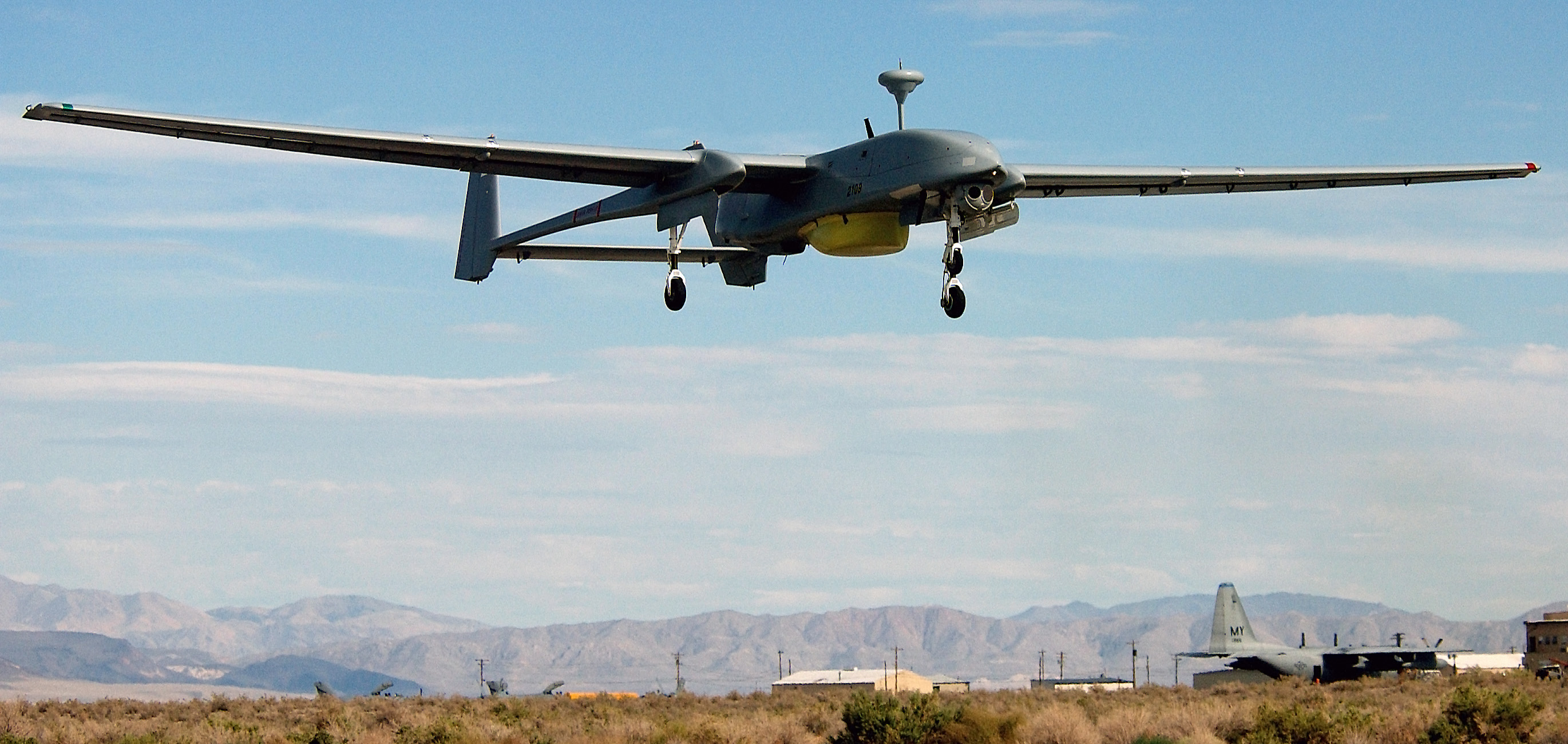
IAI Heron, an unmanned surveillance and reconnaissance aerial vehicle developed by the Malat (UAV) division of Israel Aerospace Industries

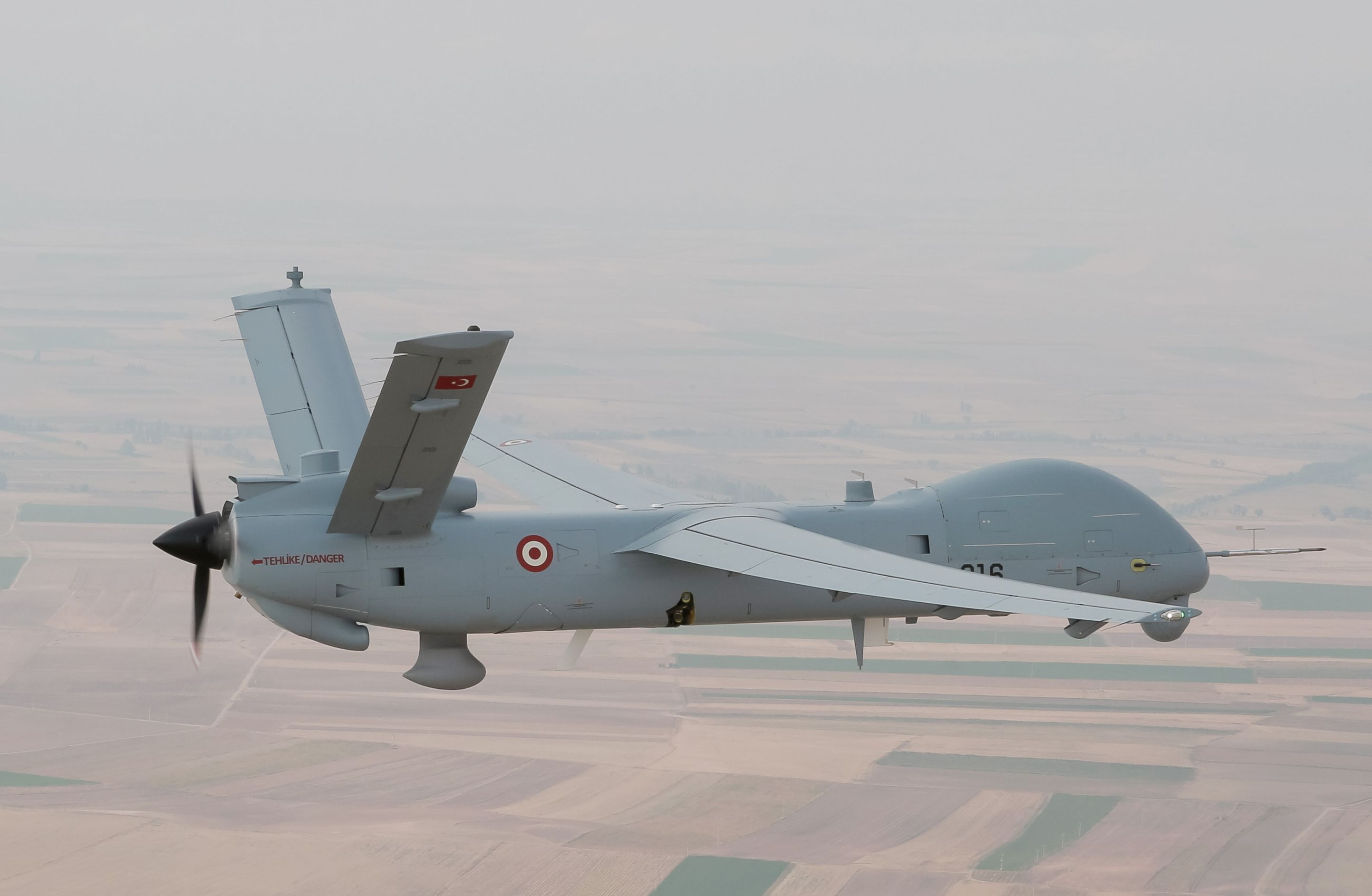
TAU Anka-S is an unmanned combat aerial vehicle developed by Turkish Aerospace Industries for the requirements of the Turkish Armed Forces and export

Unmanned aerial vehicles are used across the world for civilian, commercial, as well as military applications. In fact, Drone Industry Insights (a commercial drone market consultancy in Germany) has identified "237 ways that drones revolutionize business" and released a 151-page report consisting of 237 applications and 37 real-life case studies throughout 15 industries including agriculture, energy, construction, and mining.

The following is an incomplete list of some of those applications.

== Aerospace ==
Airlines and maintenance, repair, and operations contractors use UAVs for aircraft maintenance. In June 2015 EasyJet began testing UAVs in the maintenance of their Airbus A320s and in July 2016 at the Farnborough Airshow, Airbus (manufacturer of the A320), demonstrated the use of UAVs for the visual inspection of an aircraft. However, some aircraft maintenance professionals remain wary of the technology and its ability to properly catch potential dangers.

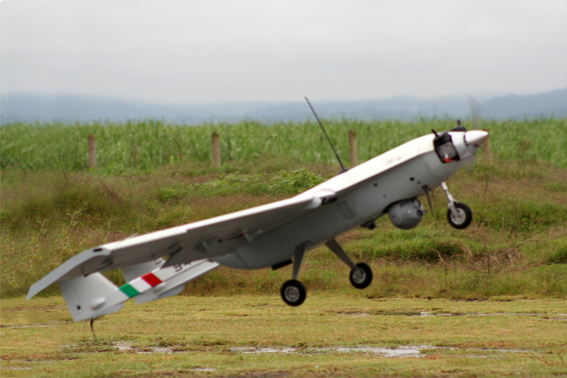
A Hydra Technologies Ehécatl taking-off for a surveillance mission

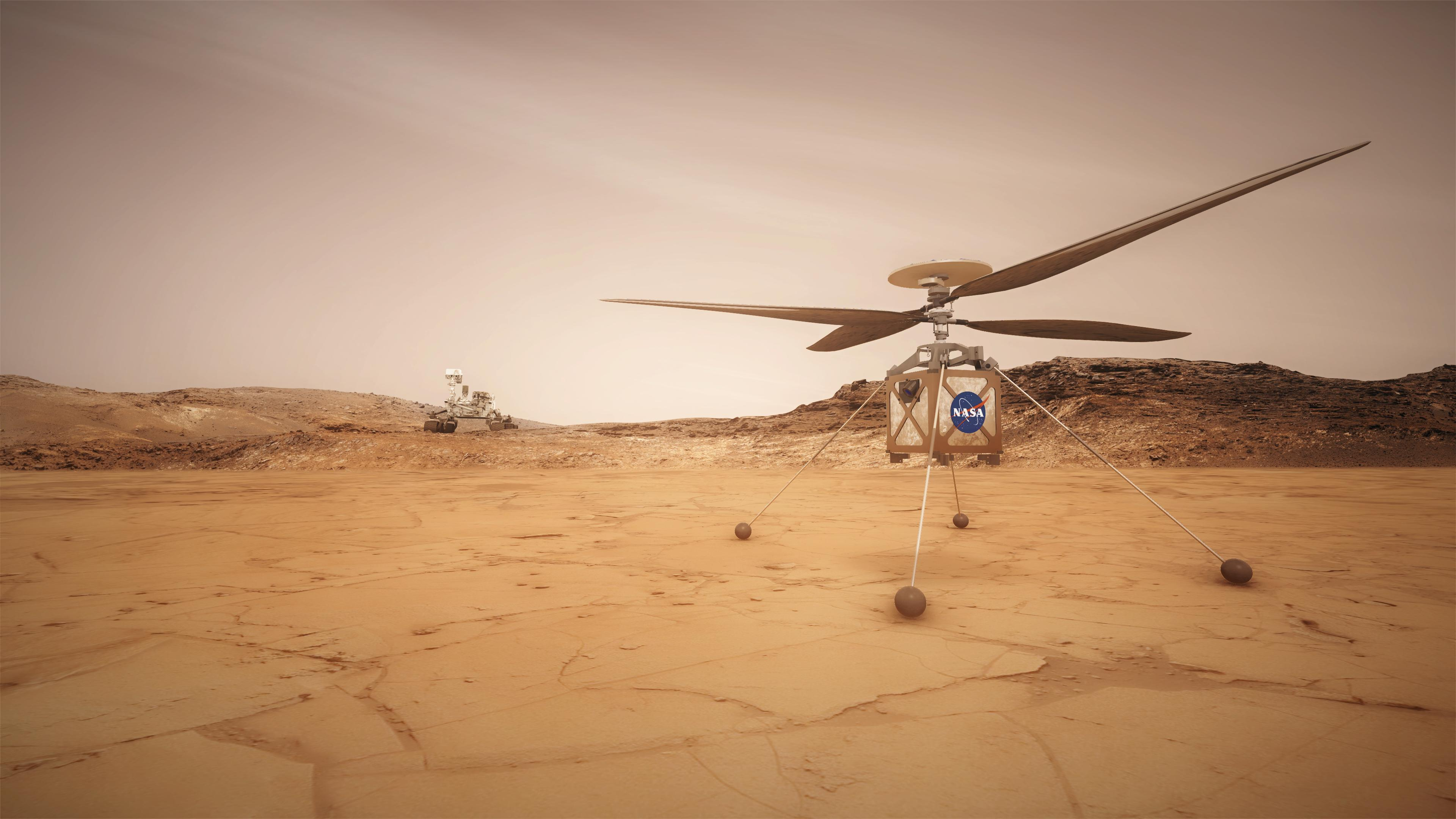
Mars Helicopter Ingenuity

In 2002, a paper was published suggesting autonomous robotic helicopters for Mars exploration, possible for the Mars Scout Program. A number of advantages of a viable rotorcraft design were noted, including the ability to pass over difficult Mars terrain yet still visit multiple sites in situ. The short hop made by Lunar Surveyor 6 in 1967 was noted as example of hopping to visit another site.

A small scout drone, launching from a Mars rover has been in development in the late 2010s, including US$23 million for a helicopter demonstration in 2018. The program for the Mars Helicopter Ingenuity possibly for the Perseverance rover would have a high resolution, downward-looking camera for navigation, landing, and science surveying of the terrain, and a communication system to relay data back to the rover.

Drones on celestial bodies without atmosphere, like the Moon, have been proposed as drones reaching and sustaining above ground or sub-orbital flight through thrusters, creating the need for reaction mass.

== Military ==
UAVs are used by a broad range of military forces, from Argentina to the US and also by Islamic State of Iraq and the Levant (ISIS).

As of January 2014, the U.S. military operated 7,362 RQ-11B Ravens; 145 AeroVironment RQ-12A Wasps; 1,137 AeroVironment RQ-20A Pumas; 306 RQ-16 T-Hawk small UAS; 246 Predators and MQ-1C Grey Eagles; 126 MQ-9 Reapers; 491 RQ-7 Shadows and 33 RQ-4 Global Hawk large systems. The MQ-9 Reaper costs $12 million while a manned F-22 costs over $120 million.

ISIS announced a "Unmanned Aircraft of the Mujahideen" unit in January 2017 and use drones for both reconnaissance and to drop bombs.

=== Reconnaissance ===
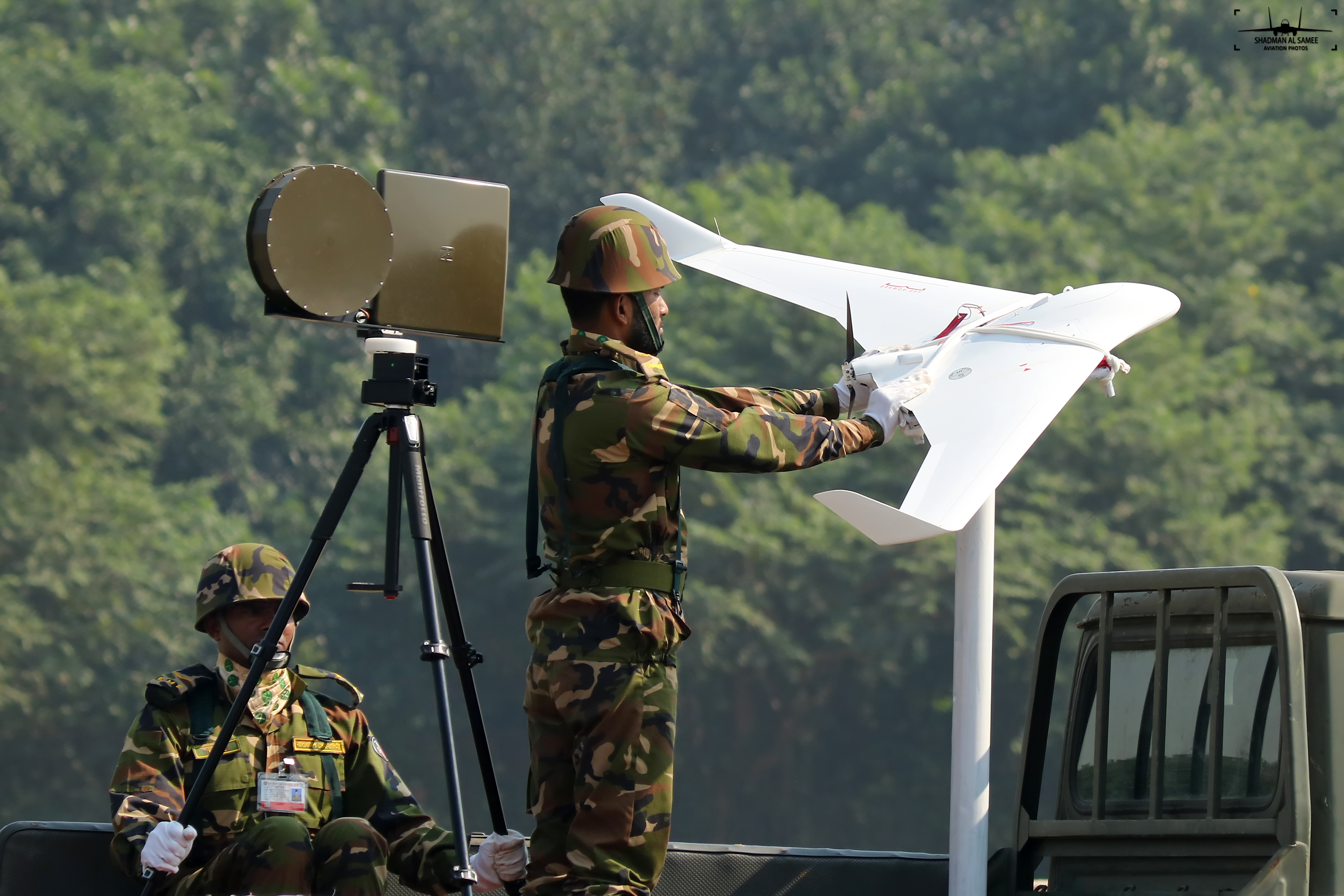
Bangladesh Army Bramor C4EYE in Victory Day Parade 2017

The Tu-141 "Swift" reusable Soviet reconnaissance UAV is intended for reconnaissance to a depth of several hundred kilometers from the front line at supersonic speeds. The Tu-123 "Hawk" is a supersonic long-range reconnaissance UAV intended for conducting photographic and signals intelligence to a distance of 3200 km; it was produced beginning in 1964. The La-17P (UAV) is a reconnaissance UAV produced since 1963. In 1945 the Soviet Union began producing "doodlebug". 43 Soviet/Russian UAV models are known.

In 2013, the U.S. Navy launched a UAV from a submerged submarine, the first step to "providing mission intelligence, surveillance and reconnaissance capabilities to the U.S. Navy's submarine force."

Turkish forces have used the Bayraktar Tactical UAS for reconnaissance during operations in northern Syria.

=== Attack ===
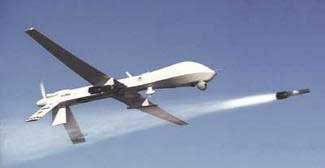
Predator launching a Hellfire missile

UAVs avoid potential diplomatic embarrassment when a manned aircraft is shot down and the pilots captured.

MQ-1 Predator UAVs armed with Hellfire missiles have been used by the U.S. as platforms for hitting ground targets. Armed Predators were first used in late 2001, mostly aimed at assassinating high-profile individuals (terrorist leaders, etc.) inside Afghanistan.

Islamic State of Iraq and the Levant have used drones, adapting UAVs bought online, to drop explosives, primarily using quadcopters. Other groups in Syria are also thought to have used UAVs in attacks. A swarm of drones armed with bombs attacked Russian bases in western Syria in early January 2018.

==== Defense against UAVs ====
The US armed forces have no defense against low-level UAV attack, but the Joint Integrated Air and Missile Defense Organization is working to repurpose existing systems. Two German companies are developing 40-kW lasers to damage UAVs. Other systems still include the OpenWorks Engineering Skywall and the Battelle DroneDefender.

In late 2017, Russia established a ground-based unit to combat UAVs by jamming their controlling signals. They used jamming and anti-aircraft fire to defend against a swarm attack in Syria in early January 2018.

ALKA is directed-energy weapon (DEW) system is a Turkish dual electromagnetic/laser weapon developed by Roketsan allegedly used to destroy one of GNC's Wing Loong II UAVs; if true, this would represent the first known time a vehicle mounted combat laser was used to destroy another combat vehicle during genuine wartime conditions.

=== Targets for military training ===
Since 1997, the US military has used more than 80 F-4 Phantoms converted into UAVs as aerial targets for combat training of human pilots. The F-4s were supplemented in September 2013 with F-16s as more realistically maneuverable targets.

== Demining ==
Since January 2016 British scientists are developing UAVs with advanced imaging technology to more cheaply and effectively map and speed up the clearing of minefields. The Find A Better Way charity, working since 2011 to advance technologies that will enable safer and more efficient clearance of landmines, teamed up with scientists at the University of Bristol to develop UAVs fit with hyperspectral imaging technology that can quickly identify landmines buried in the ground. John Fardoulis, project researcher from Bristol University states that "the maps [their] UAVs will generate should help deminers focus on the places where mines are most likely to be found". Their intended UAVs will be able to perform flyovers and gather images at various wavelengths which, according to Dr John Day from the University of Bristol, could indicate explosive chemicals seeping from landmines into the surrounding foliage as "chemicals in landmines leak out and are often absorbed by plants, causing abnormalities" which can be detected as "living plants have a very distinctive reflection in the near infrared spectrum, just beyond human vision, which makes it possible to tell how healthy they are".

The Dutch Mine Kafon project, led by designer Massoud Hassani is working on a UAV system that can quickly detect and clear land mines. The unmanned airborne de-mining system called Mine Kafon Drone uses a three step process to autonomously map, detect and detonate land mines. It flies above potentially dangerous areas, generating a 3D map, and uses a metal detector to pinpoint the location of mines. The UAV can then place a detonator above the mines using its robotic gripping arm, before retreating to a safe distance. The firm claims its UAV is safer, 20 times faster and up to 200 times cheaper than current technologies and might clear mines globally in 10 years. The project raised funds on the crowdfunding site Kickstarter with their goal set at €70,000 and receiving over €100,000 above it.

== Civil ==
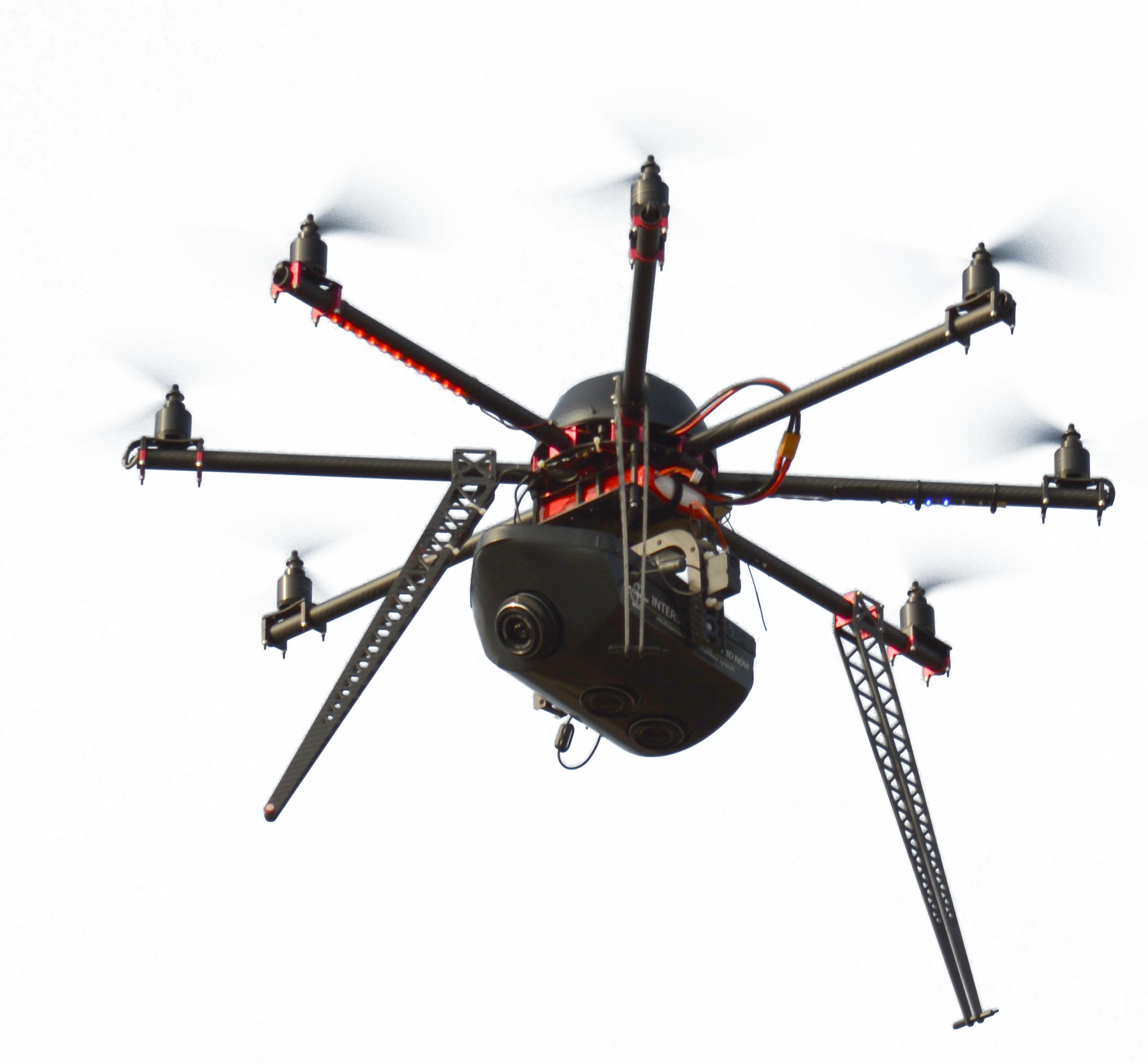
Interspect UAS B 3.1 octocopter for commercial aerial cartographic purposes and 3D mapping

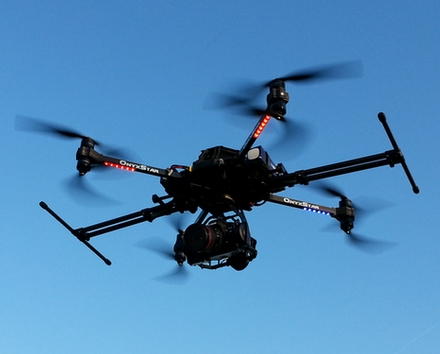
Civil UAV FOX-C8-HD AltiGator

Civil uses include aerial crop surveys, aerial photography, search and rescue, inspection of power lines and pipelines, inspections for home insurance, counting wildlife, delivering medical supplies to otherwise inaccessible regions, and detection of illegal hunting, reconnaissance operations, cooperative environment monitoring, border patrol missions, convoy protection, forest fire detection and monitoring, surveillance, coordinating humanitarian aid, plume tracking, land surveying, fire and large-accident investigation, landslide measurement, illegal landfill detection, the construction industry, smuggling, and crowd monitoring.

US government agencies use UAVs such as the RQ-9 Reaper to patrol borders, scout property and locate fugitives. One of the first authorized for domestic use was the ShadowHawk in Montgomery County, Texas SWAT and emergency management offices.

Private citizens and media organizations use UAVs for surveillance, recreation, news-gathering, or personal land assessment. In February 2012, an animal rights group used a MikroKopter hexacopter to film hunters shooting pigeons in South Carolina. The hunters then shot the UAV down. In 2014, a UAV was used to successfully locate a man with dementia, who was missing for 3 days.

=== Archaeology ===
In Peru, archaeologists used UAVs to speed up survey work and protect sites from squatters, builders and miners. Small UAVs helped researchers produce three-dimensional models of Peruvian sites instead of the usual flat maps – and in days and weeks instead of months and years.

"You can go up three metres and photograph a room, 300 metres and photograph a site, or you can go up 3,000 metres and photograph the entire valley."

UAVs have replaced expensive and clumsy small planes, kites and helium balloons. UAVs costing as little as £650 have proven useful. In 2013, UAVs flew over Peruvian archaeological sites, including the colonial Andean town Machu Llacta 4,000 m (13,000 ft) above sea level. The UAVs had altitude problems in the Andes, leading to plans to make a UAV blimp.

In Jordan, UAVs were used to discover evidence of looted archaeological sites.

In September 2014, UAVs were used for 3D mapping of the above-ground ruins of Aphrodisias and the Gallo-Roman remains in Switzerland.

On 6 February 2017 it was reported that scientists from the UK and Brazil discovered hundreds of ancient earthworks similar to those at Stonehenge in the Amazon rainforest with the use of UAVs.

=== Cargo transport ===
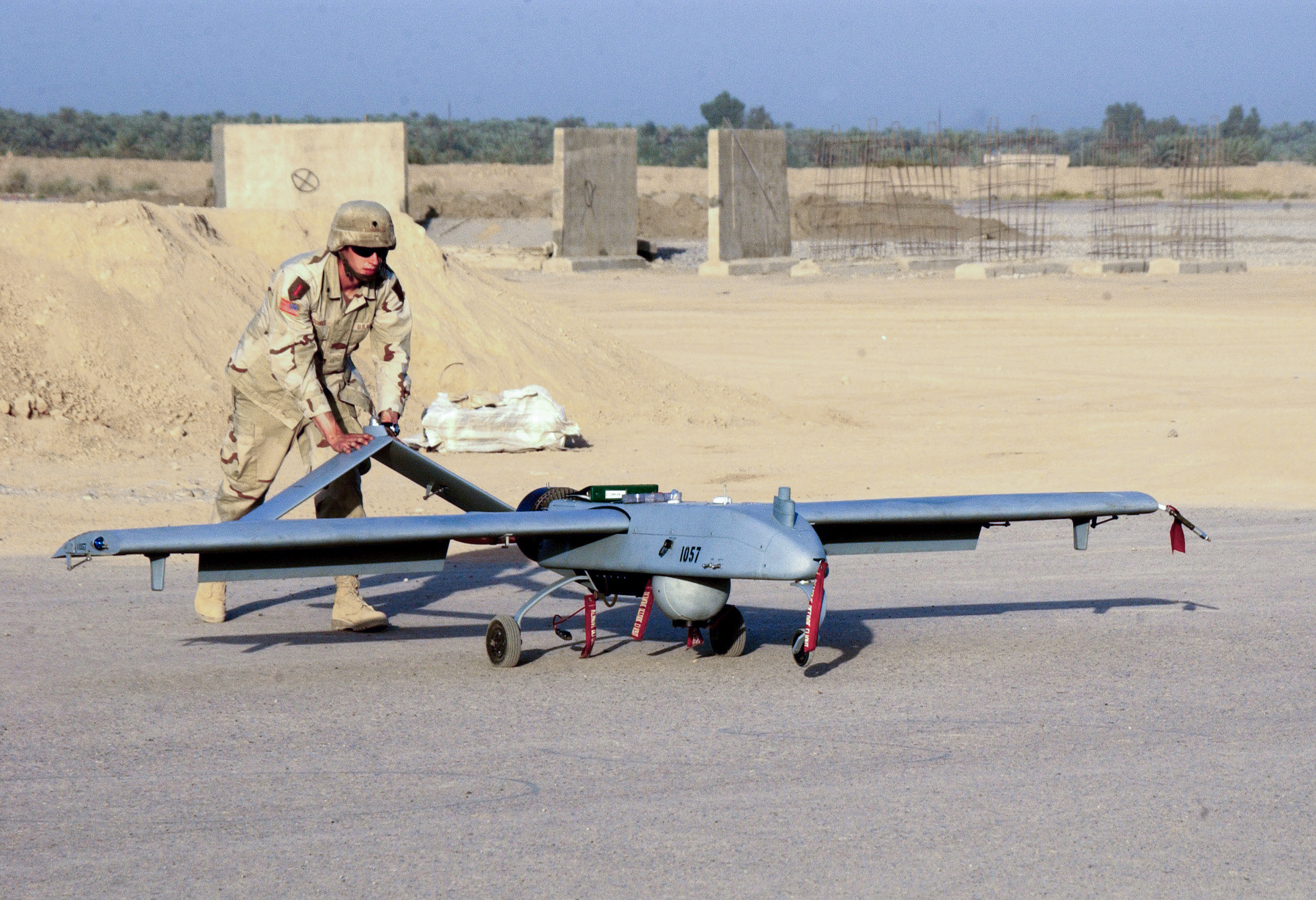
The RQ-7 Shadow can deliver a "Quick-MEDS" canister to front-line troops.

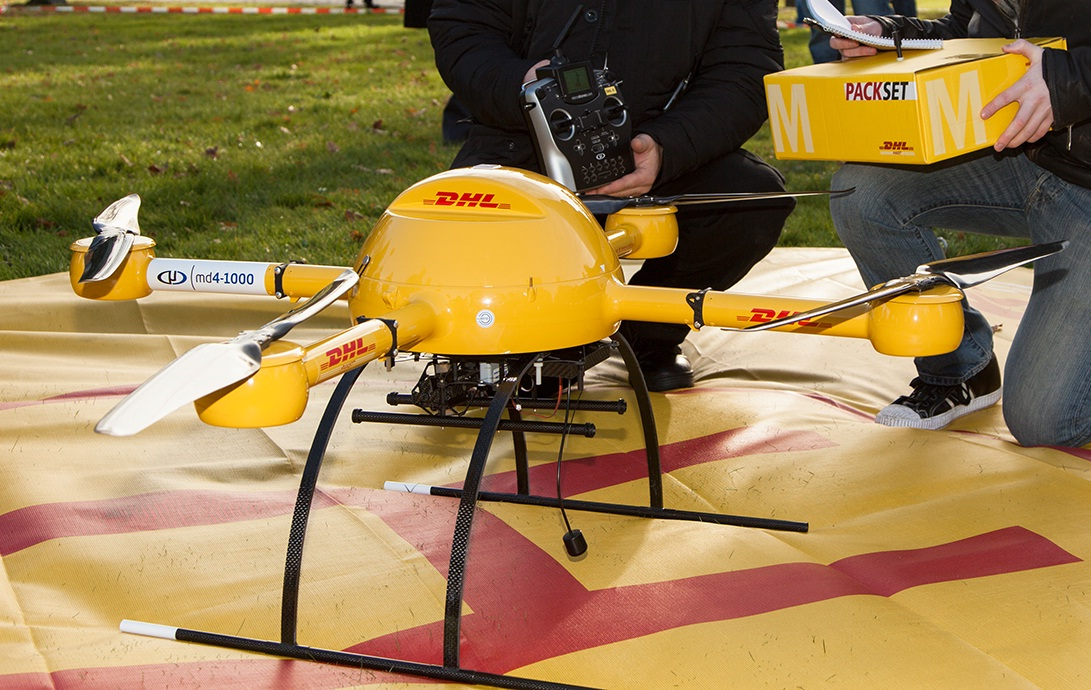
In 2013, the DHL parcel service tested a "microdrones md4-1000" for delivery of medicine.

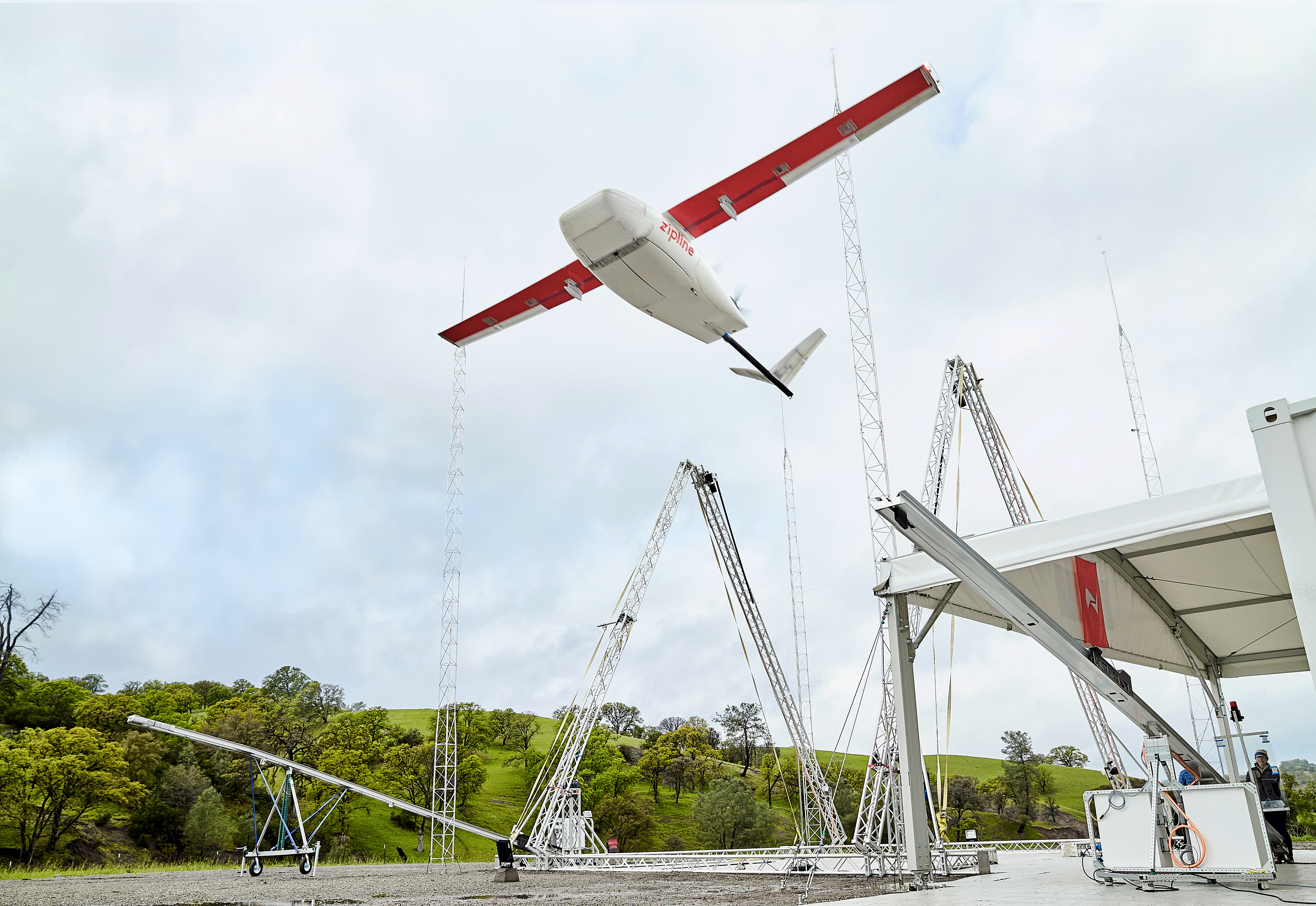
Zipline drone providing commercial medical supplies in Africa

UAVs can transport medicines and medical specimens into and out of inaccessible regions. In 2013, in a research project of DHL, a small quantity of medicine was delivered via a UAV.

Initial attempts at commercial use of UAVs, such as the Tacocopter company for food delivery, were blocked by FAA regulation. A 2013 announcement that Amazon was planning deliveries using UAVs was met with skepticism.

In 2014, the prime minister of the United Arab Emirates announced that the UAE planned to launch a fleet of UAVs to deliver official documents and supply emergency services at accidents.

Google revealed in 2014 it had been testing UAVs for two years. The Google X program aims to produce UAVs that can deliver items.

16 July 2015, A NASA Langley fixed-wing Cirrus SR22 aircraft, flown remotely from the ground, operated by NASA's Langley Research Center in Hampton and a hexacopter UAV delivered pharmaceuticals and other medical supplies to an outdoor free clinic at the Wise County Fairgrounds, Virginia. The aircraft picked up 10 pounds of pharmaceuticals and supplies from an airport in Tazewell County in southwest Virginia and delivered the medicine to the Lonesome Pine Airport in Wise County. The aircraft had a pilot on board for safety. The supplies went to a crew, which separated the supplies into 24 smaller packages to be delivered by small, unmanned UAV to the free clinic, during multiple flights over two hours. A company pilot controlled the hexacopter, which lowered the pharmaceuticals to the ground by tether. Health care workers distributed the medications to appropriate patients.

The Uvionix Nksy aerial delivery service is planning to allow local shops to deliver goods from a UAV. The company wants to deliver fast food, beer, coffee, soda, electronics, prescriptions and personal care products.

=== Conservation ===
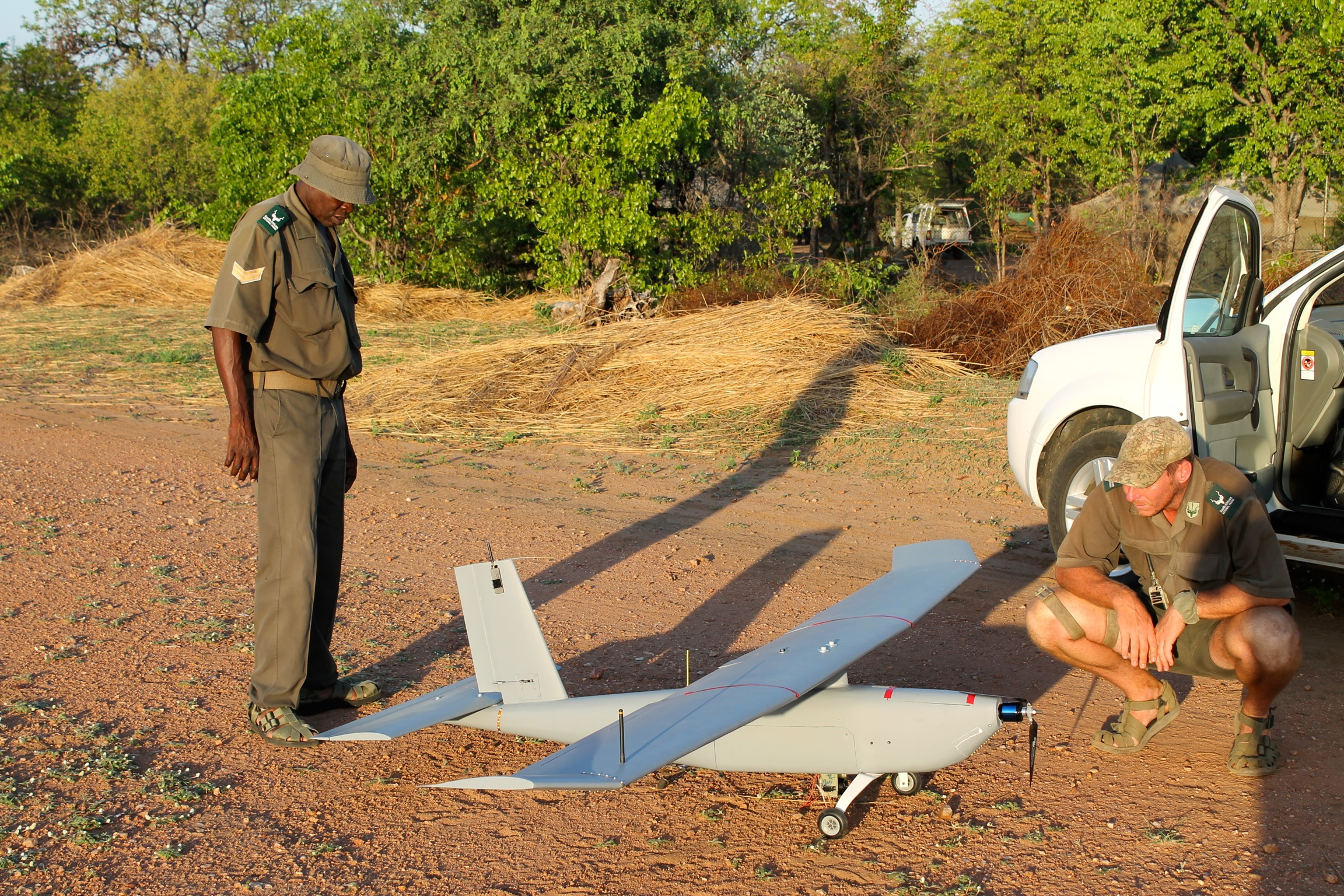
ShadowView Eco Ranger

In 2011, Lian Pin Koh and Serge Wich conceived the idea of using UAVs for conservation-related applications, before founding ConservationDrones in 2012. ConservationDrones works with NGOs, research organizations, and governments to collect environmental data through drone usage. They also work to provide low cost UAVs to these organizations, especially in developing countries, for as little as $2500. UAV usage in conservation is able to alleviate many of the challenges facing conservationists on foot, such as "the large size of species' geographic ranges, low population densities, inaccessible habitat, elusive behavior and sensitivity to disturbance." By 2012 the International Anti-Poaching Foundation was using UAVs. A whale conservation UAV capable of collecting blowhole mucus into a sterile petri dish was put into use in January 2018 following its development by researchers at Macquarie University in Sydney, Australia.

UAVs have a particular role in anti-poaching activities. In June 2012, World Wide Fund for Nature (WWF) announced it would begin using UAVs in Nepal to aid conservation efforts following a successful trial of two aircraft in Chitwan National Park. The global wildlife organization planned to train ten personnel to use the UAVs, with operational use beginning in the fall. In August 2012, UAVs were used by members of the Sea Shepherd Conservation Society in Namibia to document the annual seal cull. In December 2013, the Falcon UAV was selected by the Namibian Government and WWF to help combat rhinoceros poaching. The UAVs will operate in Etosha National Park and will use implanted RFID tags.

In 2012, the WWFund supplied two FPV Raptor 1.6 UAVs to Nepal National Parks. These UAVs were used to monitor rhinos, tigers and elephants and deter poachers. The UAVs were equipped with time-lapse cameras and could fly for 18 miles at 650 feet.

In December 2012, Kruger National Park started using a Seeker II UAV against rhino poachers. The UAV was loaned to the South African National Parks authority by its manufacturer, Denel Dynamics of South Africa.

Anti-whaling activists used an Osprey UAV (made by Kansas-based Hangar 18) in 2012 to monitor Japanese whaling ships in the Antarctic.

In 2012, the Ulster Society for the Prevention of Cruelty to Animals used a quadcopter UAV to deter badger baiters in Northern Ireland. In March 2013, the British League Against Cruel Sports announced that they had carried out trial flights with UAVs and planned to use a fixed-wing OpenRanger and an "octocopter" to gather evidence to make private prosecutions against illegal hunting of foxes and other animals. The UAVs were supplied by ShadowView. A spokesman for Privacy International said that "licensing and permission for UAVs is only on the basis of health and safety, without considering whether privacy rights are violated." CAA rules prohibit flying a UAV within 50 m of a person or vehicle.

In Pennsylvania, Showing Animals Respect and Kindness used UAVs to monitor people shooting at pigeons for sport. One of their UAVs was shot down by hunters.

In March 2013, UAV conservation nonprofit ShadowView, founded by former members of Sea Shepherd Conservation Society, worked with antihunting charity the League Against Cruel Sports to expose illegal fox hunting in the UK.

In 2014, Will Potter proposed using UAVs to monitor conditions on factory farms. The idea is to circumvent ag-gag prohibitions by keeping the UAVs on public property, but equipping them with cameras sensitive enough to monitor distant activities. Potter raised nearly $23,000 in 2 days for this project on Kickstarter.

=== Healthcare ===
A 2018 review identified three roles for UAVs in healthcare:

- Prehospital emergency care; companies such as Everdrone AB in Sweden or Medifly in Germany have successfully either implemented or tested delivery of emergency services.
- Speeding up laboratory testing; one example of this was Skysports and their use of drones for COVID test delivery in Scotland.
- Surveillance.

While other uses are being researched, such as their use for larval source management (LSM) to control vectors of diseases like malaria.

=== Filmmaking ===
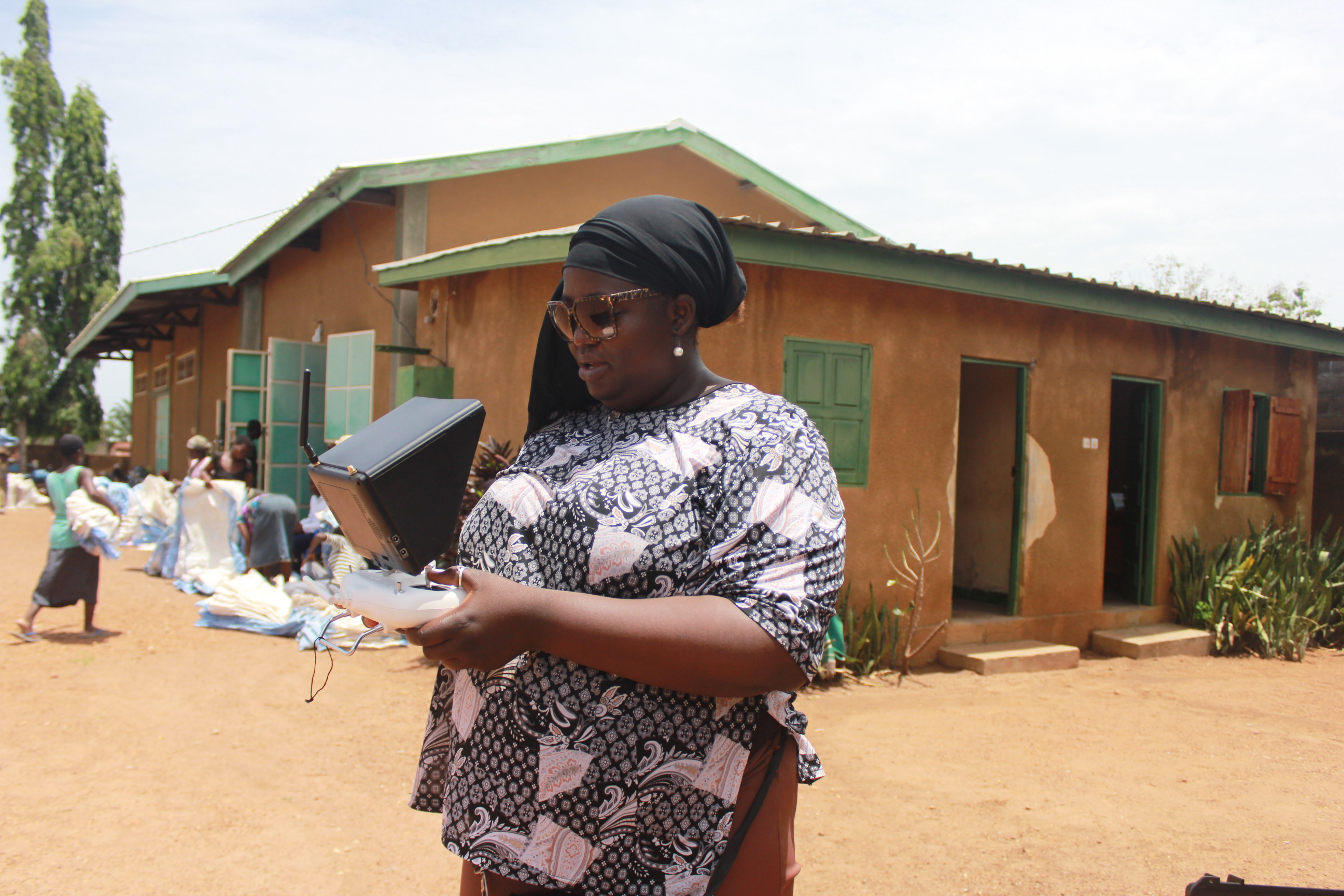
Use of UAV for documentary filmmaking in Togo

For commercial UAV camerawork inside the United States, industry sources state that usage relies on the de facto consent – or benign neglect – of local law enforcement. Use of UAVs for filmmaking is generally easier on large private lots or in rural and exurban areas with fewer space constraints. In localities such as Los Angeles and New York, authorities have actively interceded to shut down UAV filmmaking over safety or terrorism concerns.

In June 2014, the FAA acknowledged that it had received a petition from the Motion Picture Association of America seeking approval for the use of UAVs for aerial photography. Seven companies behind the petition argued that low-cost UAVs could be used for shots that would otherwise require a helicopter or a manned aircraft, saving money and reducing risk for pilot and crew. UAVs are already used by media in other parts of the world.

UAVs have been used to film sporting events, such as the 2014 Winter Olympics, as they have greater freedom of movement than cable-mounted cameras.

=== Hobby and recreational use ===
Model aircraft (small UAS) have been flown by hobbyists since the earliest days of manned flight. In the United States, hobby and recreational use of such UAS is permitted (a) strictly for hobby or recreational use; (b) when operated in accordance with a community-based set of safety guidelines and nationwide community-based organizations; (c) when limited to not more than 55 pounds (with exceptions); (d)without interfering with and giving way to any manned aircraft; and (e) within 5 miles of an airport only after notifying air traffic control. The Academy of Model Aeronautics is a community based organization that maintains operational safety guidelines with a long proven history of effectiveness and safety.

Recreational uses of UAVs include:

- Filming and photographing recreational activity
- Drone racing, generally in the form where participants control radio-controlled UAVs equipped with cameras, while wearing head-mounted displays showing the live stream camera feed from the drones.
- Being pulled by a UAV in combination with some sports equipment, such as a snowboard ("droneboarding"),, wakeboard ("drone surfing"), paraglider or hang glider. However, these activities generally require rather large (and hence rather expensive) UAVs.

=== Journalism ===
Journalists are interested in using UAVs for newsgathering. The College of Journalism and Mass Communications at the University of Nebraska–Lincoln established the Drone Journalism Lab. University of Missouri created the Missouri Drone Journalism Program. The Professional Society of Drone Journalists was established in 2011. UAVs have covered disasters such as typhoons. A coalition of 11 news organizations is working with the Mid-Atlantic Aviation Partnership at Virginia Tech on how reporters could use unmanned aircraft to gather news.

=== Law enforcement ===
Many police departments in the world have procured UAVs for law and order and aerial surveillance. UAVs have been used for domestic police work in Canada and the United States. A dozen US police forces had applied for UAV permits by March 2013. UAVs have been used by U.S. Customs and Border Protection since 2005. with plans to use armed UAVs. The FBI stated in 2013 that they use UAVs for "surveillance".

In 2014, it was reported that five English police forces had obtained or operated UAVs for observation. Merseyside police caught a car thief with a UAV in 2010, but the UAV was lost during a subsequent training exercise and the police stated the UAV would not be replaced due to operational limitations and the cost of staff training.

Approximately 167 police and fire departments bought unmanned aerial vehicles in the United States in 2016, double the number that were purchased in 2015.

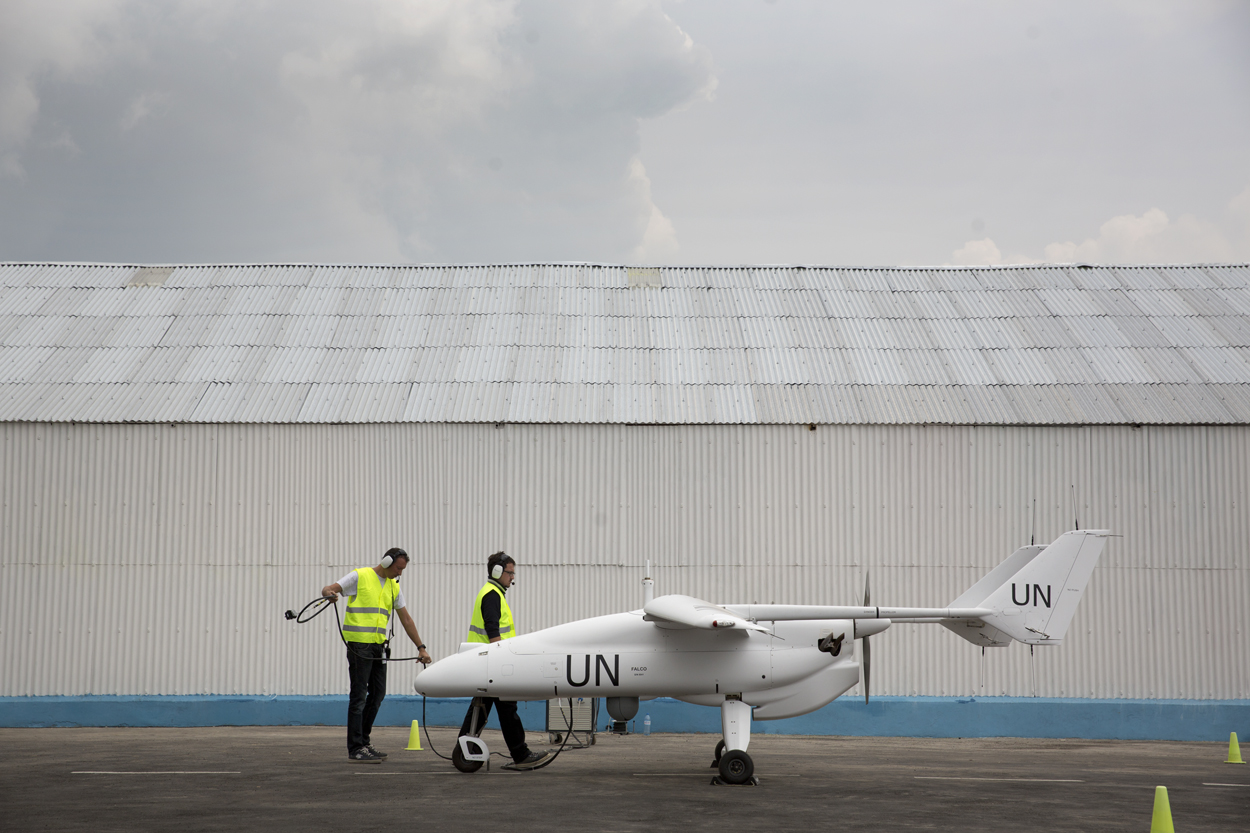
A UAV in Goma as part of MONUSCO peacekeeping mission

In August 2013, the Italian defence company Selex ES provided an unarmed surveillance UAV to the Democratic Republic of Congo to monitor movements of armed groups in the region and to protect the civilian population more effectively.

Dutch train networks use tiny UAVs to look out for graffiti as an alternative to CCTV cameras.

=== Scientific research ===
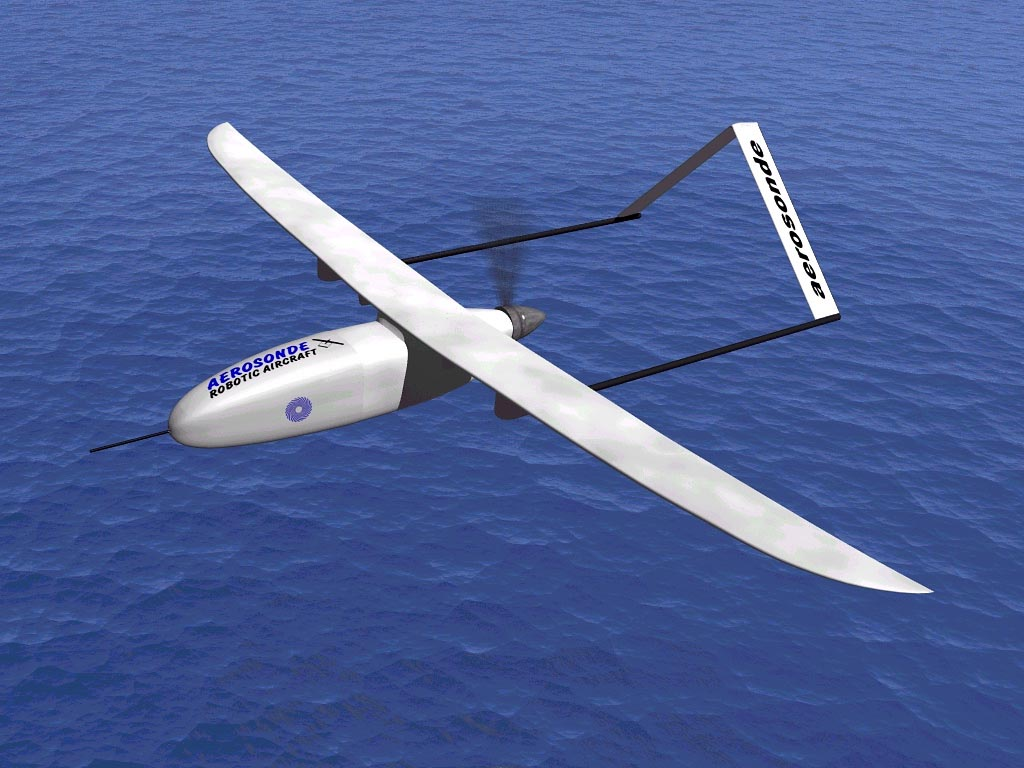
AAI Corporation Aerosonde

UAVs are especially useful in accessing areas that are too dangerous for manned aircraft. The U.S. National Oceanic and Atmospheric Administration began using the Aerosonde unmanned aircraft system in 2006 as a hurricane hunter. The 35-pound system can fly into a hurricane and communicate near-real-time data directly to the National Hurricane Center. Beyond the standard barometric pressure and temperature data typically culled from manned hurricane hunters, the Aerosonde system provides measurements from closer to the water's surface than before. NASA later began using the Northrop Grumman RQ-4 Global Hawk for hurricane measurements.

To extend atmospheric measurements into more challenging meteorological conditions, UAV platforms continue to evolve beyond traditional fixed-wing configurations. Among such developments are rotary-wing aircraft provide improved stability and resilience in turbulent air. The example is ThunderFly TF-G2, an unmanned autogyro specifically designed for vertical profiling and in-situ scientific measurements in adverse weather conditions.

=== Search and rescue ===
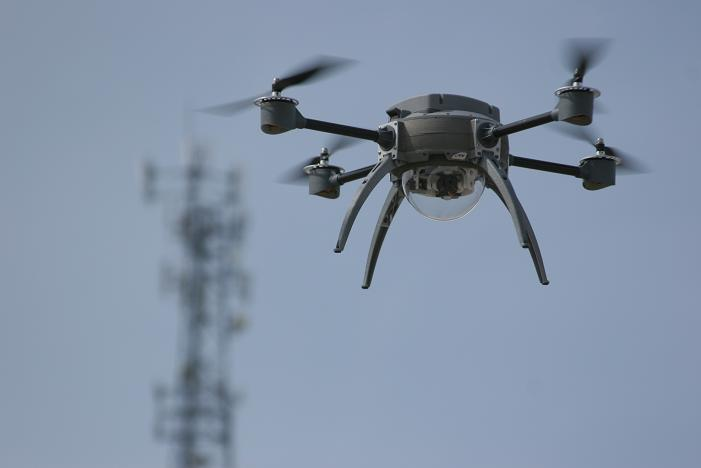
Aeryon Scout in flight

UAVs were used in search and rescue after hurricanes struck Louisiana and Texas in 2008. Predators, operating between 18,000 and 29,000 feet, performed search and rescue and damage assessment. Payloads were an optical sensor and a synthetic aperture radar. The latter can penetrate clouds, rain or fog and in daytime or nighttime conditions, all in real time. Photos taken before and after the storm are compared and a computer highlights damage areas. Micro UAVs, such as the Aeryon Scout, have been used to perform search and rescue activities on a smaller scale, such as the search for missing persons.

In 2014, a UAV helped locate an 82-year-old man who had been missing for three days. The UAV searched a 200-acre field and located the man in 20 minutes. In March 2017, DJI released a study of lives saved by the use of drones stating at least 59 lives have been saved by civilian drones in 18 different incidents.

UAVs have been tested as airborne lifeguards, locating distressed swimmers using thermal cameras and dropping life preservers to swimmers. In January 2018, the lives of two teenage boys were saved by a drone in New South Wales, Australia. They were struggling in heavy waters around 700 meters away from the shoreline. Lifesavers, while still in training to use the drone system, immediately dispatched the drone to the site, where it dropped the inflatable rescue pod.

=== Surveillance ===
Aerial surveillance of large areas is possible with low-cost UAS. Surveillance applications include livestock monitoring, wildfire mapping, pipeline security, home security, road patrol and antipiracy. UAVs in commercial aerial surveillance (like the Applied Aeronautics Albatross UAV) is expanding with the advent of automated object detection.

=== Inspections ===
UAVs are increasingly finding applications in infrastructure inspections. They are particularly useful for inspections that are dangerous for human surveyors like roof inspections, power line inspections, wind turbine inspections, mining inspections or inspections inside power-plants. Home insurance companies are also using them to monitor tree growth and roof conditions. UAVs carrying thermal cameras are frequently used for solar panel or building inspections.

=== Surveying ===
Unmanned aerial photogrammetric survey: UAS technologies are used worldwide, often for aerial photogrammetry or with LiDAR sensors.

==== Pollution monitoring ====
UAVs equipped with air quality monitors provide real time air analysis at various elevations.

==== Oil, gas and mineral exploration and production ====
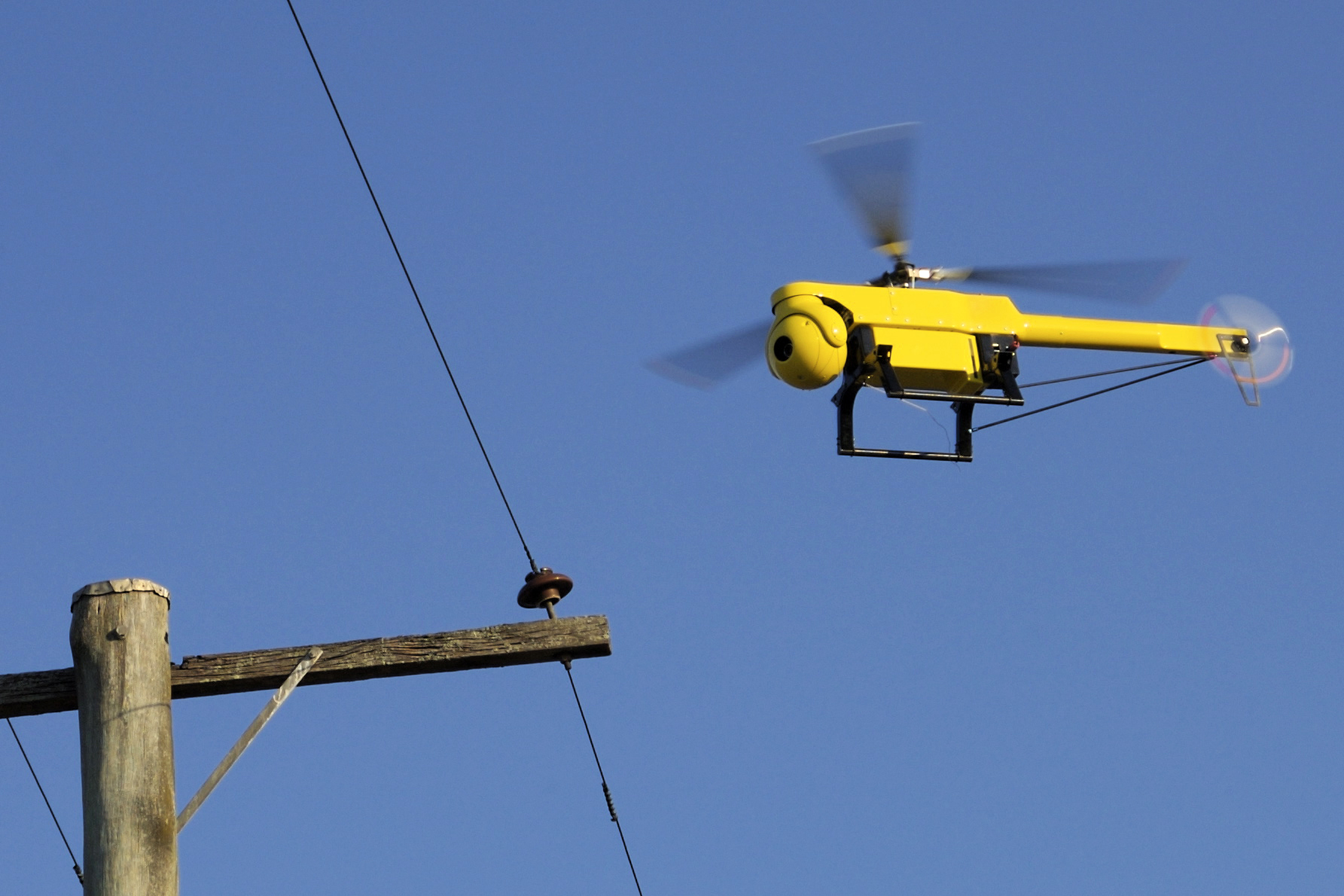
Camclone T21 UAV fitted with CSIRO guidance system used to inspect power lines (2009)

UAVs can be used to perform geophysical surveys, in particular geomagnetic surveys where measurements of the Earth's varying magnetic field strength are used to calculate the nature of the underlying magnetic rock structure. A knowledge of the underlying rock structure helps to predict the location of mineral deposits. Oil and natural gas extraction entail the monitoring of the integrity of oil and gas pipelines and related installations. For above-ground pipelines, this monitoring activity can be performed using digital cameras mounted on UAVs.

In 2012, Cavim, the state-run arms manufacturer of Venezuela, claimed to be producing its own UAV as part of a system to survey and monitor pipelines, dams and other rural infrastructure.

=== Disaster relief ===
UAVs can help in disaster relief by providing intelligence across an affected area.

For example, two George Mason University students are aiming to design a device that uses soundwaves to extinguish fire. Their idea specifies using the technology with UAVs: Equip unmanned aerial vehicles with an extinguisher that works through soundwaves and send them into fires that are too dangerous for people to enter.

T-Hawk and Global Hawk UAVs were used to gather information about the damaged Fukushima Number 1 nuclear plant and disaster-stricken areas of the Tōhoku region after the March 2011 tsunami.

As of 2023, there have been an increasing number of entrants to the drone space, specifically for wildfire management - Data Blanket being one of several.

=== Agriculture ===
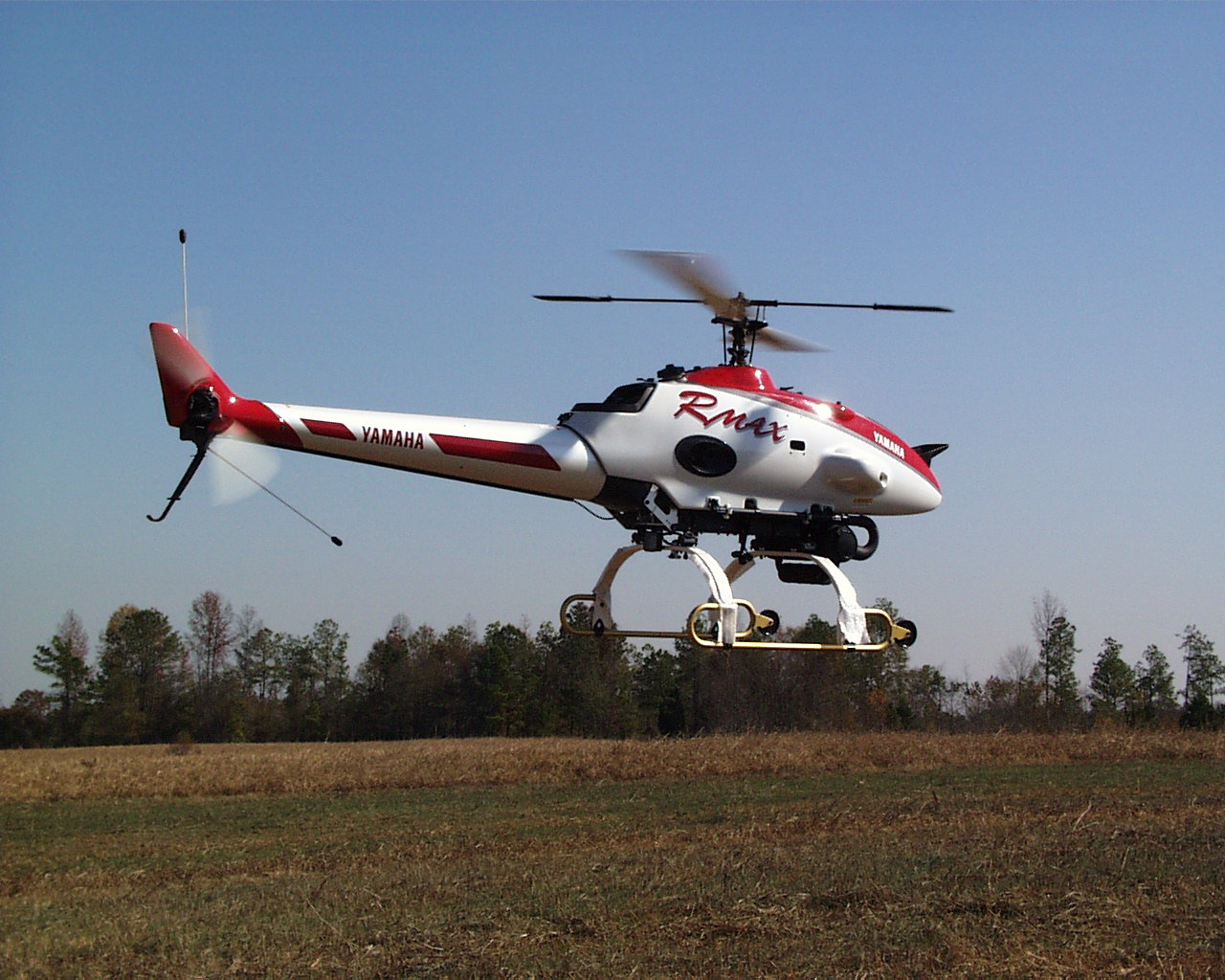
A Yamaha R-MAX, a UAV that has been used for aerial application in Japan

Japanese farmers have been using Yamaha's R-50 and RMAX unmanned helicopters to dust their crops since 1987. Some farming initiatives in the U.S. use UAVs for crop spraying, as they are often cheaper than a full-sized helicopter.

UAV are also now becoming an invaluable tool by farmers in other aspect of farming, such as monitoring livestock, crops and water levels. NDVI images, generated with a near-IR sensor, can provide detailed information on crop health, improving yield and reducing input cost. Sophisticated UAV have also been used to create 3D images of the landscape to plan for future expansions and upgrading.

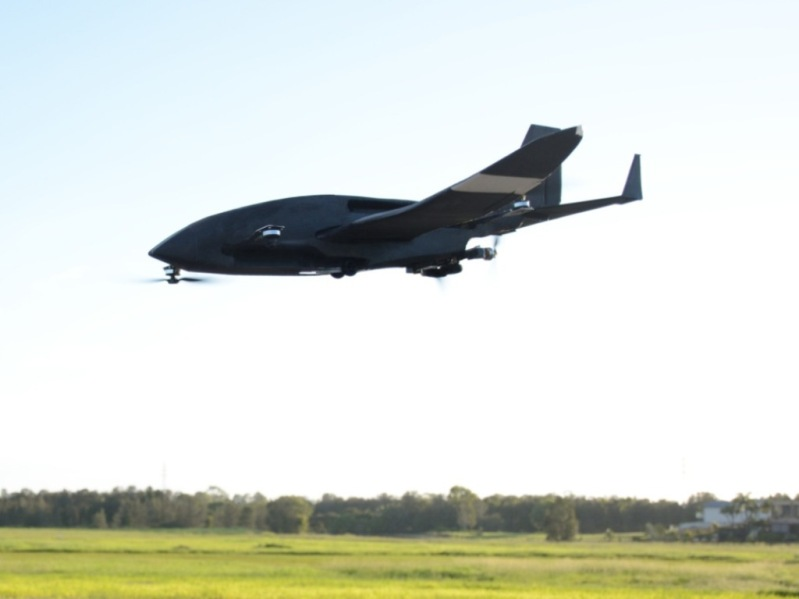
Krossblade SkyProwler transformer UAV for research into vertical take-off and landing technologies for aircraft

=== Manufacturing ===
Drones can be used for the additive manufacturing of structures in a singular sense or under the breadth of swarm 3D printing. This is particularly useful for the production of large structures and components, where traditional 3D printing is not able to be utilized due to hardware size constraints. The challenges in this field include a very high demand for energy efficiency and stabilization of manufacturing hardware against the overarching aerial vehicle. Research in aerial manufacturing is in its early stages, however has been pursued by names such as IBM and Rosotics, the latter being the first to demonstrate swarm 3D printing using a metallic payload, and the only to achieve metallic additive manufacturing from an airborne platform. UAVs provide an alternative to traditional manufacturing systems and methodologies, since while under autonomous flight, a drone faces virtually no barrier to effective build volume, otherwise known as manufacturing scale invariance.

In June 2020, the advent of the Rapid Induction Printing metal additive manufacturing process had accelerated the field of aerial manufacturing by providing a safer and more energy efficient means to produce structures, allowing for lightweight onboard power systems consistent with the drone industry to support manufacturing applications.

=== Construction ===
At least one drone has demonstrated the feasibility of painting a wall with spray cans.

Carlo Paneni, of Ausco Modular, has conducted a preliminary proof of concept of a drone in the construction of modular buildings. In modular, most of the building is constructed in separate modules in the safe and controlled environment of a factory. Yet, after the modules are delivered on site, the gaps between such modules need to be covered: for an operation that is relative minimal, extensive protections need to be established for a worker to safely complete this task at heights. This relatively small task with high impost in terms of safety if done manually, is perfectly suited for a drone. Developed with the collaboration of Freelance Robotics, a proof of concept was conducted in Ausco Modular's hire yard in Brisbane, Australia.

In construction, drones can be used to survey building sites to help monitor and report progress, spot errors early on and avoid rework and show off finished projects in marketing materials. In China, drones may fly over a building site to monitor progress made during the day. Until 2016 this was not allowed under United States FAA regulation. US government has since passed CFR 14 Part 107 regulation which allows drone pilots to become licensed by the FAA for small UAS operation, and use drones for commercial purposes such as construction progress monitoring and site surveying. Errors in construction can be costly in terms of money and time to resolve, so detecting these errors can result in large savings. Drones may also be used in construction to measure raw materials as inputs to building construction. Aerial photographs can be used to create 3D models and 2D orthomosaic maps of buildings. Construction sites are generally high hazard environments and thus workers are already protected by hardhats and other safety precautions, which makes introduction of drones safer, however, UAS pilots are still advised to implement safety and alerting procedures and checklists. The construction companies can attempt to implement all aspects of a drone program themselves, or outsource all or parts of it to a drone services provider. Since the easing of FAA restrictions on commercial drones, there has been an increase of aerial services providers in the US and worldwide.

In 2022, engineers reported the development of swarms of autonomous 3D-printing drones for additive manufacturing and repair.

=== Passenger transport ===
In January 2016, Ehang UAV announced UAVs capable of carrying passengers. As of 2021 mid-2021, there have been several other companies that have entered the "passenger drone" (or "air taxi") market and plan to release their own passenger drones by 2024. These include: Archer, Joby, Lilium, Volocopter among others.

=== Visual art ===
UAVs equipped with LED's can be used to give a nighttime aerial display, for example Intels "Shooting star" UAV system used by Disney and Super Bowl 2017 halftime show In Thailand, a locally developed software were created to organize light shows in celebration of the coronation of King Vajiralongkorn in 2019, and various royal observances afterward. Such light shows are described in news media as alternatives to firework shows due to concerns about safety, noise and pollution by fireworks explosions.

=== Pandemic response ===
During the COVID-19 pandemic, governments in China, France, India, Morocco, and the United States have used drones to find illegal gatherings of people, and in some cases to warn people violating pandemic protection orders. A project of the Australian Department of Defense aims to detect hotspots by measuring body temperatures of people in public with infrared cameras. As mentioned above, there were also other implementations such as Skyports in the UK for delivery of COVID tests in Scotland.

== Criminal and terrorist ==
Some UAVs have been observed dropping contraband onto U.S. prisons. The New York City Police Department is concerned about UAV attacks with chemical weapons, firearms, or explosives; one UAV nearly collided with an NYPD helicopter. Others have voiced concerns about assassinations and attacks on nuclear power stations.

Uses already seen include:

- Surveillance for ISIS in Iraq and Syria
- Landing radioactive material on the roof of the Japanese Prime Minister's office possibly in protest of nuclear energy policy
- Incitement of a brawl when an UAV flew a flag over a soccer stadium
- Invasion of Israeli airspace by Hezbollah
- Smuggling of drugs across borders and into prisons

== See also ==
- International Aerial Robotics Competition
- Micro air vehicle
- Miniature UAV
- Quadcopter
- ParcAberporth
- Radio-controlled aircraft
- Satellite Sentinel Project
- Tactical Control System
