= Koh Lian Pin =

Singaporean politician

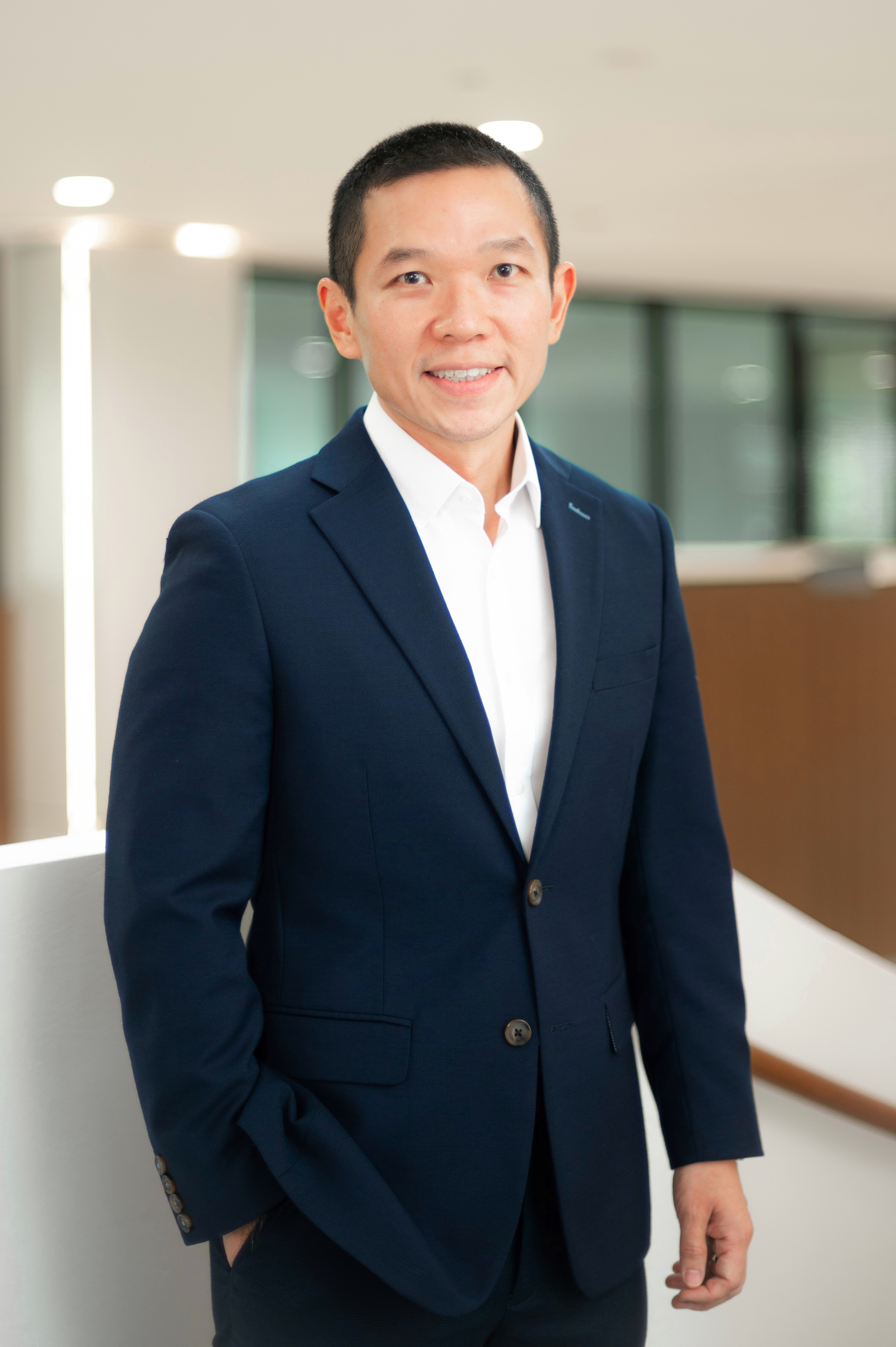
- Koh Lian Pin in September 2023
- Born: 1976 (age 49–50); Singapore
- Education: Princeton University (PhD), National University of Singapore (BSc, MSc)
- Organisation: National University of Singapore
- Known for: Conservation science, TED talk
- Awards: World Economic Forum Young Global Leader 2013

Koh Lian Pin (born 1976 in Singapore) is a Singaporean conservation scientist. He is Vice President (Sustainability & Resilience), and Chief Sustainability Scientist at the National University of Singapore (NUS), where he oversees and champions sustainability-related research. He employs a whole-of-University strategy to bridge academia with policy makers, industry and civil society, driving change across sectors to tackle the twin planetary crises of climate change and biodiversity loss.

By initiating and spearheading engagements with stakeholders locally and at international fora, Koh seeks to promote societal understanding of the world, and amplify the university’s and Singapore’s contributions to sustainability efforts globally.

He is also the Kwan Im Thong Hood Cho Temple Chair Professor of Conservation, and Director of the Centre for Nature-based Climate Solutions at NUS.

Koh is a highly cited conservation scientists, with over 20 years of international research experience. His previous roles include Swiss National Science Foundation Professor at ETH Zurich, Chair of Applied Ecology and Conservation at the University of Adelaide, Vice President of Science Partnerships and Innovation at Conservation International Foundation. He was also the Founding Director of Conservation Drones, a non-profit organisation that seeks to introduce drone technology to conservation scientists and practitioners worldwide.

On 14 January 2021, Koh was appointed as one of nine Nominated Members of Parliament (NMP) in the 14th Parliament of Singapore, which began on 21 January 2021.

On 15 June 2026, Koh was appointed the Dean of the Faculty of Science at the National University of Singapore, succeeding Professor Sun Yeneng.

== Education ==
Koh studied at Hwa Chong Institution for his pre-tertiary education in Singapore. He completed his Bachelor of Science (with First Class Honours) and Master of Science degrees at the National University of Singapore in 2001 and 2003, respectively. Koh received his PhD from the Department of Ecology and Evolutionary Biology at Princeton University, New Jersey, US in 2008. Following that, he received postdoctoral training at ETH Zurich.

== Research ==
Koh's scientific contributions include the study of species co-extinctions and modeling the environmental impacts of industrial agriculture across the tropics.

His research focuses on developing innovative science and science-based decision support tools to reconcile societal needs with environmental protection. He addresses this challenge through field studies and experiments, computer simulations and modelling, as well as by co-opting emerging technologies for use in environmental research and applications.

His more recent research as Director of the Centre for Nature-based Climate Solutions seeks to produce policy-relevant science on nature-based climate solutions including tackling climate change by protecting and better managing natural ecosystems to address knowledge gaps, build capacity and deliver pragmatic solutions and innovations to inform climate policies, strategies and actions to achieve the centre's vision.

Koh’s research is complemented by his rich work in advocacy, which has seen him offer a science-based perspective to socioeconomic and environmental issues on both local and global platforms, including speaking at the United Nations Climate Change Conferences (COP27 in Sharm El Sheik and COP28 in Dubai), TED Global and TEDx conferences, among others.

== Impact ==
Koh has published over 150 journal articles, including Nature, Science, and Proceedings of the National Academy of Sciences USA. He is one of the most cited conservation scientists in the world. His research has received over 33,000 citations (with an h-index of >80).

Koh is a pioneer in the use of low-cost drone technology for environmental applications. He founded Conservation Drones, which has received numerous awards and media coverage.

Koh was an invited speaker at the TED Global 2013: Think Again conference in Edinburgh, where he spoke on the positive use of drones.

== Awards ==
Koh has received multiple awards including the Frontiers Planet Prize National Champion in 2023, the Australian Research Council Future Fellowship Level II in 2014, the Swiss National Science Foundation Professorship in 2011, the ETH Fellowship in 2008, and was also named a World Economic Forum Young Global Leader in 2013.

In 2020, Koh received an award from the National Research Foundation of the Singapore Prime Minister's Office under its Returning Singaporean Scientists Scheme. Established in 2013, the Scheme seeks to attract outstanding overseas-based Singaporean research leaders back to Singapore to take up leadership positions in Singapore's autonomous universities and publicly funded research institutes. Koh was the sixth recipient of the award.

== Outreach ==
Koh is a regular plenary speaker at international meetings, including the WWF Fuller Symposium in 2012, the Clinton Global Initiative University in 2013, and the Intergovernmental Eye on Earth Summit in 2015.

Koh's work has been featured in international media, including The New York Times, Smithsonian magazine, Scientific American, NewScientist, The Telegraph, among others.
