= Jesse Wilson =

Jesse Wilson may refer to:

- Jesse A. Wilson Jr., United States Navy officer
- Jesse Wilson (record producer), American songwriter and producer

== See also ==
- Jess Wilson, Australian politician
- Jessie Wilson Sayre, née Wilson, daughter of US president Woodrow Wilson, activist for women's suffrage
- Jessy Wilson, American singer
