= Jesse A. Wilson Jr. =

United States rear admiral (born 1964)

Rear Admiral Jesse A. Wilson Jr.
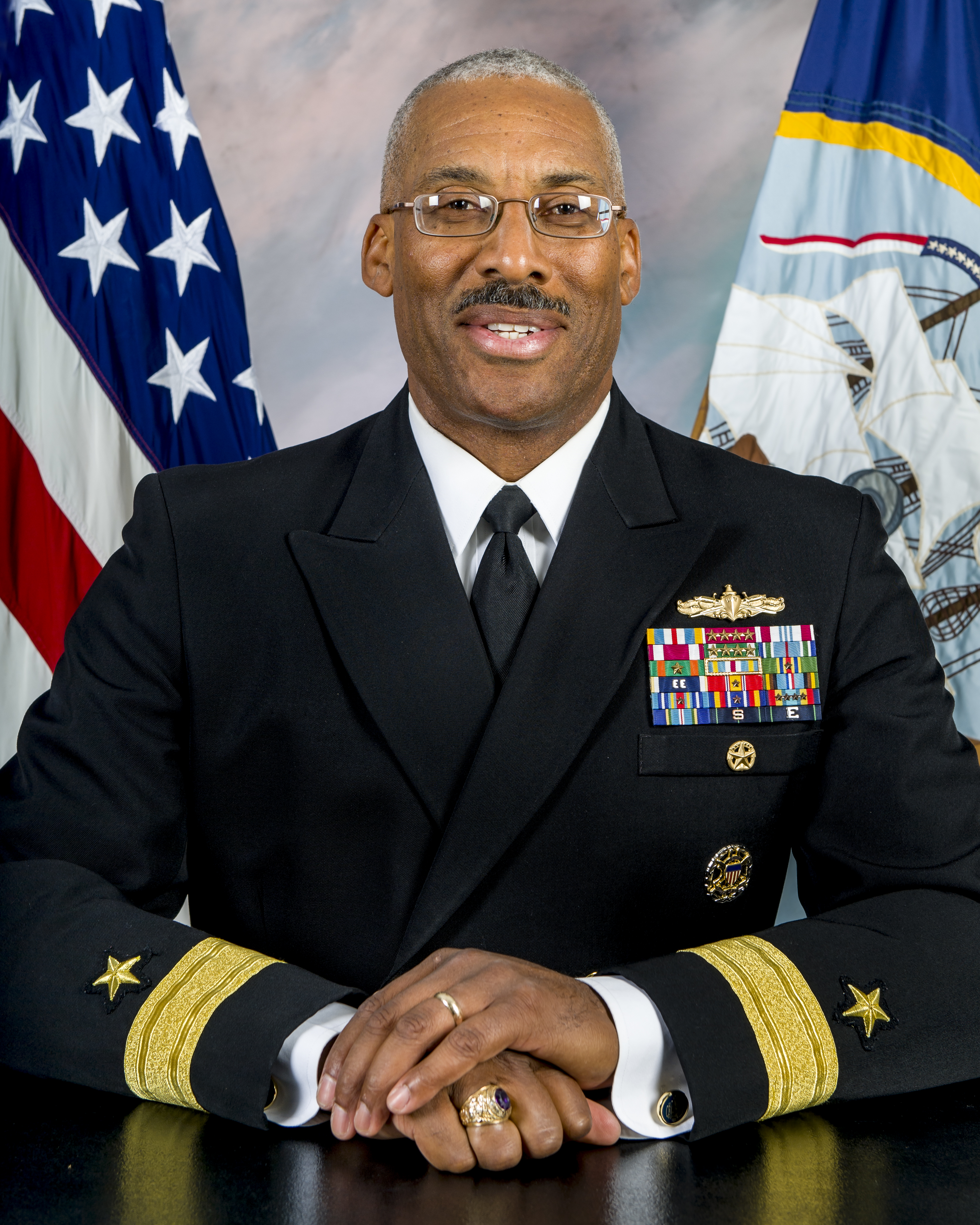
- Born: February 29, 1964 (age 62); Norfolk, Virginia
- Military career
- Allegiance: United States of America
- Branch: United States Navy
- Service years: 1986–2019
- Rank: Rear admiral (lower half)
- Unit: Joint Integrated Air and Missile Defense Organization (JIAMDO)
- Commands: USS Higgins (DDG-76); Destroyer Squadron 23; Pacific Partnership; Carrier Strike Group 10; Naval Surface Force Atlantic
- Conflicts: Operation Enduring Freedom; Second Persian Gulf War

Rear Admiral Jesse Alphonzo Wilson Jr. (born February 29, 1964) is a retired United States Navy officer. His last active duty assignment was as commander of Naval Surface Force Atlantic.

== Biography ==
=== Education ===
Wilson graduated with a Bachelor of Science in mathematics from the United States Naval Academy in 1986. He also earned a Master of Science in operations research from the U.S. Naval Postgraduate School in Monterey, California, (1991) and a Master of Arts degree in national security and strategic studies from the Naval War College in 2001. Wilson was also a Massachusetts Institute of Technology Seminar XXI Fellow in 2007–08, and he is a graduate of the Navy Corporate Business Course at UVA-Darden.

=== Career (afloat) ===
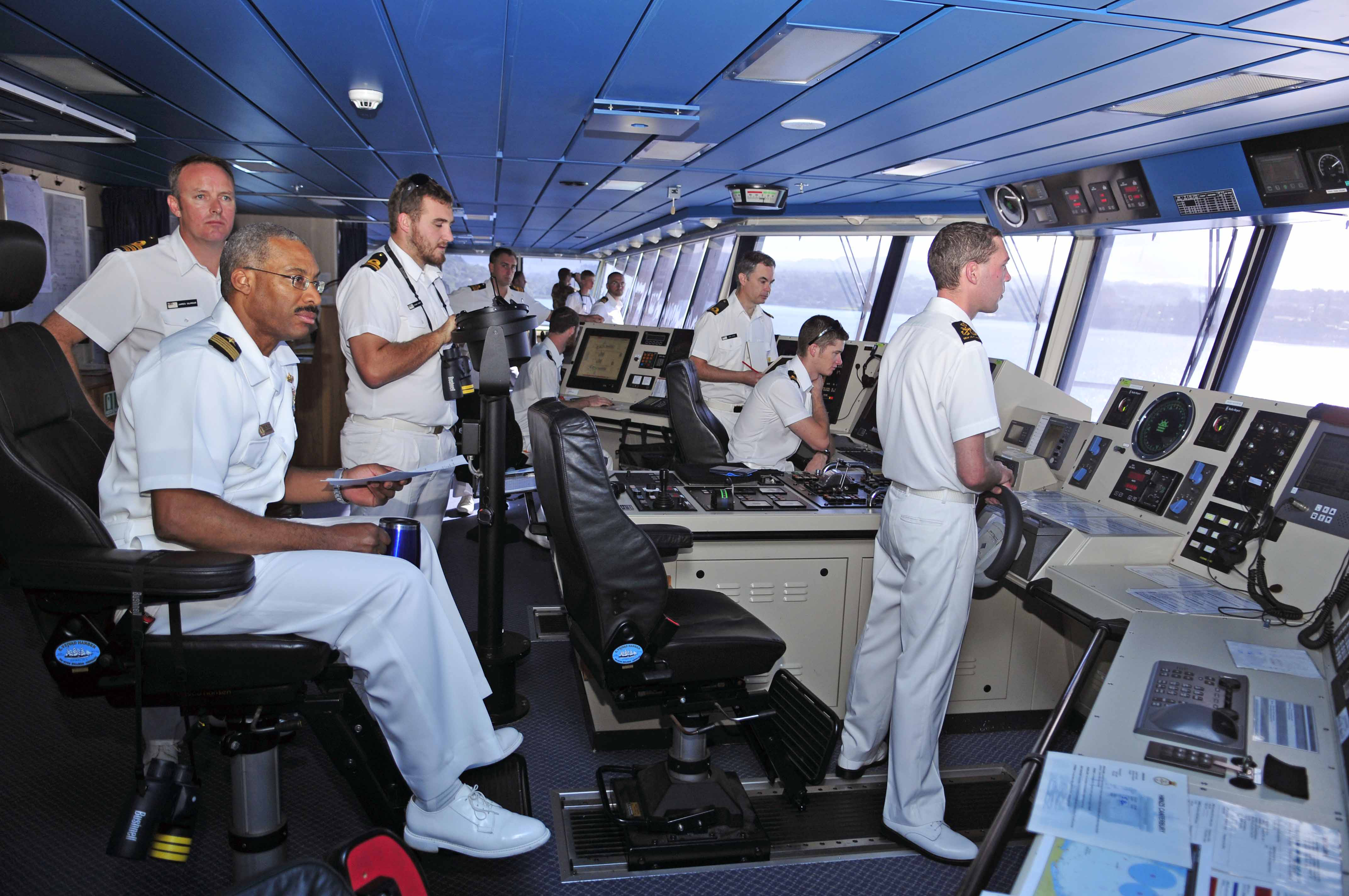
Wilson aboard HMNZS Canterbury

During his initial sea tour aboard USS Reasoner (FF-1063), he served as the main propulsion assistant and combat information center officer from January 1987 to August 1989. As a department head, he served as engineer officer aboard USS Antrim (FFG-20) from June 1992 to November 1993. As a second department head tour, he served as space examiner in the gas turbine branch of CINCLANTFLT's Propulsion Examining Board from November 1993 to November 1995. During his follow-on sea tour, he served as the executive officer aboard USS Fitzgerald (DDG-62) from April 1999 to July 2000. His first command was serving as the sixth commanding officer of USS Higgins (DDG-76) from November 2004 to November 2006, where he led Higgins during a six-month Western Pacific deployment with the USS Nimitz Carrier Strike Group as part of Operations Iraqi Freedom and Enduring Freedom. Wilson served as sea combat commander for the USS Nimitz Carrier Strike Group during the 2009–10 Western Pacific deployment.

Wilson then served as the commander of Destroyer Squadron TWO THREE (DESRON 23), also known as the Little Beavers. He assumed command in December 2010, following a line of officers starting in 1943, which included Arleigh Burke. He was also the mission commander for Pacific Partnership 2011, COMPACFLT’s annual humanitarian and civil assistance mission to Southeast Asia and Oceania.

On December 1, 2015, Wilson relieved RDML Bruce Lindsey during a change of command ceremony aboard the flagship USS Dwight D. Eisenhower (CVN-69)(IKE). The Norfolk-based strike group is composed of the aircraft carrier USS Dwight D. Eisenhower, Carrier Air Wing 3, USS San Jacinto (CG-56), USS Monterey (CG-61), and Destroyer Squadron 26 and its associated ships: USS Barry (DDG-52), USS Stout (DDG-55), USS McFaul (DDG-74), USS Oscar Austin (DDG-79), USS Mason (DDG-87) and USS Nitze (DDG-94). The strike group commander's duties are to oversee operational training and readiness for the entire group and to maintain administrative functions and material warfighting readiness support for ships and squadrons.

=== Career (ashore) ===
Wilson was assigned to the U.S. Naval Academy from December 1995 to November 1998, where he served as the 27th company officer. From June 2001 to June 2004, he served at the Pentagon on the Joint Staff, J8-Force Structure, Resources, and Assessments Division as a joint warfighting analyst. During tours at the Pentagon, he was assigned to the Campaign Analysis Branch of OPNAV N81 Assessment Division before transferring to serve two Chiefs of Naval Operations as the deputy executive assistant. other assignments include interim deputy director of the 21st century sailor office and Executive Assistant to the Chief of Naval Operations.

From June 2014 he was assigned as the director of Joint Integrated Air and Missile Defense Organization (JIAMDO), Joint Staff, J8 where he leads JIAMDO in planning, coordinating, and overseeing joint air and missile defense (AMD) requirements, operational concepts, and operational architectures. He was also the U.S. head of delegation to NATO's Air and Missile Defense Committee, helping develop and steer Alliance policy. He also served as the director, Assessments Division (N81) on the OPNAV Staff. Wilson's final assignment was as the commander, Naval Surface Force Atlantic from July 2017 to August 2019.

=== Awards and decorations ===

Defense Superior Service Medal

Legion of Merit (2 award stars)

Defense Meritorious Service Medal

Meritorious Service Medal

Navy Commendation Medal (4 award stars)

Joint Service Achievement Medal

Navy Achievement Medal (1 award star)

Office of the Joint Chiefs of Staff Identification Badge

Surface Warfare Officer
