= Conservation Drones =

Conservation organization

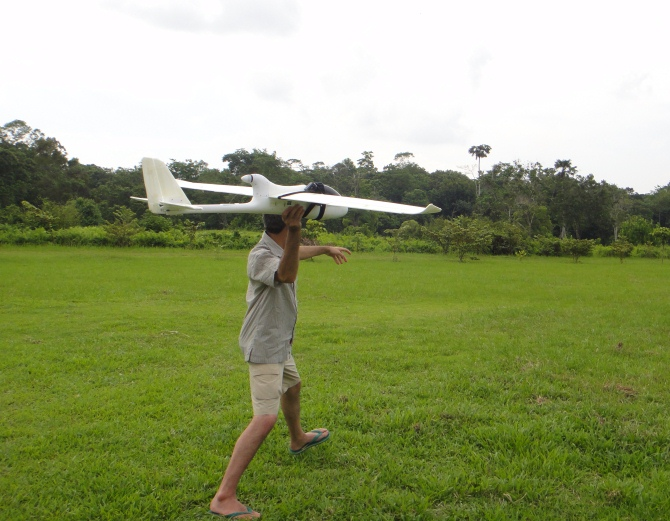
Serge Wich launching a Drone

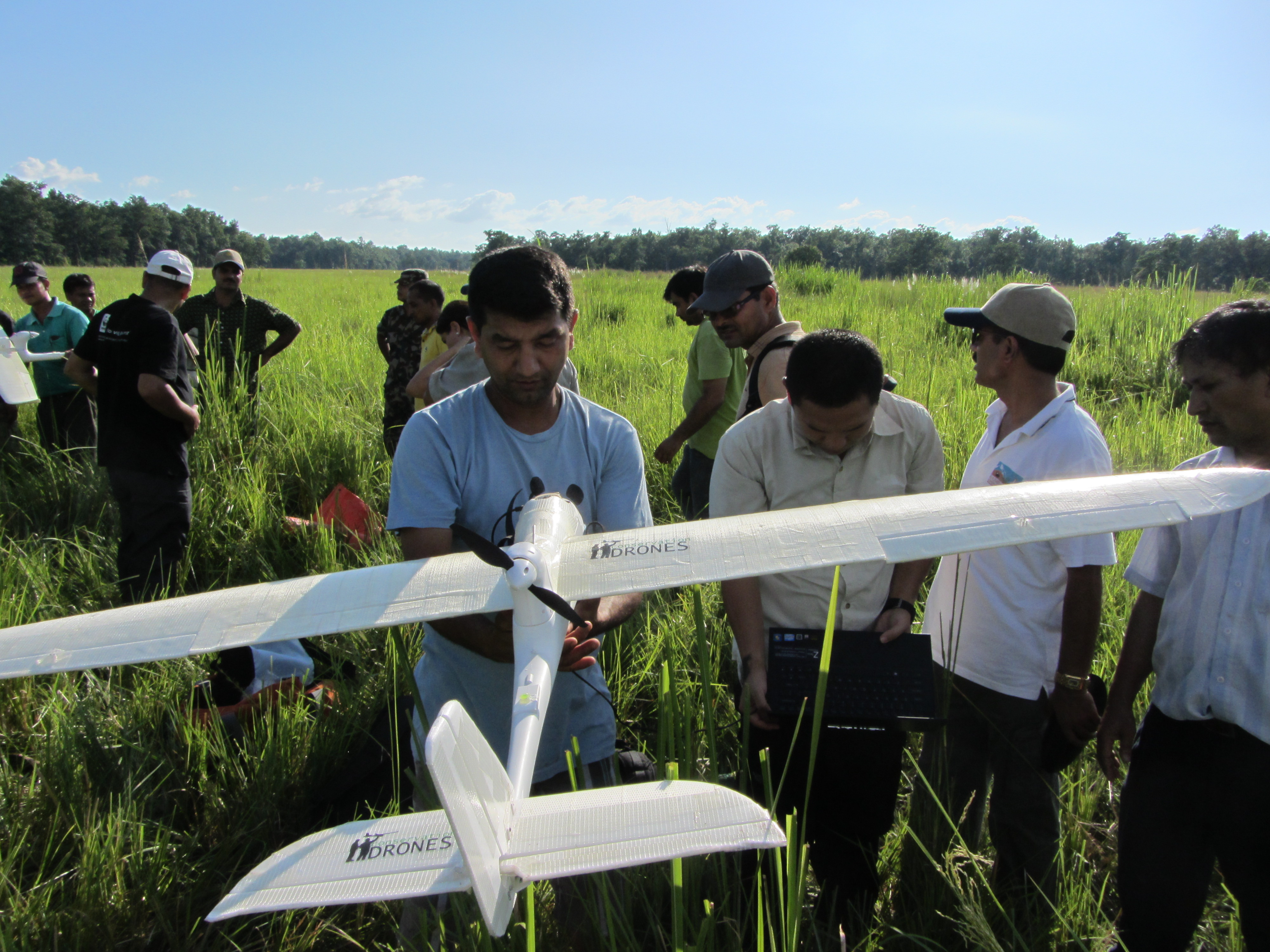
Hand launching of Conservation Drone by World Wildlife Fund

Conservation Drones is a conservation organization co-founded by Lian Pin Koh and Serge Wich to make and promote the use of unmanned aerial vehicles (UAVs) for biodiversity conservation applications. The Conservation Drone project shares their experiences of UAV building and using low cost UAVs. This Project has grown to become a worldwide initiative to raise awareness of conservation challenges in certain regions, and inspire others to adopt emerging technologies for conservation.

== Definition and terminology ==
A conservation drone, also known as an eco-drone, is an aircraft without a human pilot aboard, usually of model aircraft size. Due to falling costs and higher performance of new technology makes drones more useful for conservation applications. Conservation Drones is working with manufacturing companies to make UAVs more affordable for environmental and conservation groups. Conservation Drones can range in a variety of sizes depending on application and climate severity.

== History ==
The idea of Conservation Drones emerged in 2011, as two conservationist, Lian Pin Koh and Serge Wich met in Zurich discussing the challenges of wildlife conservation in Southeast Asia.

By 2012, They built a prototyped and did its first field test in North Sumatra, Indonesia, which lead to the co-founding of ConservationDrones.org as an open source forum on drones. A year after the co-founding of ConservationDrones.org, it became a nonprofit organization under the sponsorship of Mongabay Org Corp.

== Drone components ==
Drones are made up of a Model aircraft hard body attached would be a hardware such as autopilot, sensors, live communication, and environment adapting components. Along with the Drone hardware comes with free open source software such as mission planners, flight simulators, and geo-tagging imagery.

== Development considerations ==
Drones are used for wildlife surveying, monitoring and mapping land and marine ecosystems, supporting anti-poaching and anti-wildlife trafficking efforts, and enforcing reductions in human activities in protected areas.

=== Wildlife monitoring ===
By observing a species, you change their environment and run the risk of scaring or stressing individuals. Use of a conservation drone can allow wildlife monitoring that does not disturb wildlife, and is more efficient in covering larger distances than can be achieved on land or sea. Researchers are able to examine individual animal's health, perform population counts, observe migration routes, monitor trends in populations over time and study animal behaviour such as mating

Researchers are able to automatically examine individual animals' size (length and width), perform population counts, monitor population trends, and study population breeding such as pup numbers. Drone imagery has also been tested for non-invasive assessment of body size and condition in harbour seals.

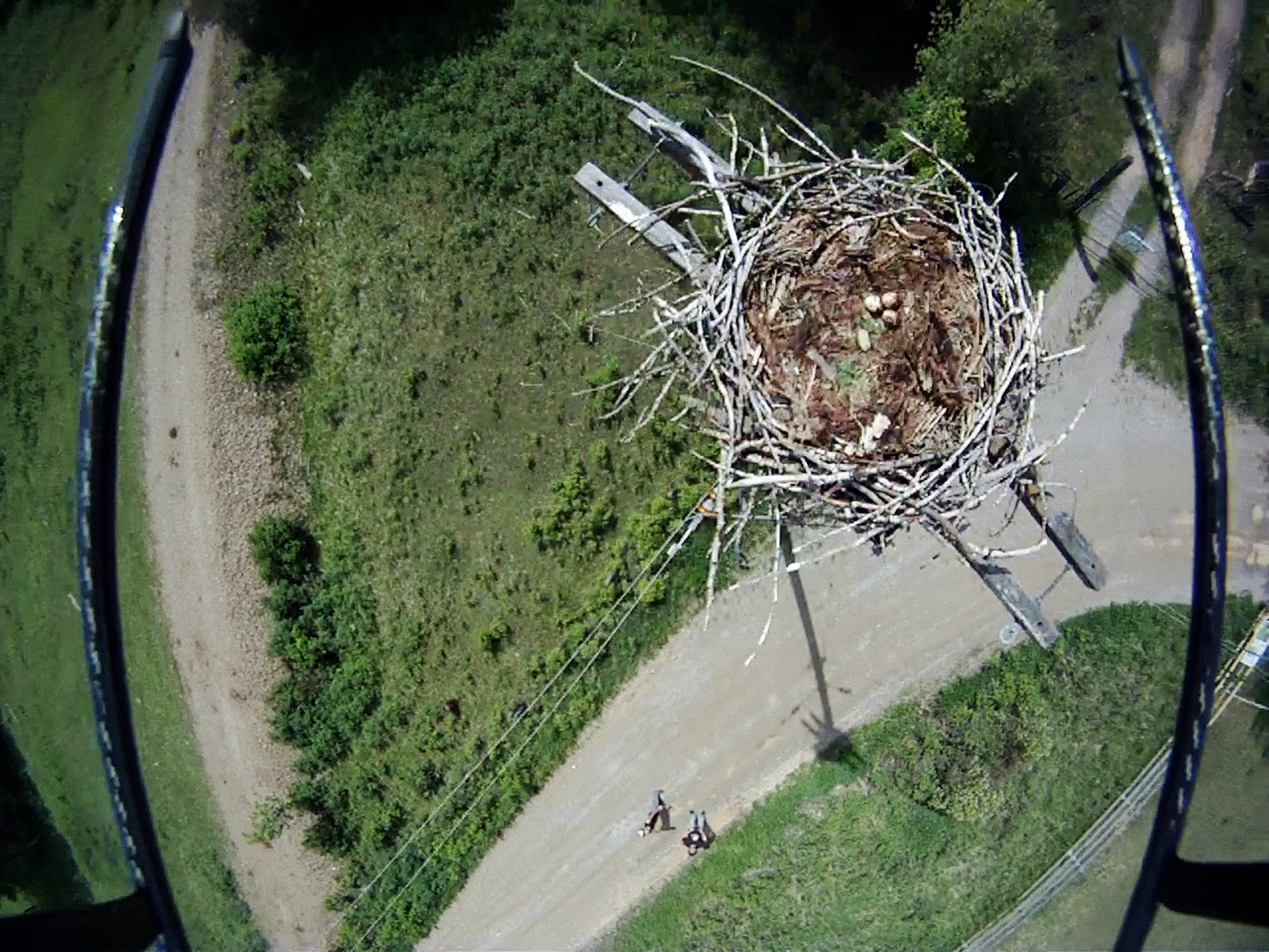
Conservation Drone monitoring an Osprey Nest

At Fort Collins Science Center in Colorado, a population count of Sandhill cranes (Grus canadensis) was accomplished in only four hours. Using a modified former military drone, the biologists counted 14,000 sandhill cranes, which would have taken many people several days to accomplish on land. With a conservation drone, it was possible to survey 30 to 50 kilometers of Colorado without missing or recounting individuals.

=== Geographic mapping ===
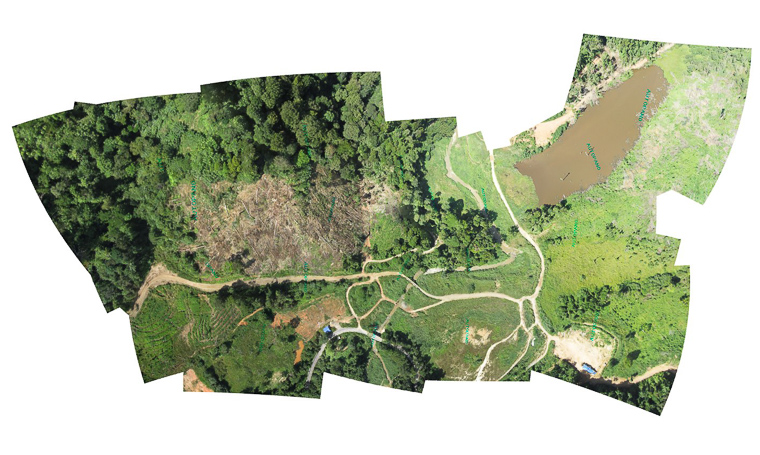
Conservation Drones using GIS software to connect images captured by drones

Aerial imagery yields interesting data with a high success rate. A geographic mapping programs captures hundreds of images combining these images into one big map. Similar to a Google Earth map, conservation drone images are more detailed, using 2 centimeters resolution/pixel. Conservation Drones can be used to map a variety of landscapes such as ocean waters, and forest and depict a timeline of ecological issues. For example, drones can monitor U.S. National Parks and wildlife safe zones and the health of their ecosystems.

Conservation Drones have had field tests in tropical forests due to the ongoing process of deforestation. These forests are home to many endangered species and helps the reduction of climate change. With the contributing factors to carbon emissions, deforestation has contributed 15% of global greenhouse gas emissions, which have disturbed global forests with rates of 13 million hectares in recent years. With the success rate of 100% from the 32 missions these Conservation Drones have endured in locating areas of deforestation, they have aided the research of climate change.

Drone imagery combined with machine learning has been used to identify dugong feeding trails, map associated seagrass beds, and assess spatial overlap with gillnet fishing activity. RGB and multispectral UAV imagery has also been used to map dugong foraging hotspots and associated seagrass beds, supporting indirect monitoring of dugong habitat use.

=== Law enforcement ===
Using thermal-imaging, drones capture heat signatures which indicates poachers and wildlife traffickers.

David Wilkie, the director of conservation measures for the Wildlife Conservation Society, stated they had deployed drones in Belize to examine illegal fishing near the vulnerable reef area.

With the use of funds from Google, the World Wildlife Fund is using different technology methods such as drones to combat poaching in Africa.

The Associated Press used a drone to observe a mission in Hluhluwe-iMfolozi to look for heat-emitting objects in shapes of similarity to a rice grain to track a team of poachers such as a tracker, shooter, and carrier all of whom are armed with a rifle and an axe to chop off the rhino's horn to later sell in the black market.

== Organizations who have adopted ==
Organizations that adopted and support the conservation drone project, as well as share information are National Geographic, World Wildlife Fund, Zoo Zurich, Dronemapper, HornbillSurveys, DIYDrones, Philly Zoo, Orangutan Conservancy, Techpod Hobby UAV, Chester Zoo, and 3DRobotics.

== Existing projects similar ==
=== OpenROV ===
A low-cost open-source remotely operated submarine with the goal of making underwater exploration affordable, similar to the efforts of conservation drone project. OpenROV provides a DIY community of amateur and professional submarine builders from all over the world.
