= Krossblade Aerospace Systems =

American aviation company

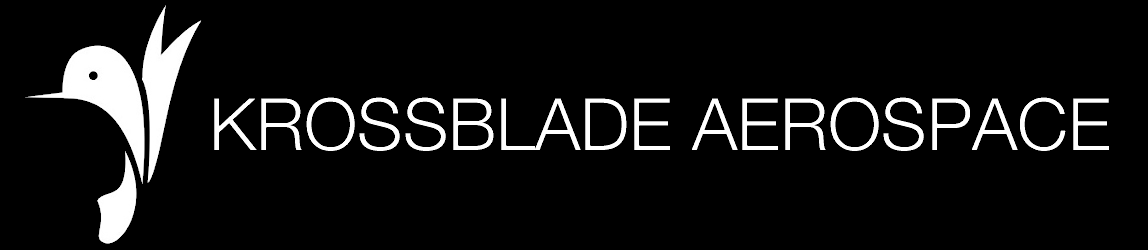
- Type: Private
- Industry: Aerospace/Aviation
- Founded: 2014
- Founder: Daniel Lubrich and Austin Kipp
- Headquarters: United States Singapore
- Area served: Global locations
- Products: SkyCruiser, SkyProwler
- Website: www.krossblade.com

Krossblade Aerospace Systems is an aviation company founded in 2014 in Phoenix Arizona, USA. The company is known for developing a 5-seat VTOL concept, SkyCruiser, hybrid vehicle for vertical take-off and landing, and for its drone/UAV prototype, named SkyProwler. Both aircraft employ the switchblade transformation mechanism to transform from a multirotor aircraft for vertical take-off and landing, to a pure winged aircraft, for rapid and efficient cruise.

== Products ==
=== Krossblade SkyCruiser ===
SkyCruiser is a concept of vertical take-off and landing transformer aircraft with limited road drive capability. It has 5 seats and is powered by a hybrid powertrain. All rotors and propellers are driven by electric motors, the electric energy is produced by a 400 hp internal combustion engine mated to a generator. A small battery provides backup storage of electric energy, enabling SkyCruiser to briefly fly on stored electric power. SkyCruiser is able to fly at speeds in excess of 300 mph with a range of around 1,000 miles. Although capable of driving on roads, SkyCruiser is optimized for flight. Fast cruise bridges larger distances rapidly, while the VTOL capability enables it to land at or very close to its passengers’ destination. SkyCruiser was scheduled to come to market at the end of the current decade (before 2020).

=== Krossblade SkyProwler ===
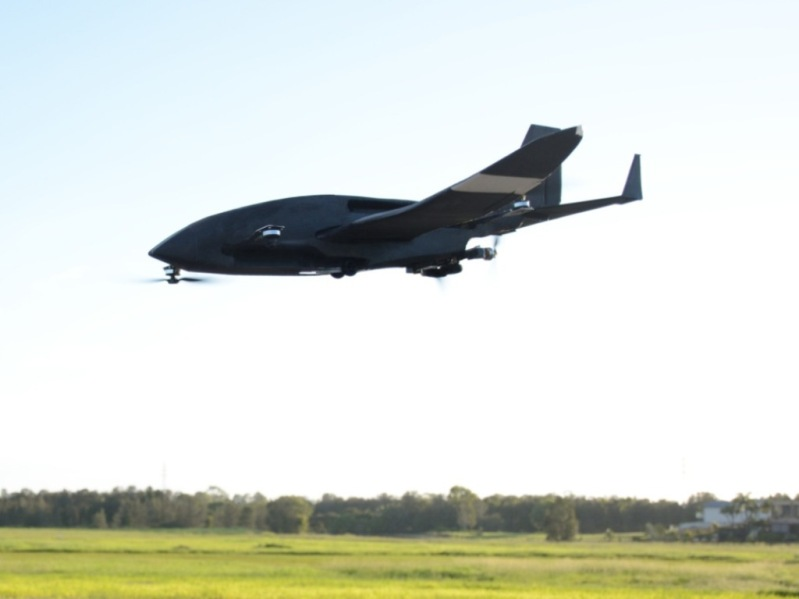
title=Krossblade SkyProwler

SkyProwler is a UAV/drone prototype used by Krossblade to develop the essential mechanisms and concepts for the larger SkyCruiser. It’s a purely electrical aircraft that utilizes the switchblade mechanism to transform from multirotor mode for VTOL to a pure aircraft mode for fast and efficient cruise. Possible applications include delivery. SkyProwler flies with speeds of up to 55 mph.

=== Krossblade SkyProwler 2 ===
SkyProwler 2 was introduced in 2019. It has the vertical take-off and landing (VTOL) ability. VTOL is facilitated by the transforming process of its arms by folding and expanding.

== Switchblade mechanism ==
Rather than employing a rigid frame to mount motors and rotors, as is done in quadcopters and other multi-rotors, the switchblade mechanism mounts motors and rotors on movable arms. These arms can pivot, enabling storage of the rotors and motors inside the fuselage, where they do not cause aerodynamic drag and hence enable aircraft to fly faster and more efficiently. Compared to a pure-winged aircraft, the VTOL system, including the switchblade mechanism, increases the weight of an aircraft by around 15%.

== See also ==
- Flying car (fiction)
- Personal air vehicle
- Comparison of personal air vehicles
- CarterCopter
- Intermodal passenger transport
- Aerocar
- Aerocar Aero-Plane
- Aerocar Coot
