= Smart Parks =

UK-based charity

- Founded: 2017
- Founder: Laurens de Groot, Jeroen de Looze, Stephen Roest, Tim van Dam
- Type: Stichting Foundation (Netherlands) Registered Charity (UK)
- Purpose: Conservation
- Location: Netherlands, UK
- Method: Advanced Technology
- Key people: Laurens de Groot, Jeroen de Looze, Tim van Dam, Steve Roest
- Website: www.smartparks.org

Smart Parks is a UK-based charity that specializes in providing aerial surveillance and monitoring services through the use of unnamed aerial vehicles (UAVs), commonly knowns as drones. The organization was founded in 2012 and launched publicly in 2013, and operates as a registered charity in the UK and a private foundation in the Netherlands. The organization was formerly named ShadowView.

Smart Park's services are used primarily by park rangers and conservationist for wildlife conservation efforts, disaster relief situations, poaching and wildlife crime, habitat destruction, and biomass management. Smart Parks has been successfully implemented in several nature reserves and national parks across the world, including the Kruger National Park in South Africa, Bardiya National Park in Nepal, and Niassa Special Reserve which is one of Africa's largest protected area. The initiative has shown promising results in improving the effectiveness of wildlife conservation efforts and protecting endangered species.

== History ==
Smart Parks was founded by four conservationist Laurens de Groot, Tim van Dam, Steve Roest, and Jeroen de Looze to address the need to support conservation organizations in their battles to protect the natural environment. They combined their 30 years of experience in law enforcement and advanced technologies to monitor and protect wildlife in remote areas.

Smart Parks was formed by the merger of two charities ShadowView and Internet of Life in 2017. In collaboration with League Against Cruel Sports, Smart Parks became the first organization to use UAV's to monitor and document potential wildlife crime in England. This effort involved using drones to fly over areas where illegal hunting may occur, and capturing video evidence that can be used in legal proceedings.

In 2017 Rwanda's Akagera National Park launched the Smart Parks technology which allows park rangers to monitor animals, visitors, and equipment in real-time. The Smart Parks system is based on the LoRa technology, a Long Range Wide-Area Network LoRaWAN with low-bandwidth, low-power networking technology that can blanket large areas at relatively low costs.

In 2018, ShadowView was rebranded as Smart Parks, expanding its focus beyond drone technology to include other advanced technologies such as camera traps and sensors.

== Operations ==
In November 2013 Smart Parks confirmed deployment of their Eco Ranger, Shadow Ranger and Shadow Rotor UAS in the Greater Kruger area for anti poaching operations.

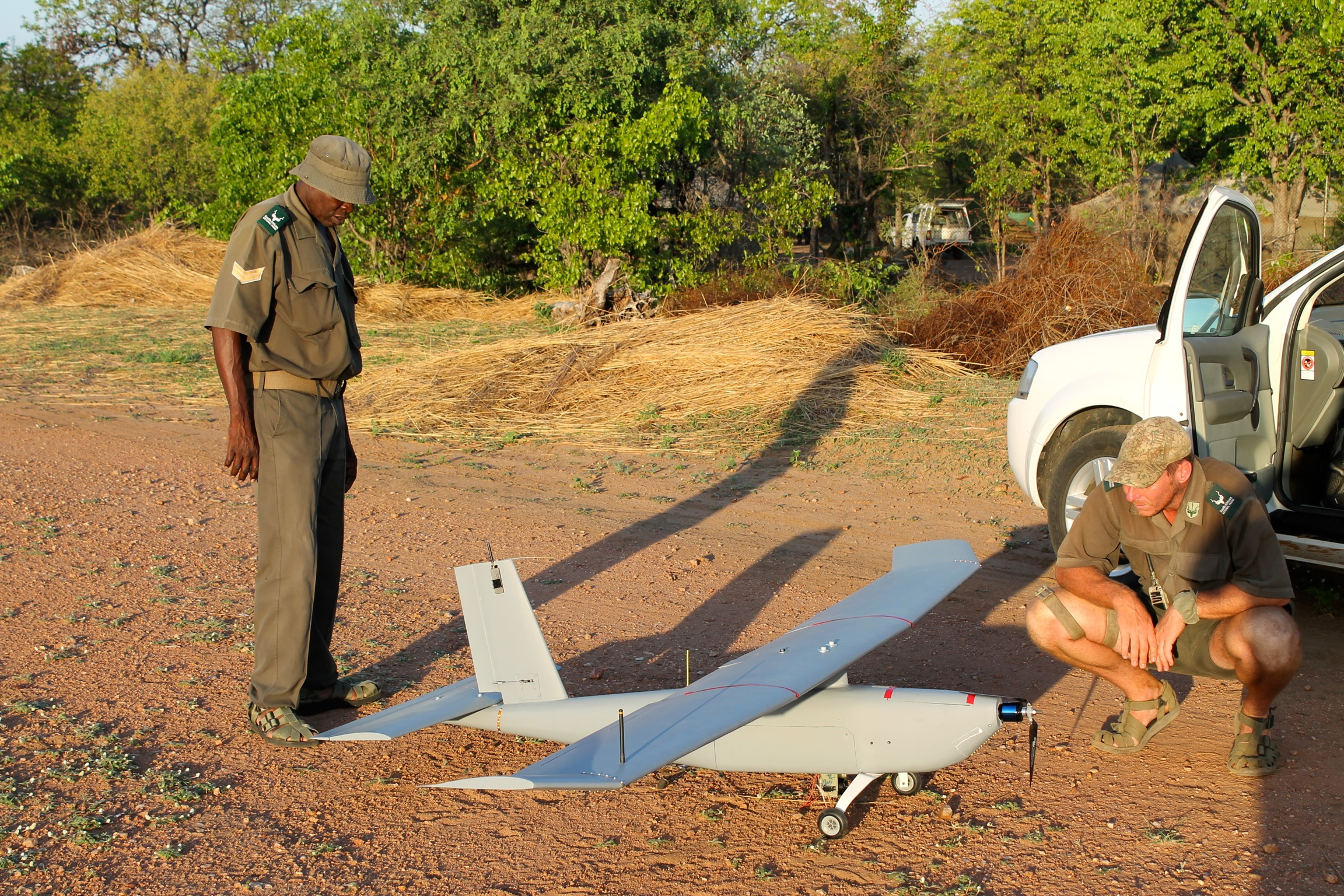
ShadowView Eco Ranger

Smart Parks continued to operate throughout 2014 in a variety of private reserves in South Africa. In January 2017 The Internet of Life and the ShadowView Foundation organizations co-developed a LoRa-equipped sensor that is implanted directly into the rhino's horn for protection against poaching in Akagera National Park. The sensor has given park rangers the ability to accurately monitor the whereabouts and activities of the critically endangered black rhinos and keep them safe from wildlife criminals and poachers. This technology is utilized by Smart Parks and is now being deployed throughout Mkomazi National Park and many other locations.

In addition, this wireless technology provides sensors that can be implemented along fences that are used to protect endangered or vulnerable species. If a break in the fence is detected or animal presence is sensed near the fence, local officials will be alerted. This provides real-time data on where potential poachers can be breaking fences to enter protected properties or when animals are near the border of the property.

Smart Parks has installed its fourth and largest African smart park to date in Malawi's Liwonde National Park in October 2018. In just two weeks, the 548km2 national park was equipped with gateways and sensors that gather information to help improve park management and protection. The construction of the network in the Liwonde National Park was implemented alongside a team from African Parks, a conservation NGO that manages the park on behalf of the Malawian government. The group was trained by Smart Parks for the construction of the site.

Smart Parks announced in 2018 an operation in the Serengeti National Park, a World Heritage Site.

== Controversy ==
There has been some controversy in the media surrounding the use of UAV or "drones" in the countryside of the UK with the Countryside Alliance suggesting the use of drones might be dangerous to people and animals Smart Parks respond to the controversy of using drones, saying they fly within CAA flight regulations for missions across the UK. In December 2013 International NGO 'Free the Slaves' announced it would partner with Smart Parks and use UAV to identify illegal slavery, the reception in India was mixed with some of the public supporting the concept and some voicing concern of the use of drones.

== Partners ==
Smart Parks has received funding and support from several organizations including, the World Wildlife Fund and the Leonardo DiCaprio Foundation. Smart Parks has partnered with a wide range of organizations including African Parks to protect local communities in Africa and collaborate with local government officials. Additional partners include Microsoft, which supports the development of the organization's conservation technology initiatives. Microsoft's AI for Earth program has also provided funding and support for Smart Parks' work on developing a real-time wildlife monitoring system. Additional partners include Save the Children, Semtech, Air Shepherd, and The Dutch Postcode Lottery.
