= Macquarie University Faculty of Science and Engineering =

Faculty of Science
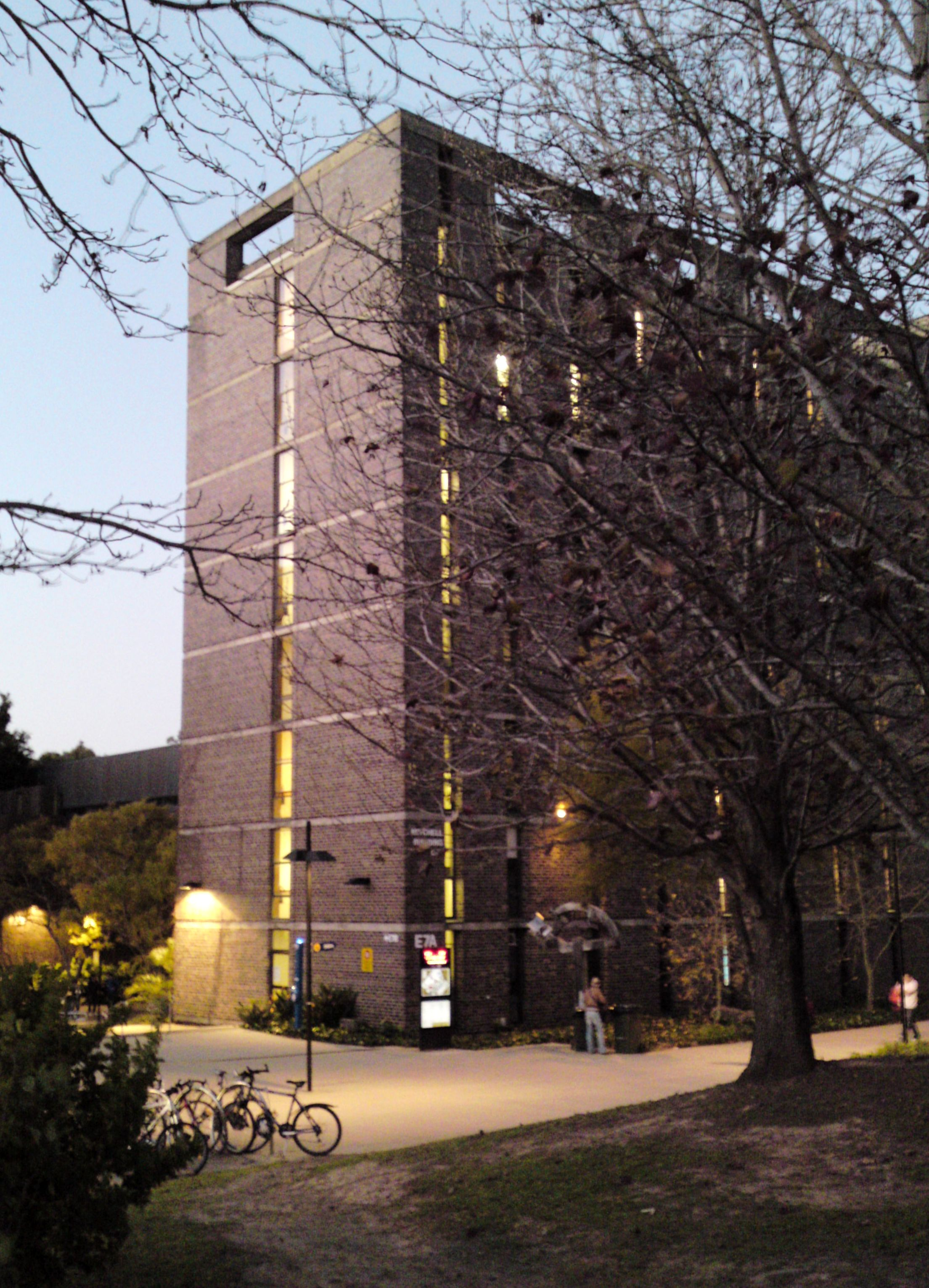
- Type: Public
- Established: 2009 - Amalgamation of various departments
- Affiliations: Macquarie University
- Students: 4,153
- Location: Sydney, New South Wales, Australia
- Campus: Urban
- Website: science.mq.edu.au

The Faculty of Science and Engineering is a constituent body of Macquarie University. The Faculty offers undergraduate and postgraduate coursework and research degree programs and is home to a number of internationally recognised research centres and also distinguished research staff. The Science Faculty is based on the Eastern half of the Academic Core at Macquarie University and is located near to the Macquarie University Research Park and the Macquarie University Hospital, thus allowing practical links with industry and research. The Faculty is renowned for its research in such areas as chiropractic science, proteomic analysis, climate risk research, environmental science and ecological studies.

== Undergraduate Study ==
The Faculty offers bachelor degrees and undergraduate diplomas as part of their undergraduate programs. The Bachelor of Science offered by the faculty is a flexible program that students can tailor to suit their needs; with 25 majors available for study.

== Postgraduate Study ==
The Faculty offers postgraduate awards in the form of master's degrees, as coursework and research degrees, doctoral studies and postgraduate diplomas or certificates. Research degrees offered to students are designed to assist students to investigate and contribute to knowledge in their chosen discipline and to develop proficiency in conducting research.

== Faculty Departments and Centres ==
The Faculty of Science is divided into separate Departments which focus on specific fields of science for research and education purposes. The Excellence in Research for Australia initiative, as part of the Australian Research Council, has recognised several departments in the Faculty for "outstanding performance well above world standard" in the fields of Earth Sciences, Physical Sciences, Environmental Sciences, Biological Sciences, and Psychology and Cognitive Sciences. Centres, also referred as Research Centres, under the Faculty of Science are at the forefront of research in the university and focus on significant and emerging fields in science.

The Faculty encompasses four schools, 2 research departments, and thirteen research centres.

=== Schools & Departments ===
- School of Computing
- School of Engineering
- School of Mathematical and Physical Sciences
- School of Natural Sciences
- Applied BioSciences
- Australian Astronomical Optics (AAO) - Macquarie

=== Centres ===
National research centres:

- ARC Centre of Excellence for Synthetic Biology (SynBio)
- Facilitated Advancement of Australia's Bioactives (FAAB)
- Risk Frontiers ("The birthplace of")

University research centres:

- Astrophysics and Space Technologies
- Data Horizons
- Smart Green Cities
- Future Communications

Faculty research centres:

- Advanced Drone Systems
- Applied Artificial Intelligence
- Future Ecosystems Research Network
- Frontier AI
- Multi-omics
- Pollinator Futures
