= Sun Yeneng =

Sun Yeneng is Goh Keng Swee Professor of Economics and Professor of Mathematics at the National University of Singapore (NUS). Sun received his B.S. from University of Science and Technology of China in 1983 and his M.S. and Ph.D. from University of Illinois at Urbana-Champaign respectively in 1985 and 1989. He joined NUS as a lecturer at the Department of Mathematics in 1989 and was promoted to professor in 2002. He was Raffles Professor of Social Sciences at the Department of Economics in NUS from 2009 to 2015.

Sun was formerly appointed as acting head and head in the Department of Economics in 2008 to 2012. He has been Dean of Faculty of Science from 1 July 2020, until he was succeeded by Koh Lian Pin in 2026.

== Research Interests ==
Sun's research interests include mathematical economics, analysis and probability theory.

== Selected works ==
- Chen, Yi-Chun; He, Wei; Li, Jiangtao; Sun, Yeneng (2019). "Equivalence of stochastic and deterministic mechanisms". Econometrica. 87 (4): 1367–1390. doi:10.3982/ECTA14698. S2CID 200061254.
- Keisler, H. Jerome; Sun, Yeneng (2009). "Why saturated probability spaces are necessary". Advances in Mathematics. 221 (5): 1584–1607. doi:10.1016/j.aim.2009.03.003.
- Duffie, Darrell; Sun, Yeneng (2007). "Existence of independent random matching". Annals of Applied Probability. 17 (1): 386–419. arXiv:math/0703034. doi:10.1214/105051606000000673.
- Sun, Yeneng (2006). "The exact law of large numbers via Fubini extension and characterization of insurable risks". Journal of Economic Theory. 126 (1): 31–69. doi:10.1016/j.jet.2004.10.005.
- Khan, M. Ali; Sun, Yeneng (2002). "Non-cooperative games with many players". Handbook of Game Theory with Economic Applications. Vol. 3. pp. 1761–1808. doi:10.1016/S1574-0005(02)03009-6. ISBN 9780444894281.
- Sun, Yeneng (1998). "The almost equivalence of pairwise and mutual independence and the duality with exchangeability". Probability Theory and Related Fields. 112 (3): 425–456. doi:10.1007/s004400050196.

== Awards and honors ==
Sun has been an Economic Theory Fellow of the Society for the Advancement of Economic Theory since 2011, and a Fellow of the Singapore National Academy of Science since 2014.
