= Joint Integrated Air and Missile Defense Organization =

- Active: 1997 to Present
- Country: United States of America
- Type: Division
- Role: Support the CJCS to coordinate development of air and missile defense capabilities
- Part of: Department of Defense; Joint Staff
- Headquarters: The Pentagon
- Nickname: JIAMDO
- Mottos: Solutiones Communes Nam Lentus Obstaculum "Joint Solutions to Difficult Problems"

Commanders
- Director: Brig Gen Roy Collins, USAF
- Deputy Director: COL Chris Efaw, USA
- Technical Director: Jeffrey C. Boulware, PhD

The Joint Integrated Air and Missile Defense Organization (JIAMDO) supports the CJCS, through the Director Joint Staff J-8, in their responsibilities to coordinate development of air and missile defense capabilities. JIAMDO facilitates collaboration between Services, CCMDs, and agencies to identify existing and emerging capabilities and will foster innovation and integration through support to simulations, technology demonstrations, and RDT&E projects. JIAMDO's roles include:

- Representing Joint Force IAMD required capabilities and gaps within the requirements, acquisition, and PPBE processes
- Assessing IAMD capabilities through studies, simulations, technology demonstrations, and other test and evaluation programs
- Identifying and developing IAMD operational concepts and Joint requirements for system interoperability
