= Starlit =

Starlit may refer to:

- Starlit (brand), a contemporary womenswear label

== See also ==
- Starlight, the light of stars
- Starlight (disambiguation)
- Starlite (disambiguation)
