= Stardust =

Stardust may refer to:

- A type of cosmic dust, composed of particles in space

== Entertainment ==
=== Music ===
- Stardust (band), a 1990s French house music supergroup

==== Albums ====
- Stardust (Danny Brown album), 2025
- Stardust (Ron Carter album), 2001
- Stardust (Natalie Cole album), 1996
- Stardust (John Coltrane album), 1963
- Stardust (Benny Golson album), 1987
- Stardust (Lena album), 2012
- Stardust (Willie Nelson album), 1978
- Stardust: The Great American Songbook, Volume III, by Rod Stewart, 2004
- Star Dust (Bing Crosby album), 1940
- Star Dust (Pat Boone album), 1958
- Stardust (mixtape), by Yung Lean, 2022
- Stardust, an EP by The8 of Seventeen, 2024
- Stardust (EP), an EP by Freya Skye, 2025

==== Songs ====
- “Stardust” (1927 song), by Hoagy Carmichael
- “Stardust” (David Essex song), 1974
- “Stardust” (Lena Meyer-Landrut song), 2012
- “Stardust” (Mika song), 2012
- 'Stardust' (composition), by Jean-Michel Jarre and Armin van Buuren, 2015
- “Stardust”, by Carly Simon from Come Upstairs, 1980
- “Stardust”, by Officium Triste from Ne Vivam, 1997
- “Stardust”, by The Caretaker from We'll All Go Riding on a Rainbow, 2003
- “Stardust”, by Galneryus from Reincarnation, 2008
- “Stardust”, by Amaranthe from The Nexus, 2013
- “Stardust”, by Gemini Syndrome from Lux, 2013
- “Stardust”, by Xandria from Sacrificium, 2014
- “Stardust”, by Delain from The Human Contradiction, 2014
- “Stardust”, by IAMX from Alive In New Light, 2018
- “Stardust”, by Myrath from Shehili, 2019
- “Stardust”, by Neon Dreams, 2023
- “Stardust”, by Obscura from A Sonication, 2025

=== Books and comics ===
- Star Dust (poetry collection), a 2005 collection of poetry by Frank Bidart
- Stardust, a 1952 novel by Kathleen Lindsay under the pen name Molly Waring
- Stardust, a 1974 novel by William Bayer
- Stardust, a novelization of the 1974 film by Ray Connolly
- Stardust, a 1982 novel by Anne Hampson
- Stardust, a 1983 novel by Parris Afton Bonds
- Stardust, a 1988 novel by Nan Ryan
- Stardust (Parker novel), a 1990 novel by Robert Parker
- Stardust, a 1992 novel by Charlotte Bingham
- Stardust, a 1993 novel by Alane Ferguson
- Stardust, a 1995 novel by Roumelia Lane
- Stardust (Gaiman novel), a 1998 fantasy novel by Neil Gaiman
- Stardust, a 2001 short story collection edited by Julie E. Czerneda, the first installment in the Tales from the Wonder Zone series
- Stardust, a 2004–2008 YA novel series by Linda Chapman
- Stardust (Serafin book), a 2007 posthumous collection of memoirs and essays by Bruce Serafin
- Stardust, a 2009 novel by Joseph Kanon
- Stardust: The Ruby Castle Stories, a 2013 short story collection by Nina Allan
- Stardust (Marvel Comics), a character first appearing in 2005
- Stardust the Super Wizard, a Fox Comics superhero first appearing in 1939

=== Film, theater and television ===
- Star Dust (film), a 1940 comedy drama directed by Walter Lang
- Stardust (1974 film), a British musical drama directed by Michael Apted
- "Star Dust", Robotech season 2, episode 10 (1985)
- "Stardust", Captain Planet and the Planeteers season 2, episode 14 (1992)
- "Stardust", Space: Above and Beyond episode 20 (1996)
- "Stardust", Operation Good Guys series 2, episode 2 (1999)
- "Stardust", High Hopes (British TV series) series 2, episode 4 (2003)
- Stardust (miniseries), a 2006 Irish miniseries
- "Stardust", SantApprentice episode 15
- Stardust (2007 film), a British and American romantic fantasy adapted from the Neil Gaiman novel
- "Stardust", Paradise Falls season 3, episode 2 (2008)
- "Stardust", Wonders of the Universe episode 2 (2011)
- "Stardust", The Bold Type season 4, episode 8 (2020)
- Stardust (2020 film), a Canadian–British biographical drama about David Bowie
- "Stardust", Jee Karda episode 7 (2023)
- "Stardust", Kizazi Moto: Generation Fire episode 8 (2023)

=== Other entertainment ===
- Stardust (magazine), an Indian Bollywood magazine published in English and Hindi
- Stardust (1993 video game), an Asteroids-like game, initially for the Amiga
- Star Dust (1987 video game), a top-scrolling shooter released by Kixx in 1987
- Timeless (radio network), originally called Stardust
- Stardust (T'urin G'ar), a fictional character in Marvel comics

== People ==
- Stardust, one of the ring names for professional wrestler Cody Rhodes (born 1985)
- Mercury Stardust (born 1987), American educator, TikToker, and activist
- Ziggy Stardust (character), the onstage persona of musician David Bowie (1947–2016) in the 1970s.

== Places ==
- Stardust, Dublin, Ireland; a nightclub, the site of the 1981 Stardust fire
- Stardust Resort and Casino, a former casino resort in Las Vegas, Nevada, USA

== Other uses ==
- Stardust (spacecraft), a NASA mission to investigate the comet Wild 2
- Star Dust (aircraft), a British airliner that disappeared in 1947
- Stardust fire, a 1981 fire in the Stardust nightclub in Dublin
- Stardust project, EU research on space junk and asteroids
- Stardust@home, a citizen science project
- Stardust Solutions, for-profit climate geoengineering start-up company

== See also ==
- Stardust (comics)
- Starduster (disambiguation)
- Starlight (disambiguation)
- Space dust (disambiguation)
