= Starlite (disambiguation) =

Starlite is a thermal insulate material.

Starlite or Star Lite may also refer to:

== Military ==
- Operation Starlite or Battle of Van Tuong, a 1966 battle in the U.S.–Vietnam War
- STARLite Radar, a U.S. Army radar system

== Music ==
- Starlite Festival, an international music festival in Marbella, Spain
- Starlite Music Theatre a former theater in Latham, New York, U.S.
- Starlite Orchestra, Mandacy Entertainment's inhouse musicians
- Starlite Records, a UK record label
- "Starlite", a 2006 song by Panacea from Ink Is My Drink
- "Starlite", a 2012 song by Paul Weller from Sonik Kicks

== Transport ==
- Nu-Klea Starlite, an electric car by Nu-Klea
- Starlite Ferries, a ferry company in the Philippines
- Star-Lite Aircraft, a U.S. aircraft manufacturer
- StarLite Engineering, a U.S. company producing the StarLite Warp

== Other uses ==
- Starlite (video game), 2009 multiplayer online game
- Star Lite Motel, a historic motel in Dilworth, Minnesota, U.S.
- STAR-LITE, an astrophysics experiment aboard U.S. Space Shuttle flight STS-95
- Samsung Galaxy A9 Star Lite, a smartphone in the Samsung Galaxy A series

== People with the name ==
- Francis Farewell Starlite (born 1981) U.S. musician
- Starlite Lotulelei Jr. (born 1989) U.S. American football player

== See also ==
- "Detroit Star-Lite", a song by Sarge from "Distant"
- Starlight, the light of stars
- Starlight (disambiguation)
- Staurolite, a prismatic crystalline mineral
- Steatite, a ceramic mineral
