= List of aircraft manufacturers by ICAO name =

This article lists aircraft manufacturers by ICAO name. The International Civil Aviation Organization (ICAO) uses a naming convention for aircraft manufacturers in order to be specific when mentioning an aircraft manufacturer's name. This article lists aircraft manufacturers by the name that ICAO recognises them by. The list also contains the aircraft manufacturers full name and the name of the country they operate from.

The first item on the list is 3XTRIM and the last is ZLIN.

== 0–9 ==
- 3XTRIM – Zaklady Lotnicze 3Xtrim Sp z oo (Poland)

== A ==
- AAC – AAC Amphibian Airplanes of Canada
- AAMSA – Aeronautica Agricola Mexicana SA
- AASI – Advanced Aerodynamics and Structures Inc
- ABHCO – Arab British Helicopter Company (Egypt)
- ABS – ABS Aircraft (Germany); ABS Aircraft AG (Switzerland)
- ACBA – Aéro Club de Bas Armagnac (France)
- ACE – Ace Aircraft Manufacturing and Supply (United States); Ace Aircraft Manufacturing Company (United States); Ace Aircraft Manufacturing Inc (United States)
- ACEAIR – Aceair SA (Switzerland)
- ACES HIGH – Aces High Light Aircraft Ltd (Canada)
- ACRO SPORT – Acro Sport Inc (United States)
- AD AEROSPACE – AD Aerospace Ltd (United Kingdom)
- ADA – Aeronautical Development Agency (India)
- ADAM (1) – Roger Adam (France)
- ADAM (2) – Adam Aircraft Industries LLC (United States)
- ADAMS – Adams Industries Inc (United States)
- ADVANCED AEROMARINE – Advanced Aeromarine (United States)
- ADVANCED AIRCRAFT – Advanced Aircraft Corporation (United States)
- ADVANCED AVIATION – Advanced Aviation Inc (United States)
- ADVENTURE AIR – Adventure Air (United States)
- AEA – Aeronautical Engineers Australia Research Pty Ltd (Australia)
- AERFER – Aerfer-Industrie Aerospaziali Meridionali SpA (Italy); Aerfer-Industrie Meccaniche Aeronautiche Meridionali SpA (Italy)
- AERFER-AERMACCHI – see AERFER and AERMACCHI
- AERITALIA – Aeritalia-Società Aerospaziale Italiana pa
- AERITALIA-AERMACCHI – see AERITALIA and AERMACCHI
- AERMACCHI – Aermacchi SpA (Italy); Aeronautica Macchi Spa (Italy)
- AERO (1) – Aero Design and Engineering Company (United States)
- AERO (2) – Aero Vodochody AS (Czech Republic); Aero Vodochody Národní Podnik (Czech Republic)
- AERO (3) – Aero Sp z oo (Poland)
- AERO ADVENTURE – Aero Adventure Inc (United States)
- AERO BOERO – Aero Boero SA (Argentina); Aero Boero SRL (Argentina); Aero Talleres Boero SRL (Argentina)
- AERO COMMANDER – Aero Commander Inc (United States)
- AERO DESIGNS – Aero Designs Inc (United States)
- AERO GARE – Aero Gare (United States)
- AERO JAEN – Aeronautica de Jaen (Spain)
- AERO KUHLMANN – Aero Kuhlmann (France)
- AERO MERCANTIL – Aero Mercantil SA (Colombia)
- AERO MIRAGE – Aero Mirage Inc (United States)
- AERO MOD – Aero Mod General (United States)
- AERO SPACELINES – Aero Spacelines Inc (United States)
- AEROBRAVO – Aerobravo Indústria Aeronáutica Ltda. (Brazil)
- AEROCAD – AeroCad Inc (United States)
- AEROCAR – Aerocar Inc (United States)
- AEROCOMP – Aerocomp Inc (United States)
- AERO-COMPOSITES – Aero-Composites Technologies Inc (United States)
- AERO-DIFUSION – Aero-"Diffusión SL (Spain)
- AERODIS – Aérodis SARL (France)
- AERO-JODEL – Aero Flugzeugbau Hubert Zuerl (Germany)
- AEROKOPTER – OOO Aerokopter (Ukraine)
- AEROLITES – Aerolites Inc (United States)
- AEROMERE – Aeromere SpA (Italy)
- AEROMOT – Aeromot Indústria Mecânico-Metalúrgica Ltda. (Brazil); Aeronaves e Motores SA (Brazil)
- AERONCA – Aeronautical Corporation of America (United States); – Aeronca Manufacturing Corporation (United States)
- AEROPLASTIKA – Aeroplastika (Lithuania)
- AEROPRACT – Aeropract JSC (Russia); KB Aeropract (Russia); LM Aeropract Samara (Russia); OKB Aeroprakt (Russia)
- AEROPRAKT – Aeroprakt Firma (Ukraine); Aeroprakt ooo (Ukraine)
- AEROPRO – Aeropro sro (Slovakia)
- AEROPROGRESS – Aeroprogress Corporation (Russia)
- AERORIC – Aeroric Nauchno-Proizvodstvennoye Predpriyatie OOO (Russia)
- AEROSPATIALE – Aerospatiale Matra SA (France); Société Nationale Industrielle Aerospatiale (France)
- AEROSPOOL – Aerospool spol sro (Slovakia)
- AEROSPORT – Aerosport Inc (United States)
- AEROSTAR (1) – Aerostar Aircraft Corporation (United States)
- AEROSTAR (2) – SC Aerostar SA (Romania)
- AEROSTRUCTURE – Aérostructure SARL (France)
- AEROSTYLE – Aerostyle GmbH (Germany)
- AEROTEC – Aerotec S.A. Indústria Aeronáutica (Brazil)
- AEROTECHNIK – Aerotechnik CZ SRO (Czech Republic)
- AEROTEK (1) – Aerotek Inc (United States)
- AEROTEK (2) – Aeronautical Systems Technology (South Africa)
- AERO-VOLGA – NPO Aero-Volga (Russia)
- AESL – Aero Engine Services Ltd (New Zealand)
- AFIC – AFIC Pty Ltd (South Africa)
- AG-CAT – Ag-Cat Corporation (United States)
- AGRO-COPTEROS – Agro-Copteros Ltda (Colombia)
- AGROLOT – Fundacja Agrolot (Poland); Wyposazen Agrolotniczych (Poland)
- AGUSTA – Agusta SpA (Italy); Agusta, Division of Leonardo (Italy); Costruzioni Aeronautiche Giovanni Agusta SpA (Italy)
- AGUSTAWESTLAND – AgustaWestland International Ltd (United Kingdom/Italy) > Leonardo
- AI(R) – Aero International (Regional) (UK/France/Italy)
- AIAA – Atelier Industriel de l'Aéronautique d'Alger (Algeria)
- AICSA – Aero Industrial Colombiana S.A. (Colombia)
- AIDC – Aerospace Industrial Development Corporation (Republic of China-Taiwan); Aero Industry Development Center (Republic of China-Taiwan)
- AIEP – Aeronautical Industrial Engineering and Project Management Company Ltd (Nigeria)
- AII – Aviation Industries of Iran (Iran)
- AIL – Aeronautics (India) Ltd (India)
- AIR – Aircraft Investor Resources LLC (United States)
- AIRBOT SYSTEMS - Drones (France)
- AIR & SPACE – Air & Space America Inc (United States); Air & Space Manufacturing Inc (United States)
- AIR COMMAND – Air Command International Inc (United States)
- AIR PARTS – Air Parts (NZ) Ltd (New Zealand)
- AIR PRODUCTS – Air Products Company Inc (United States)
- AIR TRACTOR – Air Tractor Inc (United States)
- AIRBUS – Airbus SAS (France/Germany/UK/Spain); GIE Airbus Industrie (France/Germany/UK/Spain)
- AIRCONCEPT – Airconcept Flugzeug und Gerätebau GmbH und Co KG (Germany)
- AIRCRAFT DESIGNS – Aircraft Designs Inc (United States)
- AIRCRAFT HYDRO-FORMING – Aircraft Hydro-Forming Inc (United States)
- AIRCRAFT PARTS – Aircraft Parts and Development Corporation (United States)
- AIRCRAFT SPRUCE – Aircraft Spruce & Specialty Company (United States)
- AIRCRAFT TECHNOLOGIES – Aircraft Technologies Inc (United States)
- AIR-FOUGA – Air-Fouga (France)
- AIRMASTER – Airmaster Inc (United States)
- AIRTECH (1) – Airtech Canada Aviation Services Ltd (Canada)
- AIRTECH (2) – Aircraft Technology Industries (Indonesia/Spain)
- AISA – Aeronáutica Industrial S.A. (Spain)
- AJEP – AJEP Developments (United Kingdom)
- AJI – American Jet Industries Inc (United States)
- AKAFLIEG BERLIN – Akademische Fliegergruppe Berlin eV (Germany)
- AKAFLIEG DARMSTADT – Akademische Fliegergruppe Darmstadt eV (Germany)
- AKAFLIEG KARLSRUHE – Akademische Fliegergruppe Karlsruhe eV (Germany)
- AKAFLIEG MUNCHEN – Akademische Fliegergruppe München eV (Germany)
- AKRON – Akron Aircraft Company Inc (United States)
- AKROTECH – Akrotech Aviation Inc (United States)
- AKROTECH EUROPE – Akrotech Europe SA (France)
- ALANNE – Pentti Alanne (Finland)
- ALENIA – Alenia (Italy); Alenia Aerospazio, Division of Leonardo-Finmeccanica (Italy)
- ALFA-M – Alfa-M Nauchno-Proizvodstvennoye Predpriyatie AOOT (Russia)
- ALLISON – Allison Gas Turbine Division GMC (United States)
- ALON – Alon Inc (United States)
- ALPAVIA – Alpavia SA (France); Société Alpavia (France)
- ALPHA – Alpha (Poland)
- ALPI – Alpi Aviation Srl (Italy)
- ALPLA – Alpla-Werke Alwin Lechner OHG (Austria)
- ALTAIR COELHO – Altair Coelho (Brazil)
- ALTURAIR – Alturair (United States)
- ALVAREZ – Joseph P.Alvarez (United States)
- AMAX – Amax Engineering (Australia)
- AMBROSINI – Societa Aeronautica Italiana Ing.A.Ambrosini & Companie (Italy)
- AMC – Aircraft Manufacturing Company (United States)
- AMD – Aircraft Manufacturing and Development Company Inc (United States)
- AMEAGLE – AmEagle Corporation (United States)
- AMERICAN – American Aviation Corporation (United States)
- AMERICAN AFFORDABLE – American Affordable Aircraft (United States)
- AMERICAN AIRCRAFT – American Aircraft Inc (United States)
- AMERICAN AUTOGYRO – American Autogyro Inc (United States)
- AMERICAN CHAMPION – American Champion Aircraft Corporation (United States)
- AMERICAN EAGLE – American Eagle Aircraft Corporation (United States)
- AMERICAN GENERAL – American General Aircraft Company (United States)
- AMERICAN HOMEBUILTS – American Homebuilts' Inc (United States)
- AMERICAN SPORTSCOPTER – American Sportscopter Inc (United States)
- AMEUR – Ameur Aviation SA (France); Ameur Aviation Technologie (France)
- AMS-FLIGHT – AMS-Flight DOO (Slovenia)
- AMX – AMX International Ltd (Italy/Brazil)
- ANAHUAC – Fabrica de Aviones Anahuac SA (Mexico)
- ANDERSON – Anderson Aircraft Corporation (United States); Earl Anderson (United States)
- ANDERSON-GREENWOOD – Anderson, Greenwood and Company (United States)
- ANDREASSON – Björn Andreasson (Sweden)
- ANGEL – Angel Aircraft Corporation (United States)
- ANGLIN – Anglin Engineering (United States); Anglin Special Aero Planes Inc (United States)
- ANGLO NORMANDY – Anglo Normandy Aero Engineering (United Kingdom)
- ANTONIEWSKI – Tomek Antoniewski (Poland)
- ANTONOV – Antonov OKB (Ukraine); Aviatsionny Nauchno-Tekhnichesky Kompleks Imeni O K Antonova (Ukraine)
- AOI – Arab Organisation for Industrialisation, Aircraft Factory (Egypt)
- APPLEBAY – Applebay Inc (United States)
- APPLEGATE & WEYANT – Applegate & Weyant (United States)
- APPLIED AERONAUTICS – Applied Aeronautics, LLC (United States)
- AQUILA – Aquila Technische Entwicklungen GmbH (Germany)
- ARADO – Arado Flugzeugwerke GmbH (Germany)
- ARC ATLANTIQUE – Arc Atlantique Aviation (France)
- ARCTIC – Arctic Aircraft Company (United States)
- ARDC – Air Force Research and Development Center (Philippines)
- ARMSTRONG WHITWORTH – Sir W.G.Armstrong Whitworth Aircraft Ltd (United Kingdom)
- ARNET PEREYRA – Arnet Pereyra Aero Design (United States)
- ARROW (1) – Arrow Airplane & Motors Corporation (United States)
- ARROW (2) – Arrow Aircraft Company (Canada)
- ARV – ARV Aviation Ltd (United Kingdom)
- ASCO - Asco group (Belgium)
- ASAP – Aircraft Sales & Parts (Canada)
- ASL – ASL Hagfors Aero AB (Sweden)
- ASSO AEREI – Asso Aerei Srl (Italy)
- ASSOCIATED AIR – Associated Air (United States)
- ASTA – Aerospace Technologies of Australia Pty Ltd (Australia)
- ATLAS – Atlas Aircraft Corporation of South Africa (Pty) Ltd (South Africa); Atlas Aviation (Pty) Ltd (South Africa); Atlas Aviation, Division of Denel (Pty) Ltd (South Africa)
- ATR – GIE Avions de Transport Régional (France/Italy)
- AUSTER – Auster Aircraft Ltd (United Kingdom)
- AUSTFLIGHT – Austflight ULA Pty Ltd (Australia)
- AUSTRALITE – Australite Inc (United States)
- AVCRAFT – AvCraft Aviation LLC (United States)
- AVIA (1) – Azionari Vercellese Industrie Aeronautiche (Italy)
- AVIA (2) – Avia-Zavody Jirího Dimitrova (Czech Republic)
- AVIA (3) – Nauchno-Proizvodstvennoe Obedinenie Avia (Russia)
- AVIA BALTIKA – Avia Baltika Aviation Ltd (Lithuania)
- AVIABELLANCA – AviaBellanca Aircraft Corporation (United States)
- AVIAMILANO – Aviamilano Costruzioni Aeronautiche SRL (Italy)
- AVIASTROITEL – AviaStroitel Ltd (Russia)
- AVIAT – Aviat Aircraft Inc (United States); Aviat Inc (United States)
- AVIATIKA – Aviatika JSC (Russia); Kontsern Aviatika (Russia)
- AVIATION DEVELOPMENT – Aviation Development International Ltd (United States)
- AVIATION FARM – Aviation Farm Ltd (Poland)
- AVIATION SCOTLAND – Aviation Scotland Ltd (United Kingdom)
- AVIATION TRADERS – Aviation Traders (Engineering) Ltd (United Kingdom)
- AVIATON – Aviaton Nauchno-Proizvodstvennaya Aviatsionnaya Firma (Russia)
- AVIAD-DESIGN CONSTRUCTION LIGHT AIRCRAFT (Italy Spain)
- AVID – Avid Aircraft Inc (United States)
- AVIOANE – SC Avioane SA (Romania)
- AVIONES COLOMBIA – Aviones de Colombia SA (Colombia)
- AVIONS FAIREY – Avions Fairey SA (Belgium); Fairey SA (Belgium)
- AVIOTECHNICA – Aviotechnica Ltd (Bulgaria/Russia)
- AVIPRO – AviPro Aircraft Ltd (United States)
- AVRO – A.V.Roe & Company (United Kingdom); A.V.Roe & Company Ltd (United Kingdom); Avro International Aerospace Ltd (United Kingdom)
- AVTEK – Avtek Corporation (United States)
- AYRES – Ayres Corporation (United States)

== B ==
- B & F TECHNIK – B & F Technik Vertriebs GmbH (Germany)
- BAC – British Aircraft Corporation Ltd (United Kingdom)
- BACAU – Intreprinderea de Avioane Bacau (Romania)
- BAE SYSTEMS – BAE Systems PLC (United Kingdom)
- BAE SYSTEMS AUSTRALIA – BAE Systems Australia Ltd (Australia)
- BAKENG – Bakeng Aircraft (United States); Gerald Bakeng (United States)
- BARNETT – Barnett Rotorcraft (United States)
- BARR – Barr Aircraft (United States)
- BASLER – Basler Turbo Conversions Inc (United States)
- BD-MICRO – BD-Micro Technologies Inc (United States)
- BEACHNER – Chris Beachner (United States)
- BEAGLE – Beagle Aircraft (1969) Ltd (United Kingdom); Beagle Aircraft Ltd (United Kingdom)
- BEAGLE-AUSTER – Beagle-Auster Ltd (United Kingdom)
- BEDE – BD Micro Technologies Inc (United States); Bede Aircraft Corporation (United States); Bede Aircraft Inc (United States); Bede Aviation Corporation (United States); Bede Jet Corporation (United States); BEDEAmerica Aerosport LLC (United States)
- BEECH – Beech Aircraft Corporation (United States)
- BEECH-SFERMA – see BEECH and SFERMA
- BEETS – Glenn Beets (United States)
- BEIJING KEYUAN – Beijing Keyuan Light Aircraft Industrial Company Ltd (China)
- BEL-AIRE – Bel-Aire Aviation (United States)
- BELL – Bell Aircraft Corporation (United States); Bell Helicopter Company, Division of Bell Aerospace Corporation (United States); Bell Helicopter Textron Inc (United States); Bell Helicopter Textron, Division of Textron Canada Ltd (Canada); Bell Helicopter Textron, Division of Textron Inc (United States)
- BELL-AGUSTA – Bell-Agusta Aerospace Company (United States/Italy)
- BELLANCA – Bellanca Aircraft Corporation (United States); Bellanca Aircraft Engineering (United States); Bellanca Inc (United States); Bellanca Sales Manufacturing Inc (United States)
- BELL-BOEING – see BELL and BOEING
- BENGIS – Bengis Aircraft Company (Pty) Ltd (South Africa)
- BERIEV – Beriev OKB (Russia); Berieva Aviatsionnyi Kompaniya (Russia); Taganrogsky Aviatsionnyi Nauchno-Tekhnicheskiy Kompleks Imeni G.M.Berieva (Russia)
- BERKUT – Berkut Engineering Inc (United States)
- BEST OFF – Best Off (France)
- BHARAT – Bharat Heavy Electricals Ltd (India)
- BILLIE – Billie Aero Marine (France)
- BINDER – Binder Aviatik KG (Germany)
- BITZ – Bitz Flugzeugbau GmbH (Germany); Fa. Josef Bitz (Germany)
- BLACKBURN – Blackburn Aircraft Ltd (United Kingdom)
- BLERIOT – Société Blériot Aéronautique (France)
- BLUE YONDER – Blue Yonder Aviation Inc (Canada)
- B-N GROUP – B-N Group Ltd (United Kingdom)
- BOEING – Boeing Aircraft Company (United States); The Boeing Airplane Company (United States); The Boeing Company (United States)
- BOEING CANADA – Boeing Aircraft of Canada Ltd (Canada)
- BOEING VERTOL – Boeing Vertol Company (United States)
- BOEING-SIKORSKY – see BOEING and SIKORSKY
- BOEVE – Boeve Fiberglass Components Inc (United States)
- BOISAVIA – Société Boisavia (France)
- BOLKOW – Bölkow-Apparatebau GmbH (Germany); Bölkow-Entwicklungen GmbH (Germany)
- BOMBARDIER – Bombardier Aerospace (Canada)
- BOWERS – Peter M.Bowers (United States)
- BRADLEY – Bradley Aerospace (United States)
- BRANDLI – Max Brändli (Switzerland)
- BRANTLY – Brantly Helicopter Corporation (United States); Brantly Helicopter Industries USA Company Ltd (United States); Brantly International Inc (Helicopter Division) (United States)
- BRANTLY-HYNES – Brantly-Hynes Helicopter Inc (United States)
- BRDITSCHKA – H.W.Brditschka OHG (Austria); HB-Brditschka GmbH & Co KG (Austria)
- BREDANARDI – BredaNardi Costruzione Aeronautiche SpA (Italy)
- BREGUET – Société des Ateliers d'Aviation Louis Bréguet (France)
- BRIAN ALLEN – Brian Allen Aviation (United Kingdom)
- BRISTOL – Bristol Aircraft Ltd (United Kingdom); The Bristol Aeroplane Company Ltd (United Kingdom)
- BRITISH AEROSPACE – British Aerospace (United Kingdom); British Aerospace PLC (United Kingdom)
- BRITTEN-NORMAN – Britten-Norman (Bembridge) Ltd (United Kingdom); Britten-Norman Ltd (United Kingdom)
- BROKAW – Brokaw Aviation Inc (United States)
- BROOKLANDS – Brooklands Aerospace Ltd (United Kingdom); Brooklands Aircraft Ltd (United Kingdom)
- BUCHANAN – Buchanan Aircraft Corporation Ltd (Australia)
- BUCKER – Bücker Flugzeugbau GmbH (Germany)
- BUCKER PRADO – Bücker Prado SL (Spain)
- BUCURESTI – Intreprinderea de Avioane Bucuresti (Romania)
- BUETHE – Buethe Enterprises Inc (United States)
- BUHL – Buhl Aircraft Company (United States)
- BUL – Bourgogne Ultra Léger Aviation (France)
- BUSHBY – Bushby Aircraft Inc (United States)

== C ==
- CAARP – Cooperatives des Ateliers Aéronautiques de la Région Parisienne (France)
- CAB – Constructions Aéronautiques du Béarn (France)
- CABLE-PRICE – Cable-Price Corporation (New Zealand)
- CABRINHA – Cabrinha Aircraft Corporation (United States); Cabrinha Engineering Inc (United States)
- CAG – Construcciones Aeronáuticas de Galicia (Spain)
- CALLAIR – Call Aircraft Company (United States); Callair Inc (United States)
- CALUMET – Calumet Motorsports Inc (United States)
- CAMAIR – Camair Aircraft Corporation (United States); Camair Division of Cameron Iron Works Inc (United States)
- CAMERON – Cameron & Sons Aircraft (United States)
- CAMPANA – Campana Aviation (France)
- CANADA AIR RV – Canada Air RV Inc (Canada)
- CANADAIR – Bombardier Aerospace Canadair (Canada); Canadair Group of Bombardier Inc (Canada); Canadair Inc (Canada); Canadair Ltd (Canada)
- CANADIAN HOME ROTORS – Canadian Home Rotors Inc (Canada)
- CANADIAN VICKERS – Canadian Vickers Ltd (Canada)
- CAP AVIATION – CAP Aviation (France)
- CAPELLA – Capella Aircraft Corporation (United States)
- CAPRONI VIZZOLA – Caproni Vizzola Costruzione Aeronautiche SpA (Italy)
- CARLSON – Carlson Aircraft Inc (United States)
- CARRIOU – Louis Carriou (France)
- CARTERCOPTERS – CarterCopters LLC (United States)
- CASA – Construcciones Aeronáuticas SA (Spain); EADS CASA (Spain)
- CASSUTT – Thomas K.Cassutt (United States)
- CATA – Construction Aéronautique de Technologie Avancée (France)
- CAUDRON – Caudron (France)
- CCF – Canadian Car & Foundry Company Ltd (Canada)
- CEI – CEI (United States)
- CELAIR – Celair (Pty) Ltd (South Africa)
- CENTRE EST – Centre Est Aéronautique (France)
- CENTURY – Century Aircraft Corporation (United States)
- CERVA – Consortium Européen de Réalisation et de Vente d'Avions GIE (France)
- CESSNA – Cessna Aircraft Company (United States)
- CFM – CFM Aircraft Ltd (United Kingdom); Cook Flying Machines, CFM Metal Fax Ltd (United Kingdom)
- CHALARD – Jacques et Renée Chalard (France)
- CHAMPION – Champion Aircraft Company Inc (United States); Champion Aircraft Corporation (United States)
- CHANCE VOUGHT – Chance Vought Aircraft Inc (United States); Chance Vought Corporation (United States)
- CHANGHE – Changhe Aircraft Factory (China); Changhe Aircraft Industries Corporation (China); Changhe Aircraft Manufacturing Corporation (China)
- CHASLE – Yves Chasle (France)
- CHAYAIR – Chayair Manufacturing and Aviation (South Africa)
- CHENGDU – Chengdu Aircraft Industrial Corporation (China)*
- CHERNOV – Opytnyi Konstruktorskoye Byuro Chernov B & M OOO (Russia)
- CHICHESTER-MILES – Chichester-Miles Consultants Ltd (United Kingdom)
- CHILTON – Chilton Aircraft (United Kingdom)
- CHINCUL – Chincul SACAIFI (Argentina)
- CHRIS TENA – Chris Tena Aircraft Association (United States)
- CHRISTEN – Christen Industries Inc (United States)
- CIRCA – Circa Reproductions (Canada)
- CIRRUS – Cirrus Design Corporation (United States)
- CLAASSEN – Claassen (United States)
- CLASS – Canadian Light Aircraft Sales and Services Inc (Canada)
- CLASSIC – Classic Aircraft Corporation (United States)
- CLASSIC FIGHTER – Classic Fighter Industries Inc (United States)
- CLASSIC SPORT – Classic Sport Aircraft (United States)
- CLAUDIUS DORNIER – Claudius Dornier Seastar GmbH & Co KG (Germany)
- CLIFFORD AEROWORKS – Clifford Aeroworks (United States)
- CNIAR – Centrul National al Industriei Aeronautice Române (Romania)
- COBELAVIA – Compagnie Belge d'Aviation (Belgium)
- COBRA – Cobra Aviation (Australia)
- COLEMILL – Colemill Enterprises Inc (United States)
- COLLINS – Collins Aero (United States)
- COLOMBAN – Michel Colomban (France)
- COLONIAL – Colonial Aircraft Corporation (United States)
- COMMANDER – Commander Aircraft Company (United States)
- COMMONWEALTH (1) – Commonwealth Aircraft Corporation Pty Ltd (Australia)
- COMMONWEALTH (2) – Commonwealth Aircraft Corporation Inc (United States)
- CONAIR – Conair Aviation Ltd (Canada)
- CONROY – Conroy Aircraft Corporation (United States)
- CONSOLIDATED – Consolidated Aircraft Corporation (United States)
- CONTINENTAL COPTERS – Continental Copters Inc (United States)
- CONVAIR – Consolidated-Vultee Aircraft Corporation (United States); Convair Division of General Dynamics Corporation (United States)
- COOPAVIA-MENAVIA – see COOPAVIA and MENAVIA
- CORBEN – Corben Aircraft Company (United States)
- CORBY – John C.Corby (Australia)
- COSY – Cosy Europe (Germany)
- COUNTRY AIR – Country Air Inc (United States)
- COUPE – Coupé-Aviation (France)
- CO-Z – Co-Z Development Corporation (United States); Co-Z Europa (Germany)
- CRAE – CRAE Elettromeccanica SpA (Italy)
- CRAIOVA – Intreprinderea de Avioane Craiova (Romania)
- CRANFIELD – Cranfield Institute of Technology, College of Aeronautics (United Kingdom)
- CREATIVE FLIGHT – Creative Flight Inc (Canada)
- CROSES – Emilien Croses (France)
- CSS – Centralne Studium Samolotów (Poland)
- CTRM – Composites Technology Research Malaysia Sdn Bhd (Malaysia)
- CUB – Cub Aircraft Company (Canada)
- CUB CRAFTERS – Cub Crafters Inc (United States)
- CULP – Culps Specialties (United States)
- CULVER – Culver Aircraft Company (United States)
- CURTISS – Curtiss-Wright Corporation (United States)
- CUSTOM FLIGHT – Custom Flight Components Ltd (Canada)
- CVJETKOVIC – Anton Cvjetkovic (United States)
- CZAW – Czech Aircraft Works SRO (Czech Republic)

== D ==
- DAC – Dutch Aeroplane Company VOF (Netherlands)
- DAEWOO – Daewoo Heavy Industries Company Ltd (South Korea)
- DALLACH – WD Flugzeugleichtbau GmbH (Germany)
- DAMOURE-FABRE – Damoure et Fabre (France)
- D'APUZZO – Nicholas E.D'Apuzzo (United States)
- DART – Dart Aircraft Company (United States)
- DASA – Daimler-Benz Aerospace AG (Germany); DaimlerChrysler Aerospace AG (Germany); Deutsche Aerospace AG (Germany)
- DASA-ROCKWELL – see DASA and ROCKWELL
- DASSAULT – Avions Marcel Dassault (France); Dassault Aviation (France)
- DASSAULT-BREGUET – Avions Marcel Dassault, Bréguet Aviation (France)
- DASSAULT-BREGUET/DORNIER – see DASSAULT-BREGUET and DORNIER
- DATWYLER – MDC Max Dätwyler AG (Switzerland)
- DAVIS – Leeon D.Davis (United States)
- DE HAVILLAND – The De Havilland Aircraft Company Ltd (United Kingdom)
- DE HAVILLAND AUSTRALIA – The De Havilland Aircraft Company Pty Ltd (Australia)
- DE HAVILLAND CANADA – Bombardier Aerospace De Havilland (Canada); De Havilland Division of Boeing of Canada Ltd (Canada); De Havilland Inc (Canada); The De Havilland Aircraft of Canada Ltd (Canada)
- DE SCHELDE – Koninklijke Maatschappij De Schelde (Netherlands)
- DEBORDE-ROLLAND – Yves Deborde et Jean-Louis Rolland (France)
- DELISLE – Club Aeronautique Delisle Inc (Canada)
- DENEL – Denel Aviation (South Africa)
- DENIZE – Robert Denize (France)
- DENNEY – Denney Aerocraft Company (United States)
- DERAZONA – PT Derazona Aviation Industry (Indonesia)
- DERRINGER – Derringer Aircraft Company LLC (United States)
- DEWOITINE – Constructions Aéronautiques Emile Dewoitine (France); Société Aéronautique Française, Avions Dewoitine (France)
- DF HELICOPTERS – DF Helicopters SRL (Italy)
- DG FLUGZEUGBAU – DG Flugzeugbau GmbH (Germany)
- DIAMOND – Diamond Aircraft Industries GmbH (Austria); Diamond Aircraft Industries Inc (Canada)
- DICKEY – Shirl Dickey Enterprises (United States)
- DICK, KERR & CO. – (United Kingdom)
- DIJKMAN-DULKES – Cor Dijkman-Dulkes (Netherlands)
- DINFIA – Dirección Nacional de Investigaciones y Fabricaciones Aeronáuticas (Argentina)
- DIRGANTARA – PT Dirgantara Indonesia (Indonesia)
- DM AEROSPACE – DM Aerospace Ltd (United Kingdom)
- DORNA – H F Dorna Company (Iran)
- DORNIER – AG für Dornier-Flugzeuge (Switzerland); Dornier GmbH (Germany); Dornier Luftfahrt GmbH (Germany); Dornier-Werke GmbH (Germany)
- DOUGLAS – Douglas Aircraft Company Inc (United States)
- DOWNER – Downer Aircraft Industries Inc (United States)
- DRAGON FLY – Dragon Fly Srl (Italy)
- DREAM – Dream Aircraft Inc (Canada)
- DRIGGS – Driggs Aircraft Corporation (United States)
- DRUINE – Avions Roger Druine (France)
- DUBNA – Proizvodstvenno-Tekhnichesky Kompleks Dubnenskogo Mashinostroitelnogo Zavod AO (Russia)
- DURAND – William H.Durand (United States)
- DURUBLE – Roland Duruble (France)
- DYKE – John W.Dyke (United States)
- DYN'AERO – Société Dyn'Aero (France)

== E ==
- E & K – E & K Sp z oo (Poland)
- EAA – Experimental Aircraft Association Inc (United States)
- EAC – Etudes Aéronautiques & Commerciales SARL (France)
- EAGLE – Eagle Aircraft Company (United States)
- EAGLE AIRCRAFT – Eagle Aircraft Australia Ltd (Australia); Eagle Aircraft International (Australia); Eagle Aircraft Pty Ltd (Australia)
- EARLY BIRD – Early Bird Aircraft Company (United States)o
- ECLIPSE – Eclipse Aviation Corporation (United States)
- ECTOR – Ector Aircraft Company (United States)
- EDGAR PERCIVAL – Edgar Percival Aircraft Ltd (United Kingdom)
- EDGLEY – Edgley Aircraft Ltd (United Kingdom)
- EDRA – EDRA Aeronáutica (Brazil); EDRA Helicentro Peças e Manutençao (Brazil)
- EHI – EH Industries Ltd (United Kingdom/Italy)
- EICH – James P.Eich (United States)
- EIRI – Eiriavion OY (Finland)
- EIS – EIS Aircraft GmbH (Germany)
- EKOLOT – Ekolot (Poland)
- EKW – Eidgenössische Konstruktions Werkstätte (Switzerland)
- ELA AVIACION – ELA Aviación SL (Spain)
- ELBIT – Elbit Systems Ltd (Israel)
- ELITAR – Ehlitar OOO (Russia)
- ELMWOOD – Elmwood Aviation (Canada)
- EMAIR – Emair Inc (United States); Emair, Division of Emroth Company (United States)
- EMBRAER – Empresa Brasileira de Aeronáutica SA (Brazil)
- EMBRAER-FMA – see EMBRAER and FMA
- EMROTH – Emroth Company (United States)
- ENAER – Empresa Nacional de Aeronáutica (Chile)
- ENGLISH ELECTRIC – English Electric Aviation Ltd (United Kingdom); English Electric Company Ltd (United Kingdom)
- ENSTROM – R.J.Enstrom Corporation (United States); The Enstrom Helicopter Corporation (United States)
- EPERVIER – Epervier Aviation SA (Belgium)
- ERCO – Engineering and Research Corporation (United States)
- ERPALS – Erpals Industrie, Etudes et Réalisations de Prototypes pour l'Aviation Légère et Sportive (France)
- ETHIOPIAN AIRLINES – Ethiopian Airlines Enterprise (Ethiopia); Ethiopian Airlines SC (Ethiopia)
- EUROCOPTER – Eurocopter Canada Ltd (Canada); Eurocopter GIE (France/Germany); Eurocopter SA (France/Germany); Eurocopter SAS (France/Germany)
- EUROCOPTER-KAWASAKI – see EUROCOPTER and KAWASAKI
- EURO-ENAER – Euro-Enaer Holding BV (Netherlands)
- EUROFIGHTER – Eurofighter Jagdflugzeug GmbH (Germany/UK/Italy/Spain)
- EURONEF – Euronef SA (Belgium)
- EUROPA AVIATION – Europa Aviation Ltd (United Kingdom)
- EUROSPACE – Eurospace Costruzioni Srl (Italy)
- EVANGEL – Evangel Aircraft Corporation (United States)
- EVANS – Evans Aircraft (United States); W.Samuel Evans (United States)
- EVEKTOR-AEROTECHNIK – Evektor-Aerotechnik AS (Czech Republic)
- EXCALIBUR – Excalibur Aviation Company (United States)
- EXCLUSIVE – Exclusive Aviation (United States)
- EXPERIMENTAL AVIATION – Experimental Aviation Inc (United States)
- EXPLORER (1) – Explorer Aviation (United States)
- EXPLORER (2) – Explorer Aircraft Inc (United States)
- EXPRESS – Express Aircraft Company LLC (United States); Express Design Inc (United States)
- EXTRA – Extra Flugzeugbau GmbH (Germany); Extra Flugzeugproduktions- und Vertriebs- GmbH (Germany)

== F ==
- F+W EMMEN – Eidgenössisches Flugzeugwerk-Fabrique Fédérale d'Avions-Fabbrica Federale d'Aeroplani (Switzerland)
- FAIRCHILD (1) – Fairchild Aircraft Corporation (United States); Fairchild Aircraft Inc (United States); Fairchild Aviation Corporation (United States); Fairchild Engine & Airplane Corporation (United States); Fairchild Industries Inc (United States); Fairchild Stratos Corporation (United States)
- FAIRCHILD (2) – Fairchild Aircraft Ltd (Canada)
- FAIRCHILD DORNIER – Fairchild Aerospace Corporation (United States/Germany)
- FAIRCHILD HILLER – Fairchild Hiller Corporation (United States)
- FAIRCHILD SWEARINGEN – Fairchild Swearingen Corporation (United States)
- FAIREY – Fairey Aviation Company Ltd (United Kingdom)
- FAIRTRAVEL – Fairtravel Ltd (United Kingdom)
- FAJR – Fajr Aviation and Composites Industry (Iran)
- FALCONAR – Falconar Air Engineering (Canada); Falconar Aircraft Ltd (Canada); Falconar Avia Inc (Canada)
- FARIGOUX – Georges Farigoux (France)
- FARRINGTON – Farrington Aircraft Corporation (United States)
- FEUGRAY – G.Feugray (France)
- FFA – FFA Flugzeugwerke Altenrhein AG (Switzerland); Flug und Fahrzeugwerke AG (Switzerland)
- FFT – Gesellschaft für Flugzeug- und Faserverbund Technologie (Germany)
- FIAT – Fiat SpA (Italy)
- FIESELER – Fieseler Flugzeugbau (Germany); Gerhard Fieseler Werke GmbH (Germany)
- FIGHTER ESCORT WINGS – Fighter Escort Wings (United States)
- FIKE – William J. Fike (United States)
- FINAVITEC – Patria Finavitec OY (Finland)
- FISHER – Fisher Flying Products Inc (United States)
- FISHER AERO – Fisher Aero Corporation (United States)
- FLAGLOR – K.Flaglor (United States)
- FLAIR – Flair Aviation Company (United States)
- FLÄMING AIR – Fläming Air GmbH (Germany)
- FLEET – Fleet Aircraft Inc (United States); Fleet Aircraft Ltd (Canada); Fleet Manufacturing & Aircraft Ltd (Canada); Fleet Manufacturing Ltd (Canada)
- FLETCHER – Fletcher Aviation Company (United States); Fletcher Aviation Corporation (United States)
- FLIGHT DESIGN – Flight Design GmbH (Germany)
- FLIGHT ENGINEERS – Flight Engineers Ltd (New Zealand)
- FLIGHTWORKS – Flightworks Corporation (United States)
- FLITZER – Flitzer Aero Publishing Company (United States)
- FLS – FLS Aerospace (Lovaux) Ltd (United Kingdom)
- FLSZ – Flight Level Six-Zero Inc (United States)
- FLUG WERK – Flug Werk GmbH (Germany)
- FLYER – Flyer Indústria Aeronáutica Ltda. (Brazil)
- FMA – Fábrica Militar de Aviones (Argentina); Fábrica Militar de Aviones SA (Argentina)
- FOCKE-WULF – Focke-Wulf Flugzeugbau AG (Germany); Focke-Wulf GmbH (Germany)
- FOKKER – Fokker BV (Netherlands); Fokker-VFW BV (Netherlands); NV Koninklijke Nederlandsche Vliegtuigenfabriek Fokker (Netherlands); NV Koninklijke Nederlandse Vliegtuigenfabriek Fokker (Netherlands)
- FOLLAND – Folland Aircraft Ltd (United Kingdom)
- FORNAIRE – Fornaire Aircraft Company (United States)
- FORNEY – Forney Aircraft Manufacturing Company (United States)
- FOUGA – Etablissements Fouga et Cie (France)
- FOUND – Found Aircraft Canada Inc (Canada); Found Brothers Aviation Ltd (Canada)
- FOUR WINDS – Four Winds Aircraft LLC (United States)
- FOURNIER – Avions Fournier SA (France); Bureau d'Etudes Fournier (France); Fournier Aviation (France); René Fournier (France)
- FRAKES – Frakes Aviation Inc (United States)
- FREE SPIRIT – Free Spirit Aircraft Company Inc (United States)
- FREEDOM MASTER – Freedom Master Corporation (United States)
- FREEWING – Freewing Aerial Robotics Corporation (United States)
- FRONTIER – Frontier Aircraft Inc (United States)
- FRY – Fry Aircraft Design (Switzerland)
- FUJI – Fuji Heavy Industries Ltd (Japan); Fuji Jukogyo K.K. (Japan)
- FUNK – Funk Aircraft Company (United States)

== G ==
- GAF – Government Aircraft Factories (Australia)
- GANNET – Gannet Aircraft (United States)
- GANZAVIA – Ganzavia Kft (Hungary)
- GARDAN – Avions Yves Gardan (France); Yves Gardan (France)
- GARLAND – The Garland Aircraft Company (United Kingdom)
- GARRISON – Peter Garrison (United States)
- GATARD – Avions A.Gatard (France); Société des Avions Statoplan, A.Gatard (France)
- GATES LEARJET – Gates Learjet Corporation (United States)
- GAVILAN – El Gavilán SA (Colombia)
- GENERAL AIRCRAFT – General Aircraft Corporation (United States)
- GENERAL AVIA – General Avia Costruzioni Aeronautiche SRL (Italy)
- GENERAL DYNAMICS – General Dynamics Corporation (United States)
- GENERAL MOTORS – Eastern Aircraft Division of General Motors Corporation (United States)
- GERMAN BIANCO – German Bianco SA, Fabrica Argentina de Aerodinos (Argentina)
- GILES – Richard Giles (United States)
- GIPPSLAND – Gippsland Aeronautics Pty Ltd (Australia)
- GLASER-DIRKS – Glaser-Dirks Flugzeugbau GmbH (Germany)
- GLASS – Glass Aircraft de Colombia (Colombia)
- GLASSIC – Glassic Composites LLC (United States)
- GLOBAL – Global Helicopter Technology Inc (United States)
- GLOBE – Globe Aircraft Corporation (United States)
- GLOSTER – Gloster Aircraft Company Ltd (United Kingdom)
- GOAIR – Goair Products (Australia)
- GOLDEN CIRCLE – Golden Circle Air Inc (United States)
- GOMOLZIG – Herbert Gomolzig Ingenieurbüro (Germany)
- GOODYEAR – Goodyear Aircraft Corporation (United States)
- GREAT LAKES – Great Lakes Aircraft Company Inc (United States); Great Lakes Aircraft Corporation (United States); Great Lakes Aircraft Inc (United States)
- GREAT PLAINS – Great Plains Aircraft Supply Company Inc (United States)
- GREGA – John W.Grega (United States)
- GRIFFON – Griffon Aerospace Inc (United States)
- GRINVALDS – Jean Grinvalds (France)
- GROB – Burkhart Grob Flugzeugbau GmbH & Co KG (Germany); Burkhart Grob Luft- und Raumfahrt GmbH & Co KG (Germany)
- GROEN – Groen Brothers Aviation Inc (United States)
- GROSSO – Grosso Aircraft Inc (United States)
- GROVE – Grove Aircraft Company (United States)
- GRUMMAN – Grumman Aircraft Engineering Corporation (United States); Grumman Corporation (United States)
- GRUMMAN AMERICAN – Grumman American Aviation Corporation (United States)
- GUIZHOU – Guizhou Aviation Industrial Corporation (China)
- GULFSTREAM AEROSPACE – Gulfstream Aerospace Corporation (United States)
- GULFSTREAM AMERICAN – Gulfstream American Corporation (United States)
- GYROFLUG – Gyroflug Ingenieursgesellschaft mbH (Germany)

== H ==
- HAGGLUND – Hägglund & Söner (Sweden)
- HAINZ – Franz Hainz (Germany)
- HAL – Hindustan Aeronautics Ltd (India)
- HALBERSTADT – Halberstädter Flugzeug-Werke GmbH (Germany)
- HALSTED – Barry Halsted (United States)
- HAMILTON – Hamilton Aircraft Company Inc (United States); Hamilton Aviation (United States)
- HANDLEY PAGE – Handley Page (Reading) Ltd (United Kingdom); Handley Page Ltd (United Kingdom)
- HAPI – HAPI Engines Inc (United States)
- HARBIN – Harbin Aircraft Manufacturing Corporation (China)
- HARBIN EMBRAER – Harbin Embraer Aircraft Industry Company Ltd (China)
- HARMON (1) – James B.Harmon (United States)
- HARMON (2) – D & J Harmon Co Inc (United States); Harmon Rocket LLC (United States)
- HAT – Hellenic Aeronautical Technologies (Greece)
- HATZ – John D.Hatz (United States)
- HAWKER – Hawker Aircraft Ltd (United Kingdom)
- HAWKER DE HAVILLAND – Hawker De Havilland Australia Pty Ltd (Australia); Hawker De Havilland Ltd (Australia)
- HAWKER SIDDELEY – Hawker Siddeley Aviation Ltd (United Kingdom)
- HB-AIRCRAFT – HB-Aircraft Industries Luftfahrzeug AG (Austria)
- HB-FLUGTECHNIK – HB-Flugtechnik GmbH (Austria)
- HEINKEL – Ernst Heinkel AG (Germany)
- HEINTZ – Christophe Heintz (France)
- HELIBRAS – Helicópteros do Brasil SA (Brazil)
- HELICOM – Helicom Inc (United States)
- HELIO – Helio Aircraft Company (United States); Helio Aircraft Corporation (United States); Helio Aircraft Ltd (United States)
- HELIOPOLIS – Heliopolis Air Works (Egypt)
- HELIPRO – Helipro Corporation International (United States)
- HELI-SPORT – CH-7 Heli-Sport Srl. (Italy); Heli-Sport Srl (Italy)
- HELWAN – Helwan Air Works (Egypt)
- HENDERSON – Henderson Aero Specialties Inc (United States)
- HESA – HESA (Iran Aircraft Manufacturing Industries Company) (Iran)
- HFB – Hamburger Flugzeugbau GmbH (Germany)
- HIGHLANDER – Highlander Aircraft Corporation (United States)
- HILLBERG – Hillberg Helicopters (United States)
- HILLER – Hiller Aircraft Company Inc (United States); Hiller Aircraft Corporation (United States); Hiller Aviation Inc (United States); Hiller Helicopters (United States); Hiller Helicopters Inc (United States)
- HIRTH – Wolf Hirth GmbH (Germany)
- HISPANO – La Hispano Aviacion SA (Spain)
- HISTORICAL AIRCRAFT – Historical Aircraft Corporation (United States)
- HK – HK Aircraft Technology AG (Germany)
- HOAC – HOAC Austria Flugzeugwerk Wiener Neustadt GmbH (Austria)
- HOFFMANN – Hoffmann Aircraft Flugzeugproduktion und Entwicklung GmbH (Austria); Hoffmann Flugzeugbau-Friesach GmbH (Austria); Wolf Hoffmann Flugzeugbau KG (Germany)
- HOLCOMB – Jerry Holcomb (United States)
- HOLLMANN – Martin Hollmann (United States)
- HONDA – Honda Motor Company Ltd (Japan)
- HONDA-MISSISSIPPI – see HONDA and MISSISSIPPI
- HONGDU – Hongdu Aviation Industry Group (China)
- HOVEY – Robert W.Hovey (United States)
- HOWARD (1) – Howard Aircraft Corporation (United States)
- HOWARD (2) – Howard Aero Inc (United States); Howard Aero Manufacturing Division of Business Aircraft Corporation (United States)
- HOWARD HUGHES – Howard Hughes Engineering Pty Ltd (Australia)
- HPA – High Performance Aircraft GmbH & Co KG (Germany)
- HUGHES – Hughes Helicopters Division of Summa Corporation (United States); Hughes Helicopters Inc (United States); Hughes Tool Company, Aircraft Division (United States)
- HUMMEL – J.Morry Hummel (United States)
- HUNTING – Hunting Aircraft Ltd (United Kingdom)
- HUNTING PERCIVAL – Hunting Percival Aircraft Ltd (United Kingdom)
- HUREL-DUBOIS – Société de Construction des Avions Hurel-Dubois (France)
- HYDROPLANE – Gidroplan ooo (Russia); Hydroplane Ltd (Russia)
- HYNES – Hynes Helicopter Inc (United States)
- HYUNDAI – Hyundai Precision Industry (South Korea)

== I ==
- IAI – India Aircraft Industries Ltd (India)
- IANNOTTA – Dott.Ing.Orlando Iannotta (Italy)
- IAR – SC IAR SA (Romania)
- IBIS – Ibis Aerospace Ltd (Czech Republic/Taiwan)
- ICA – Intreprinderea de Constructii Aeronautice (Romania)
- ICP – ICP Srl (Italy)
- III – Iniziative Industriali Italiane SpA (Italy)
- IKAR – OOO Aviaklub Ikar (Ukraine)
- ILYUSHIN – Aviatsionnyi Kompleks Imeni S.V.Ilyushina OAO (Russia); Ilyushin OKB (Russia)
- IMCO – Intermountain Manufacturing Company (United States)
- IMP – IMP Group Ltd (Canada)
- IMPULSE – Impulse Aircraft GmbH (Germany)
- INDAER CHILE – Industria Aeronáutica de Chile (Chile)
- INDAER PERU – Industria Aeronáutica del Perú S.A. (Peru)
- IAL – Indian Aerospace Limited (India)
- INDUS – IndUS Aviation Inc (United States)
- INNOVATION – Innovation Engineering Inc (United States)
- INSTYTUT LOTNICTWA – Instytut Lotnictwa (Poland)
- INTER-AIR – International Aircraft Manufacturing Inc (United States)
- INTERAVIA – Interavia Konstruktorskoye Buro AO (Russia)
- INTERNATIONAL HELICOPTERS – International Helicopters Inc (United States)
- INTERPLANE – Interplane spol sro (Czech Republic)
- INTERSTATE – Interstate Engineering Corporation (United States)
- INTRACOM – Intracom General Machinery SA (Switzerland)
- IPAI – IPAI, Escola de Engenharia de Sâo Carlos (Brazil)
- IPT – Instituto de Pesquisas Tecnologicas (Brazil)
- IRGC – Institute of Industrial Research and Development of the Iran Revolutionary Guard Corps (Iran)
- IRIAF – Islamic Republic of Iran Air Force (Iran)
- IRKUT – Irkutskoye Aviatsionnoye Proizvodstvennoye Obedinenie OAO (Russia)
- IRMA – Intreprinderea de Reparat Material Aeronautic (Romania)
- ISAACS – John O.Isaacs (United Kingdom)
- ISAE – Integrated Systems Aero Engineering Inc (United States)
- ISLAND AIRCRAFT – Island Aircraft Ltd (United Kingdom)
- ISRAVIATION – Israviation Ltd (Israel)
- ISSOIRE – Issoire Aviation SA (France)

== J ==
- J & AS – J & AS Aero Design Sp z oo (Poland)
- JABIRU – Jabiru Aircraft Pty Ltd (Australia)
- JACKAROO – Jackaroo Aircraft Ltd (United Kingdom)
- JAG HELICOPTER – JAG Helicopter Group LLC (United States)
- JAMES – James Aviation (New Zealand)
- JANOWSKI – Jaroslaw Janowski (Poland)
- JAVELIN – Javelin Aircraft Company Inc (United States)
- JEFFAIR – Jeffair Corporation (United States)
- JETCRAFTERS – Jetcrafters Inc (United States)
- JETPROP – Jetprop LLC (United States)
- JETSTREAM – Jetstream Aircraft Ltd (United Kingdom)
- JIHLAVAN – Jihlavan Airplanes sro (Czech Republic)
- JODEL – Avions Jodel SA (France); Société des Avions Jodel (France)
- JOHNSON – Johnson Aircraft Inc (United States)
- JOHNSTON – Johnston Aircraft Service (United States)
- JORDAN AEROSPACE – Jordan Aerospace Industries (Jordan)
- JUNKERS – Junkers Flugzeug- und Motorenwerke AG (Germany)
- JUNQUA – Roger Junqua (France)
- JURCA – Marcel Jurca (France)

== K ==
- K & S – K & S Aircraft (Canada); K & S Aircraft Supply (Canada)
- KADER – Kader Aircraft Factory (Egypt)
- KAISER – Kaiser Flugzeugbau GmbH (Germany)
- KALINAUSKAS – Rolandas Kalinauskas (Lithuania)
- KAMAN – Kaman Aerospace Corporation (United States); Kaman Aircraft Corporation (United States); Kaman Corporation (United States)
- KAMINSKAS – Rim Kaminskas (United States)
- KAMOV – Kamov OAO (Russia); Kamov OKB (Russia); Vertoletyi Nauchno-Tekhnicheskiy Kompleks Imeni N.I.Kamova (Russia)
- KANPUR – Indian Air Force, Aircraft Manufacturing Depot (India)
- KAPPA – Kappa 77 AS (Czech Republic)
- KARI – Korea Aerospace Research Institute (South Korea)
- KARI-KEEN – Kari-Keen Aircraft Inc (United States)
- KAWASAKI – Kawasaki Heavy Industries Ltd (Japan); Kawasaki Jukogyo KK (Japan); Kawasaki Kokuki Kogyo K.K. (Japan)
- KAZAN – Kazansky Vertoletnyi Zavod AO (Russia)
- KELEHER – James J.Keleher (United States)
- KELLY – Dudley R.Kelly (United States)
- KELOWNA – Kelowna Flightcraft Group (Canada)
- KESTREL (1) – Kestrel Aircraft Company (United States)
- KESTREL (2) – Kestrel Sport Aviation (Canada)
- KEUTHAN – Keuthan Aircraft (United States)
- KHRUNICHEV – Gosudarstvennyi Kosmicheskii Nauchno-Proizvodstvennyi Tsentr Imeni M V Khrunicheva (Russia)
- KIEGER – André Kieger (France)
- KILLINGSWORTH – Richard Killingsworth (United States)
- KIMBALL – Jim Kimball Enterprises Inc (United States)
- KIMBREL – Michael G.Kimbrel (United States)
- KINETIC – Kinetic Aviation Inc (United States)
- KING'S – The King's Engineering Fellowship (United States)
- KLEMM – Hans Klemm Flugzeugbau (Germany); Klemm Leichtflugzeugbau GmbH (Germany); Klemm-Flugzeuge GmbH (Germany)
- KLS COMPOSITES – KLS Composites (United States)
- KOLB – Kolb Aircraft Inc (United States); Kolb Company Inc (United States); The New Kolb Aircraft Company Inc (United States)
- KOREA AEROSPACE – Korea Aerospace Industries Ltd (South Korea)
- KOREAN AIR – Korean Air Lines Company Ltd (South Korea)
- KOVACH-ELMENDORF – Alexander Kovach and Leonard Elmendorf (United States)
- KOVACS – Joseph Kovács (Brazil)
- KREIDER-REISNER – Kreider-Reisner Aircraft Company Inc (United States)

== L ==
- LA FRANCE – Neil La France (United States)
- LAIRD – E.M.Laird Airplane Company (United States)
- LAKE – Lake Aircraft Corporation (United States); Lake Aircraft Division of Consolidated Aeronautics Inc (United States); Lake Aircraft Inc (United States); Lake Amphibian Inc (United States)
- LAMBACH – LAMBACH Hugo Lambach (Netherlands)
- LAMBERT – Lambert Aircraft Engineering bvba (Belgium)
- LAMMER GEYER – Lammer Geyer Aviation (South Africa)
- LANCAIR – Lancair Group Inc (United States); Lancair International Inc (United States)
- LANCASHIRE – Lancashire Aircraft Company Ltd (United Kingdom)
- LASER – Laser Aerobatics (Australia)
- LAVEN – Joe Laven (United States)
- LAVERDA – Laverda SpA (Italy)
- LAVIASA – Latin Americana de Aviacion SA (Argentina)
- LEAR – Lear Inc (United States)
- LEAR JET – Lear Jet Corporation (United States); Lear Jet Industries Inc (United States)
- LEARJET – Bombardier Aerospace Learjet (United States); Learjet Corporation (United States); Learjet Inc (United States)
- LEAVENS – Leavens Brothers Ltd (Canada)
- LEDERLIN – François Lederlin (France)
- LEGEND – Legend Aircraft Inc (United States)
- LEGER – Gilles Leger (Canada)
- LET – Let AS (Czech Republic); Let Národní Podnik (Czech Republic)
- LEZA – Leza AirCam Corporation (United States)
- LEZA-LOCKWOOD – Leza-Lockwood Company (United States)
- LH AVIATION – LH Aviation SARL (France)
- LIBERTY (1) – Liberty Aeronautical (United States)
- LIBERTY (2) – Liberty Aerospace Inc (United States)
- LICHTWERK – NV Lichtwerk (Netherlands)
- LIGHT AERO – Light Aero Inc (United States)
- LIGHT MINIATURE – Light Miniature Aircraft Inc (United States)
- LIGHT WING – Light Wing AG (Switzerland)
- LIGHTNING BUG – Lightning Bug Aircraft Corporation (United States)
- LIPNUR – Lembaga Industri Penerbangan Nurtanio (Indonesia)
- LISA AIRPLANES – LISA Airplanes (France)
- LISUNOV – Lisunov OKB (Russia)
- LITTLE WING – Little Wing Autogyros Inc (United States)
- LMAASA – Lockheed Martin Aircraft Argentina SA (Argentina)
- LOAD RANGER – Load Ranger Inc (United States)
- LOCKHEED – Lockheed Aircraft Corporation (United States); Lockheed Corporation (United States)
- LOCKHEED MARTIN – Lockheed Martin Corporation (United States)
- LOCKHEED MARTIN-BOEING – see LOCKHEED MARTIN and BOEING
- LOCKHEED-AZCARATE – Lockheed-Azcarate SA (Mexico)
- LOCKHEED-BOEING – see LOCKHEED and BOEING
- LOCKWOOD – Lockwood Aviation Inc (United States)
- LOEHLE – Loehle Aircraft Corporation (United States)
- LOMBARDI – Aeronautica Lombardi (Italy); Francis Lombardi & Companie (Italy)
- LONG – David Long (United States)
- LONGREN – Longren Aircraft Company Inc (United States)
- LOPRESTI – LoPresti Inc (United States)
- LORAVIA – Lorraine Aviation (France)
- LOT – Letecké Opravovne Trencin SP (Slovakia)
- LOVING-WAYNE – Neal V.Loving, Wayne Aircraft Company (United States)
- LTV – Ling-Temco-Vought Inc (United States); LTV Aerospace Corporation (United States)
- LUCAS – Emile Lucas (France)
- LUNDS TEKNISKE – Lunds Tekniske (Norway)
- LUNDY – Brian Lundy (United States)
- LUSCOMBE – Luscombe Aircraft Corporation (United States); Luscombe Airplane Corporation (United States); Luscombe Airplane Development Corporation (United States)
- LUTON – Luton Aircraft Ltd (United Kingdom)
- LYAVIN – Peter Lyavin (Russia)

== M ==
- MACAIR – Macair Industries Inc (Canada)
- MACCHI – Aeronautica Macchi SpA (Italy)
- MACDONALD – MacDonald Aircraft Company (United States)
- MACHEN – Machen Inc (United States)
- MAD MAX AERO – Mad Max Aero (United States)
- MAGNI – Magni Gyro di Vittorio Magni (Italy)
- MAHINDRA – Mahindra Aerospace( India)
- MAKELAN – Makelan Corporation (United States)
- MALMO – AB Malmö Flygindustri (Sweden)
- MAPO – Federalnoye Gosudarstvennoye Unitarnoye Predpriyatie, Voyenno-Promyshlennyi Kompleks MAPO (Russia)
- MARANDA – Maranda Aircraft Company Ltd (Canada)
- MARCO – Marco-Elektronik Company (Poland)
- MARGANSKI – Edward Marganski-Zaklad Remontów i Produkcji Sprzetu Lotniczego (Poland)
- MARIE – Jean-Pierre Marie (France)
- MARMANDE – Marmande Aéronautique (France)
- MARQUART – Ed Marquart (United States)
- MARSH – Marsh Aviation Company (United States)
- MARTIN – Glenn L.Martin Company (United States)
- MAULE – Maule Air Inc (United States); Maule Aircraft Corporation (United States)
- MAUPIN – Jim Maupin (United States)
- MAVERICK – Maverick Air Inc (United States); Maverick Jets Inc (United States)
- MAX HOLSTE – Société des Avions Max Holste (France); Société Nouvelle Max Holste (France)
- MBB – MBB Helicopter Canada Ltd (Canada); Messerschmitt-Bölkow-Blohm GmbH (Germany)
- MBB-KAWASAKI – see MBB and KAWASAKI
- MCCARLEY – Charles E.McCarley (United States)
- MCDONNELL – McDonnell Aircraft Corporation (United States); McDonnell Company (United States)
- MCDONNELL DOUGLAS – McDonnell Douglas Corporation (United States)
- MCKINNON – McKinnon Enterprises Inc (United States); McKinnon-Viking Enterprises (Canada)
- MD HELICOPTERS – MD Helicopters Inc (United States)
- MDB – MDB Flugtechnik AG (Switzerland)
- MEAD – George Mead (United States)
- MELBOURNE – Melbourne Aircraft Corporation Pty Ltd (Australia)
- MELEX – Melex USA Inc (United States)
- MERCURY – Mercury Air Group (United States)
- MERIDIONALI – Elicotteri Meridionali SpA (Italy)
- MERLIN – Merlin Aircraft Inc (United States)
- MESSERSCHMITT – Messerschmitt AG (Germany)
- MESSERSCHMITT-BOLKOW – Messerschmitt-Bölkow GmbH (Germany)
- METEOR – Meteor SpA, Costruzione Aeronautiche (Italy)
- MEYER – George W.Meyer (United States)
- MEYERS – Meyers Aircraft Company (United States)
- MICCO – Micco Aircraft Company (United States)
- MICROJET – Microjet SA (France)
- MICROLEVE – Microleve (Brazil)
- MICROTURBO – Microturbo SA (France)
- MID-CONTINENT – Mid-Continent Aircraft Corporation (United States)
- MIDWEST AEROSPORT – Midwest Aerosport Inc (United States)
- MIGNET – Henri Mignet (France)
- MIKOYAN – Aviatsionnyi Nauchno-Promyshlennyi Kompleks MiG (Russia); Aviatsionnyi Nauchno-Promyshlennyi Kompleks-ANPK MiG Imeni A.I.Mikoyana (Russia); Mikoyan OKB (Russia); Moskovskii Mashinostroitelnyy Zavod Imeni A.I.Mikoyana (Russia)
- MIL – Mil OKB (Russia); Moskovsky Vertoletny Zavod Imeni M L Milya OAO (Russia)
- MILES – F.G.and G.H.Miles (United Kingdom); F.G.Miles Ltd (United Kingdom); Miles Aircraft Ltd (United Kingdom)
- MILLER (1) – Miller (United States)
- MILLER (2) – William Y.Miller (United States)
- MILLICER – Millicer Aircraft Industries Pty Ltd (Australia)
- MINI-IMP – Mini-IMP Aircraft Company (United States)
- MIRAGE – Mirage Aircraft Inc (United States)
- MITCHELL-PROCTER – Mitchell-Procter Aircraft Ltd (United Kingdom)
- MITSUBISHI – Mitsubishi Aircraft International Inc (United States); Mitsubishi Heavy Industries Ltd (Japan); Mitsubishi Jukogyo KK (Japan); Shin Mitsubishi Jukogyo KK (Japan)
- MOLNIYA – Nauchno-Proizvodstvennoye Obedinenie Molniya OAO (Russia)
- MONG – Ralph Mong (United States)
- MONIOT – Avions Philippe Moniot (France)
- MONNETT – John T.Monnett (United States)
- MONOCOUPE – Monocoupe Corporation (United States); Monocoupe of Florida Inc (United States)
- MONTAGNE – Montagne Aircraft LLC (United States)
- MONTANA – Montana Coyote Inc (United States)
- MOONEY – Al W.Mooney (United States); Mooney Aircraft Corporation (United States); Mooney Aircraft Inc (United States)
- MORANE-SAULNIER – Gérance des Etablissements Morane-Saulnier (France); Société Anonyme des Aéroplanes Morane-Saulnier (France); Société d'Exploitation des Etablissements Morane-Saulnier (France); Société Morane-Saulnier (France)
- MORAVAN – Moravan AS (Czech Republic); Moravan Národní Podnik (Czech Republic)
- MORRISEY – Bill Morrisey (United States); Morrisey Aircraft Corporation (United States); Morrisey Aviation Inc (United States); The Morrisey Company (United States)
- MORSE – George Morse Jr (United States)
- MOURA – Mauricio Impelizieri P.Moura (Brazil)
- MRAZ – Tovarna Letadel Inz.J.Mráz (Czech Republic)
- MSW – MSW Aviation (Switzerland)
- MUDRY – Avions Mudry & Cie (France)
- MURPHY – Murphy Aircraft Manufacturing Ltd (Canada); Murphy Aviation Ltd (Canada)
- MURRAYAIR – Murrayair Ltd (United States)
- MUSTANG – Mustang Aeronautics Inc (United States)
- MVEN – Mven OOO (Russia)
- MYASISHCHEV – Eksperimentalnyi Mashinostroitelnyi Zavod Imeni V M Myasishcheva (Russia); Myasishchev OKB (Russia)
- MYLIUS – Leichtflugzeuge-Entwicklungen Dipl.Ing.Hermann Mylius (Germany); Mylius Flugzeugwerk GmbH & Co KG (Germany)

== N ==
- NABERN – Apparatebau Nabern GmbH (Germany)
- NAI – Nanjing Aeronautical Institute (China)
- NAL – National Aeronautical Laboratory (India)
- NAMC (1) – Nihon Aeroplane Manufacturing Company Ltd (Japan); Nihon Kokuki Seizo KK (Japan)
- NANCHANG – Nanchang Aircraft Manufacturing Company (China)
- NANJING – Nanjing Light Aircraft Company (China)
- NANJING UNIVERSITY – Nanjing University of Aeronautics and Astronautics (China)
- NARDI – Nardi Costruzioni Aeronautiche SpA (Italy)
- NASH – Nash Aircraft Ltd (United Kingdom)
- NATIONAL AERONAUTICS – National Aeronautics Company (United States)
- NATIONAL STEEL – National Steel Corporation Ltd (Canada)
- NAVAL AIRCRAFT FACTORY – Naval Aircraft Factory (United States)
- NAVION – Navion Aircraft Company (United States); Navion Aircraft Corporation (United States); Navion Rangemaster Aircraft Corporation (United States)
- NDN – NDN Aircraft Ltd (United Kingdom)
- NEICO – Neico Aviation Inc (United States)
- NEIVA – Indústria Aeronáutica Neiva S.A. (Brazil); Sociedade Construtora Aeronáutica Neiva Ltda. (Brazil)
- NESMITH – Robert E.Nesmith (United States)
- NEW GLASAIR – New Glasair LLC (United States)
- NEW GLASTAR – New GlaStar LLC (United States)
- NEW MEYERS – The New Meyers Aircraft Company (United States)
- NEW STANDARD – New Standard Aircraft Company (United States)
- NEW ZEALAND – New Zealand Aerospace Industries Ltd (New Zealand)
- NHI – NH Industries SARL (France/Germany/Italy)
- NICOLLIER – Henri Nicollier (France)
- NIEUPORT – NIEUPORT Société Anonyme des Etablissements Nieuport (France)
- NIPPER – Nipper Aircraft Ltd (United Kingdom); Nipper Kits and Components Ltd (United Kingdom)
- NITSCHE – LTB Gerhard Nitsche (Germany); Nitsche Flugzeugbau GmbH (Germany)
- NOIN – Noin Aéronautique (France)
- NOORDUYN – Noorduyn Aviation Ltd (Canada); Noorduyn Norseman Aircraft Ltd (Canada)
- NORD – Nord-Aviation, Société Nationale de Constructions Aéronautiques (France); Société Nationale de Constructions Aéronautiques du Nord (France)
- NORDFLUG – Flugzeugbau Nord GmbH (Germany)
- NORMAN – Norman Aviation (Canada)
- NORMAND DUBE – Aviation Normand Dubé Inc (Canada)
- NORTH AMERICAN – North American Aviation Inc (United States)
- NORTH AMERICAN ROCKWELL – North American Rockwell Corporation (United States)
- NORTHERN – Northern Aircraft Inc (United States)
- NORTHROP – Northrop Aircraft Inc (United States); Northrop Corporation (United States)
- NORTHROP GRUMMAN – Northrop Grumman Corporation (United States)
- NOSTALGAIR – Nostalgair Inc (United States)
- NURTANIO – PT Industri Pesawat Terbang Nurtanio (Indonesia)
- NUSANTARA – PT Industri Pesawat Terbang Nusantara (Indonesia)
- NUVENTURE – NuVenture Aircraft (United States)
- NUWACO – NuWaco Aircraft Company Inc (United States)

== O ==
- OAKLAND – Oakland Airmotive Company (United States)
- OBERLERCHNER – Josef Oberlerchner Holzindustrie (Austria)
- OGMA – Oficinas Gerais de Material Aeronáutica (Portugal)
- OLDFIELD – Andrew Oldfield (United States); Barney Oldfield Aircraft Company (United States)
- OLYMPIC ULTRALIGHTS – Olympic Ultralights LLC (United States)
- OMAC – OMAC Inc (United States)
- OMF – Ostmecklenburgische Flugzeugbau GmbH (OMF Aircraft) (Germany)
- OMNI – Omni Titan Corporation (United States)
- OMNI-WELD – Omni-Weld Inc (United States)
- ON MARK – On Mark Engineering Company (United States)
- O'NEILL – O'Neill Airplane Company (United States)
- OPTICA – Optica Industries Ltd (United Kingdom)
- OPTION AIR – Option Air Reno (United States)
- ORLICAN – Orlican Národní Podnik (Czech Republic)
- OSKBES-MAI – Otraslevoe Spetsialnoe Konstruktorskoe Byuro Eksperimentalnogo Samolyotostroeniya-Moskovskogo Aviatsionnogo Instituta (Russia)
- OSPREY – Osprey Aircraft (United States)

== P ==
- PACAERO – PacAero Engineering Corporation (United States)
- PACI – Philippine Aircraft Company Inc (Philippines)
- PACIFIC AEROSPACE – Pacific Aerospace Corporation Ltd (New Zealand)
- PACIFIC AIRMOTIVE – Pacific Airmotive Corporation (United States)
- PADC – Philippine Aerospace Development Corporation (Philippines)
- PAI – Pacific Aeronautical Inc (Philippines)
- PAKISTAN – Pakistan Aeronautical Complex (Pakistan)
- PANAVIA – Panavia Aircraft GmbH (Germany/United Kingdom/Italy)
- PANHA – Panha (Iran Helicopter Support and Renewal Company) (Iran)
- PANZL – Greg Panzl (United States)
- PAPA 51 – Papa 51 Ltd (United States)
- PARAMOUNT – Paramount Aircraft Corporation (United States)
- PARKER – Cal Y.Parker (United States)
- PARNALL – George Parnall & Company Ltd (United Kingdom)
- PARRISH – Parrish Aircraft Xperimental Inc (United States)
- PARTENAIR – Partenair Design Inc (Canada)
- PARTENAVIA – Partenavia Costruzione Aeronautiche SpA (Italy)
- PASOTTI – Legnami Pasotti SpA (Italy)
- PAULISTA – Companhia Aeronáutica Paulista (Brazil)
- PAWNEE – Pawnee Aviation (United States)
- PAXMAN'S – Paxman's Northern Lite Aerocraft Inc (Canada)
- PAYNE – Vernon W.Payne (United States)
- PAZMANY – Ladislao Pazmany (United States); Pazmany Aircraft Corporation (United States)
- PCV – Pregiate Costruzioni Volanti (Italy)
- PEGASE AERO – Pegase Aero Enr (Canada)
- PENA – Louis Pena (France)
- PENNEC-LUCAS – Serge Pennec & Paul Lucas (France)
- PERCIVAL – Percival Aircraft Ltd (United Kingdom)
- PEREGRINE – Peregrine Flight International (United States)
- PEREIRA – George Pereira (United States)
- PERFORMANCE – Performance Aircraft Inc (United States)
- PHILLIPS – Peter J.C.Phillips (United Kingdom)
- PHILLIPS & POWIS – Phillips & Powis Aircraft (Reading) Ltd (United Kingdom); Phillips & Powis Aircraft Ltd (United Kingdom)
- PHOENIX – Phoenix Aircraft Ltd (United Kingdom)
- PHOENIX-AVIACOR – Phoenix OKB, Aviakor Mezhdunarodnaya Aviatsionnaya Korporatsiya OAO (Russia)
- PIAGGIO – Industrie Aeronautiche e Meccaniche Rinaldo Piaggio SpA (Italy); Piaggio & Companie SpA (Italy); Piaggio Aero Industries SpA (Italy)
- PIAGGIO-DOUGLAS – see PIAGGIO and DOUGLAS
- PIEL – Avions Claude Piel (France); Claude Piel (France); Etablissements Claude Piel (France); Piel Aviation SA (France)
- PIETENPOL – Bernard H.Pietenpol (United States)
- PIK – Polyteknikkojen Ilmailukerho (Finland)
- PILATUS – Pilatus Flugzeugwerke AG (Switzerland)
- PILATUS BRITTEN-NORMAN – Pilatus Britten-Norman Ltd (United Kingdom)
- PIPER – Piper Aircraft Corporation (United States); The New Piper Aircraft Inc (United States)
- PITCAIRN-CIERVA – Pitcairn-Cierva Autogiro Company (United States)
- PITTS – Curtis Pitts (United States); Pitts Aerobatics (United States); Pitts Aviation Enterprises (United States)
- PLAN – Max Plan (France)
- PLUMB – Plumb (United States)
- POBER – Paul H.Poberezny (United States)
- PODESVA – Peter Podesva (Czech Republic); Tomás Podesva (Czech Republic)
- POLIKARPOV – Polikarpov OKB (Russia)
- POLITECHNIKA WARSZAWSKA – Politechnika Warszawska (Poland)
- PORTERFIELD – Porterfield Aircraft Corporation (United States)
- POTEZ – Etablissements Henry Potez SARL (France); Société des Avions et Moteurs Henry Potez (France)
- POTEZ AIR-FOUGA – Potez Air-Fouga (France)
- POTTIER – Avions Pottier (France); Jean Pottier (France)
- POWELL – John C.Powell (United States)
- PRACTAVIA – Practavia Ltd (United Kingdom)
- PRESCOTT – Prescott Aeronautical Corporation (United States)
- PRIVATE EXPLORER – Private Explorer Inc (United States)
- PROCAER – Progetti Costruzioni Aeronautiche SpA (Italy)
- PROFESSIONAL AVIATION – Professional Aviation Services (Pty) Ltd (South Africa)
- PROGRESSIVE AERODYNE – Progressive Aerodyne Inc (United States)
- PROMAVIA – Promavia SA (Belgium)
- PROTECH – ProTech Aircraft Inc (United States)
- PROWLER – Prowler Aviation Inc (United States)
- PULSAR – Pulsar Aircraft Corporation (United States)
- PUTZER – Alfons Pützer KG (Germany)
- PZL-MIELEC – Polskie Zaklady Lotnicze Sp z oo (Poland); Wytwórnia Sprzetu Komunikacyjnego-Panstwowe Zaklady Lotnicze Mielec (Poland); Wytwórnia Sprzetu Komunikacyjnego-Panstwowe Zaklady Lotnicze Mielec SA (Poland)
- PZL-OKECIE – Centrum Naukowo-Produkcyjne Samolotow Lekkich-Panstwowe Zaklady Lotnicze Warszawa (Poland); EADS PZL Warszawa-Okecie SA (Poland); Panstwowe Zaklady Lotnicze Warszawa-Okecie (Poland); Panstwowe Zaklady Lotnicze Warszawa-Okecie SA (Poland); Wytwórnia Sprzetu Komunikacyjnego-Panstwowe Zaklady Lotnicze Okecie (Poland); Wytwórnia Sprzetu Komunikacyjnego-Panstwowe Zaklady Lotnicze Warszawa-Okecie (Poland)
- PZL-SWIDNIK – Wytwórnia Sprzetu Komunikacyjnego Im.Zygmunta Pulawskiego-Panstwowe Zaklady Lotnicze Swidnik (Poland); Wytwórnia Sprzetu Komunikacyjnego-Panstwowe Zaklady Lotnicze Swidnik (Poland); Zygmunta Pulawskiego-Panstwowe Zaklady Lotnicze Swidnik SA (Poland)

== Q ==
- QUERCY – Centre National Quercy-Rouergue RSA (France)
- QUEST – Quest Aircraft Company LLC (United States)
- QUESTAIR – Questair Inc (United States)
- QUICKIE – Quickie Aircraft Corporation (United States); Quickie Enterprises Inc (United States)
- QUIKKIT – Quikkit Corporation (United States); Quikkit Division of Rainbow Flyers Inc (United States); Quikkit Inc (United States)

== R ==
- R & B – R & B Aircraft Company (United States)
- RACA – Representaciones Aero Comerciales Argentinas S.A. (Argentina)
- RADAB – AB Radab (Sweden)
- RAF (1) – Royal Aircraft Factory (United Kingdom)
- RAGWING – RagWing Aircraft Designs (United States)
- RAINBOW – Rainbow Aircraft (Pty) Ltd (South Africa)
- RAND – Kenneth Rand (United States); Rand Robinson Engineering Inc (United States)
- RANS – Rans Inc (United States)
- RAVIN – SA Ravin Composite Aircraft Manufacturers (South Africa)
- RAWDON – Rawdon Brothers Aircraft (Wichita, Kansas USA)
- RAYTHEON – Raytheon Aircraft Company (United States); Raytheon Corporate Jets Inc (United Kingdom)
- REARWIN – Rearwin Aircraft & Engines Inc (United States); Rearwin Airplanes Inc (United States)
- REDA – Reda-MDT Ltd (Russia)
- REDFERN – Walter Redfern Company (United States)
- REFLEX – Reflex Fiberglass Works Inc (United States)
- REIMS – Reims Aviation SA (France)
- REMOS – Remos Aircraft GmbH (Germany)
- RENAISSANCE (1) – Renaissance Composites Inc (United States)
- RENAISSANCE (2) – Renaissance Aircraft LLC (United States)
- RENARD – Robert Renard (France)
- REPLICA PLANS – Replica Plans (Canada)
- REPUBLIC – Republic Aviation Corporation (United States)
- REVOLUTION – Revolution Helicopter Corporation Inc (United States)
- RHEIN – Rhein-Flugzeugbau GmbH (Germany)
- RHEIN-WEST-FLUG – Rhein-West-Flug Fischer und Companie (Germany)
- RIHN – Dan Rihn (United States); Rihn Aircraft Corporation (United States)
- RILEY – Riley Aeronautics Corporation (United States); Riley Aircraft Corporation (United States); Riley Aircraft Manufacturing Inc (United States); Riley International Corporation (United States); Riley Turbostream Corporation (United States)
- RLU – Charles B.Roloff, Robert Liposky and Carl Unger (United States)
- ROBIN – Avions Pierre Robin (France); Avions Pierre Robin Inc (Canada); Robin Aviation (France)
- ROBINSON – Robinson Helicopter Company (United States)
- ROCK – J.Rock Segelflugzeugbau (Germany)
- ROCKET – Rocket Aircraft Company (United States)
- ROCKWELL – Rockwell International Corporation (United States)
- ROCKWELL-MBB – see ROCKWELL and MBB
- ROGERSON HILLER – Rogerson Hiller Corporation (United States)
- ROLLADEN-SCHNEIDER – Rolladen-Schneider Flugzeugbau GmbH (Germany)
- ROLLASON – Rollason Aircraft and Engines Ltd (United Kingdom)
- ROMAERO – SC Romaero SA (Romania)
- ROTARY AIR FORCE – Rotary Air Force Inc (Canada)
- ROTEC – Rotec Engineering Inc (United States)
- ROTORWAY – Rotorway Aircraft Inc (United States); Rotorway International (United States)
- ROUCHAUD – F.Rouchaud, Construction Aéronautique (France)
- ROUSSEAU – Etablissements Rousseau Aéronautique (France); Rousseau Aviation (France)
- RTAF – Royal Thai Air Force (Thailand)
- RUAG – RUAG Aerospace (Switzerland)
- RUPERT – Charles Rupert Joses (Brazil)
- RUSCHMEYER – Ruschmeyer Luftfahrttechnik GmbH (Germany)
- RUTAN – Rutan Aircraft Factory (United States); Rutan Aircraft Factory Inc (United States)
- RYAN – Ryan Aerospace L.L.C.; Austin Texas (United States)
- RYAN – Ryan Aeronautical Company (United States)

== S ==
- SAAB – Saab AB (Sweden); Saab Aircraft AB (Sweden); Saab-Scania AB (Sweden); Svenska Aeroplan AB Saab (Sweden)
- SAAB-FAIRCHILD – see SAAB and FAIRCHILD
- SAASA – Servicios Aéreas de America SA (Mexico)
- SABCA – Société Anonyme Belge de Constructions Aéronautiques (Belgium)
- SADLER – Sadler Aircraft Corporation (United States)
- SAI (1) – Skandinavisk Aero Industri AS (Denmark)
- SAI (2) – SAI Società Aeronautica Italiana srl (Italy)
- SAINT GERMAIN – Centre de Recherches Jean Saint Germain Inc (Canada)
- SALVAY-STARK – M.E.Salvay and George Stark (United States)
- SAMSUNG – Samsung Aerospace Industries Ltd (South Korea)
- SAN – Société Aéronautique Normande (France)
- SANDS – Ron Sands Company (United States)
- SARGENT-FLETCHER – Sargent-Fletcher Company (United States)
- SATIC – Special Aircraft Transport International Company (France/Germany)
- SAU – Nauchno-Proizvodstvennaya Korporatsiya Samoloty-Amfibyi Universalnyye (Russia)
- SAUPER – Sauper Aviation SA (France)
- SAUSER – Sauser Aircraft Company (United States)
- SCALED – Scaled Composites Inc (United States)
- SCALEWINGS – ScaleWings Aircraft GmbH (Austria)
- SCAN – Société des Constructions Aéro-Navales (France)
- SCANOR – Société de Construction Aéronautique du Nord (France)
- SCENIC – Scenic Aviation Services (United States)
- SCHAFER – Schafer Aircraft Modifications Inc (United States)
- SCHEIBE – Scheibe Flugzeugbau GmbH (Germany)
- SCHEMPP-HIRTH – Schempp-Hirth Flugzeugbau GmbH (Germany); Schempp-Hirth GmbH & Companie KG (Germany); Schempp-Hirth GmbH (Germany); Schempp-Hirth OHG (Germany)
- SCHLEICHER – Alexander Schleicher GmbH & Co (Germany); Alexander Schleicher Segelflugzeugbau (Germany)
- SCHWEIZER – Schweizer Aircraft Corporation (United States)
- SCINTEX – Scintex Aviation SA (France)
- SCOTTISH AVIATION – Scottish Aviation Ltd (United Kingdom)
- SCWAL – SCWAL SA (Belgium)
- SEABIRD – Seabird Aviation Australia Pty Ltd (Australia); Seabird Aviation Jordan LLC (Jordan)
- SEASTAR – SeaStar Aircraft Inc (United States)
- SEAWIND – Seawind Inc (United States); Seawind International Inc (Canada); SNA Inc (United States)
- SEGUIN – Seguin Aviation Inc (United States)
- SEPECAT – Société Européenne de Production de l'Avion ECAT (France/United King
- SEQUOIA – Sequoia Aircraft Corporation (United States)
- SERV-AERO – Serv-Aero Engineering Inc (United States)
- SERVOPLANT – Servoplant SRL (Romania)
- SF – Swiss Aircraft and Systems Enterprise Corporation (Switzerland)
- SG AVIATION – SG Aviation (Italy))
- SGAU – Samarsky Gosudartvennyi Aerokosmitsesky Universitet (Russia)
- SHAANXI – Shaanxi Aircraft Company (China); Shaanxi Transport Aircraft Factory (China)
- SHADIN – Shadin Company Inc (United States)
- SHANGHAI – Shanghai Aircraft Manufacturing Factory (China); Shanghai Aviation Industrial Corporation (China)
- SHANGHAI SIKORSKY – Shanghai Sikorsky Aircraft Company Ltd (China)
- SHENYANG – Shenyang Aircraft Corporation (China); Shenyang Aircraft Factory (China)
- SHENYANG SAILPLANE – Shenyang Sailplane and Lightplane Factory (China); Shenyang Sailplane Factory (China)
- SHERPA – Sherpa Aircraft Manufacturing Company (United States)
- SHIJIAZHUANG – Shijiazhuang Aircraft Manufacturing Corporation (China); Shijiazhuang Aircraft Plant (China)
- SHIN MEIWA – Shin Meiwa Industry Company Ltd (Japan)
- SHINMAYWA – ShinMaywa Industries Ltd (Japan); ShinMaywa Kogyo KK (Japan)
- SHINN – Shinn Engineering Inc (United States)
- Short Brothers – Short Brothers & Harland Ltd (United Kingdom); Short Brothers Ltd (United Kingdom); Short Brothers PLC (United Kingdom)
- SIAI-MARCHETTI – SIAI-Marchetti SpA (Italy)
- SIAT – Siebelwerke-ATG GmbH (Germany)
- SIKORSKY – Sikorsky Aircraft Division of United Aircraft Corporation (United States); Sikorsky Aircraft Division of United Technologies Corporation (United States)
- SILHOUETTE – Silhouette Aircraft Inc (United States)
- SILVAIRE – Silvaire Aircraft Company (United States)
- SILVERCRAFT – Silvercraft SpA (Italy)
- SINDLINGER – Fred G.Sindlinger (United States)
- SINGAPORE – Singapore Aerospace Ltd (Singapore); Singapore Aircraft Industries Pte Ltd (Singapore); Singapore Technologies Aerospace Ltd (Singapore)
- SINO SWEARINGEN – Sino Swearingen Aircraft Corporation (United States/China-Taiwan)
- SIPA – Société Industrielle pour l'Aéronautique (France)
- SIRAVIA – Siravia SA (France)
- SISLER – Sisler Aircraft Company (United States)
- SIVEL – Sivel Srl (Italy)
- SKYCRAFT – Skycraft International Inc (United States)
- SKYDANCER – SkyDancer Aviation (United States)
- SKYFOX – Skyfox Aviation Ltd (Australia)
- SKYGEAR – Korean Light Aircraft Corporation (South Korea)
- SKYOTE AEROMARINE – Skyote Aeromarine Ltd (United States)
- SKYSTAR – Skystar Aircraft Corporation (United States)
- SLEPCEV – Slepcev Aircraft Industries (Australia)
- SLINGSBY – Slingsby Aviation Ltd (United Kingdom)
- SLIPSTREAM – SlipStream Industries Inc (United States)
- SMAN – Société Morbihannaise d'Aéro Navigation (France)
- SME – SME Aviation Sdn Bhd (Malaysia)
- SMITH (1) – Frank W.Smith (United States)
- SMITH (2) – Wilbur L.Smith (United States)
- SMITH (3) – Barry Smith (United Kingdom)
- SMYTH – Jerry Smyth (United States)
- SNOBIRD – SnoBird Inc (United States)
- SNOW – Snow Aeronautical Company (United States); Snow Aeronautical Corporation (United States)
- SOCA – Société de l'Ouest de Construction Aéronautique (France)
- SOCATA – EADS Socata (France); Socata Group Aerospatiale (France); Socata Group Aerospatiale Matra (France); Société de Construction d'Avions de Tourisme et d'Affaires (France)
- SOKO – Preduzece Soko (Bosnia-Hercegovina); Soko Air Mostar (Bosnia-Hercegovina); Soko Metalopreradijavacka Industrija sa Organicenom Solidarnom Odgovornoscu Oour-A Oour Fabrika Vazduhoplova (Bosnia-Hercegovina); Soko Vazduhoplovna Industrija Radna Organizacija Vazduhoplovstvo (Bosnia-Hercegovina); Sour Vazduhoplovna Industrija Soko (Bosnia-Hercegovina); Vazduhoplovna Industrija Soko DD (Bosnia-Hercegovina)
- SOKO-CNIAR – see SOKO and CNIAR
- SOLOY – Soloy Conversions Ltd (United States)
- SONEX – Sonex Ltd (United States)
- SOPWITH – The Sopwith Aviation Company Ltd (United Kingdom)
- SORRELL – C.Hobart Sorrell (United States); Sorrell Aviation (United States)
- SPARTAN – Spartan Aircraft Company (United States)
- SPECTER – Specter Aircraft (United States)
- SPECTRUM – Spectrum Aeronautical LLC (United States)
- SPEEDTWIN – Speedtwin Developments Ltd (United Kingdom)
- SPENCER – P.H.Spencer (United States); Spencer Amphibian Aircraft Inc (United States)
- SPEZIO – Tony and Dorothy Spezio (United States)
- SPITFIRE – Spitfire Helicopter Company Ltd (United States)
- SPORT RACER – Sport Racer Inc (United States)
- SPORTAVIA-PUTZER – Sportavia-Pützer GmbH u.Co.KG (Germany)
- SPRATT – George G.Spratt (United States)
- SPRING – W.Spring (Canada)
- SSH – Serwis Samolotow Historycznich (Poland)
- ST. CROIX – St. Croix Aircraft (United States)
- ST. JUST – St. Just Aviation Inc (Canada)
- STAMPE – Stampe & Renard (Belgium); Stampe & Vertongen (Belgium)
- STARCK – André Starck (France)
- STARFIRE – Starfire Aviation Inc (United States)
- STARK – Stark Flugzeugbau KG (Germany); Stark Iberica SA (Spain)
- STARKRAFT – Starkraft (United States)
- STARK-TREFETHEN – George Stark and Al Trefethen (United States)
- STAR-LITE – Star-Lite Aircraft (United States)
- STARPAC – Star of Phoenix Aircraft (United States)
- STATLER – William H.Statler (United States)
- STAUDACHER – Staudacher Aircraft Inc (United States)
- STEARMAN – Stearman Aircraft Company (United States)
- STEEN – Lamar Steen (United States)
- STEMME – Stemme Gmbh & Co KG (Germany)
- STEPHENS – C.L.Stephens (United States)
- STERN – René Stern (France)
- STERN-MALLICK – René Stern et Richard Mallick (France)
- STEWART (1) – Stewart Aircraft Corporation (United States)
- STEWART (2) – Donald Stewart (United States)
- STINSON – Stinson Aircraft Corporation (United States); Stinson Division of Consolidated Vultee Corporation (United States)
- STITS – Stits Aircraft (United States)
- STODDARD-HAMILTON – Stoddard-Hamilton Aircraft Inc (United States)
- STOLP – Louis A.Stolp (United States)
- STORCH AVIATION – Storch Aviation Australia Pty Ltd (Australia)
- STREAMLINE WELDING – Streamline Welding Inc (Canada)
- STRIPLIN – Striplin Aircraft Corporation (United States)
- STROJNIK – Prof. Alex Strojnik (United States)
- SUD – Sud-Aviation, Société Nationale de Constructions Aéronautiques (France)
- SUD-EST – Société Nationale de Constructions Aéronautiques du Sud-Est (France); Sud-Est Aviation (France)
- SUDFLUG – Flugzeug-Union-Süd (Germany)
- SUD-OUEST – Ouest-Aviation (France); Société Nationale de Constructions Aéronautiques du Sud-Ouest (France)
- SUKHOI – Gosudarstvennoye Unitarnoye Predpriyatie Aviatsionnyi Voyenno-Promyshlennyi Komplex Sukhoi (Russia); Opytnyi Konstruktorskoye Buro Sukhogo AOOT (Russia); Sukhoi OKB (Russia)
- SUMMIT – Summit Aviation Inc (United States)
- SUNDERLAND – Sunderland Aircraft (United States)
- SUPAPUP – Supapup Aircraft, Division of Teknico Pty Ltd (Australia)
- SUPER-CHIPMUNK – Super-Chipmunk Inc (Canada)
- SUPERMARINE – Supermarine Aviation Works (Vickers) Ltd (United Kingdom); Vickers-Armstrongs (Aircraft) Ltd (Supermarine Division) (United Kingdom); Vickers-Armstrongs Ltd (Aircraft Section) (Supermarine Division) (United Kingdom)
- SUPERMARINE AIRCRAFT – Supermarine Aircraft PL (Australia)
- SWEARINGEN – Swearingen Aircraft (United States); Swearingen Aircraft Corporation (United States); Swearingen Aircraft Inc (United States); Swearingen Aviation Corporation (United States); Swearingen Engineering and Technology Inc (United States)
- SYNAIRGIE – Synairgie (France)
- SZD – Przedsiebiorstwo Doswiadczalno Produkcyjne Szybownictwa-Panstwowe Zaklady Lotnice Bielsko (Poland); Szybowcowy Zaklad Doswiadczalny (Poland)

== T ==
- TAIFUN – Taifun Experimental Design Bureau (Russia)
- TAMARIND – Tamarind International Ltd (United States)
- TANEJA – Taneja Aerospace and Aviation Ltd (India)
- TAPANEE – Tanapee Aviation Inc (Canada)
- TADES – TATA Aerospace & Defense Engineering Services(India)
- TAYLOR (1) – Taylor Aircraft Company (United States)
- TAYLOR (2) – Moulton B.Taylor (United States)
- TAYLOR (3) – C.Gilbert Taylor (United States); Taylor Aero Inc (United States)
- TAYLOR (4) – John F.Taylor (United Kingdom)
- TAYLOR KITS – Taylor Kits Corporation (United States)
- TAYLORCRAFT (1) – Taylorcraft Aircraft (United States); Taylorcraft Aviation Company (United States); Taylorcraft Aviation Corporation (United States); Taylorcraft Inc (United States)
- TAYLORCRAFT (2) – Taylorcraft Aeroplanes (England) Ltd (United Kingdom)
- TAYLOR-YOUNG – Taylor-Young Airplane Company (United States)
- TBM – TBM Corporation (France/United States); TBM SA (France)
- TEAL – Teal Aircraft Corporation (United States)
- TEAM ROCKET – Team Rocket Inc (United States)
- TEAM TANGO – Team Tango Division, DFL Holdings Inc (United States)
- TECH'AERO – Tech'Aero (France)
- TECHNOAVIA – Nauchno-Kommerchesky Firma Technoavia (Russia)
- TECHNOFLUG – Technoflug Leichtflugzeugbau GmbH (Germany)
- TECNAM – Costruzioni AeronauticheTecnam Srl (Italy)
- TED SMITH – Ted R.Smith & Associates (United States); Ted Smith Aerostar Corporation (United States); Ted Smith Aircraft Company Inc (United States)
- TEMCO – Temco Aircraft Corporation (United States); Texas Engineering & Manufacturing Company Inc (United States)
- TENNESSEE VALLEY – Tennessee Valley Aviation Products Ltd (United States)
- TERR-MAR – Terr-Mar Aviation Corporation (Canada)
- TERZI – Terzi Aerodine (Italy)
- TEXAS AIRPLANE – Texas Airplane Factory (United States)
- TEXAS HELICOPTER – Texas Helicopter Corporation (United States)
- THORP – John W.Thorp (United States); Thorp 211 Aircraft Company Inc (United States); Thorp Aero Inc (United States); Thorp Aircraft (United States); Thorp Engineering Company (United States)
- THRUSH – Thrush Aircraft Inc (United States)
- THUNDER WINGS – Thunder Wings, Division of Thunder Development Inc (United States)
- THURSTON – Thurston Aeromarine Corporation (United States); Thurston Aircraft Corporation (United States)
- TIGER – Tiger Aircraft LLC (United States)
- TIME WARP – Time Warp Aircraft Inc (United States)
- TIPSY – Ernest Oscar Tips (Belgium)
- TITAN – Titan Aircraft Company (United States)
- TL ULTRALIGHT – TL Ultralight sro (Czech Republic)
- TNCA – Talleres Nacionales de Construcciones Aeronáuticas (México)
- TM AIRCRAFT – TM Aircraft (United States)
- TOYOTA – Toyota Motor Corporation (Japan)
- TRADEWIND TURBINES – Tradewind Turbines Corporation (United States)
- TRAGO MILLS – Trago Mills Ltd (United Kingdom)
- TRANSALL – Arbeitsgemeinschaft Transall (Germany/France)
- TRANSAVIA – Transavia Corporation Pty Ltd (Australia); Transavia Division of Transfield (NSW) Pty Ltd (Australia)
- TRAVEL AIR – Travel Air Company (United States); Travel Air Manufacturing Company Inc (United States)
- TRECKER – Trecker Aircraft Corporation (United States)
- TRIDAIR – Tridair Helicopters Inc (United States)
- TRIDENT – Trident Aircraft Ltd (Canada)
- TRI-R – Tri-R Technologies Inc (United States)
- TUPOLEV – Aviatsionny Nauchno-Tekhnishesky Kompleks Imeni A N Tupoleva OAO (Russia); Tupolev OKB (Russia)
- TURBINE DESIGN – Turbine Design Inc (United States)
- TURNER – E.L.Turner (United States)
- TUSAS – TUSAS Aerospace Industries Inc (Turkey); TUSAS Havacilik ve Uzay Sanayi AS (Turkey)
- TUSCO – Tulsa Manufacturing Corporation (United States)
- TWI – TWI Flugzeuggesellschaft mbH (Germany)

== U ==
- UDET – Udet-Flugzeugbau GmbH (Germany)
- UETZ – Walter Uetz Flugzeugbau (Switzerland)
- UFO – Ultimate Flying Object Inc (New Zealand)
- ULLMANN – Ullmann Aircraft Company (United States)
- ULTIMATE – Ultimate Aircraft Division of Ultimate Aerobatics Ltd (Canada)
- ULTRAVIA – Ultravia Aero International Inc (Canada)
- UMBAUGH – Umbaugh Aircraft Corporation (United States)
- UMBRA – Aeronautica Umbra (Italy)
- UNC – UNC Helicopter (United States)
- UNIKOMTRANSO – Unikomtranso AO (Russia)
- UNIS – Unis Obchodni spol sro (Czech Republic)
- UNITED CANADA – United Aircraft of Canada (Canada)
- UNITED CONSULTANT – United Consultant Corporation (United States)
- URBAN – Urban Air sro (Czech Republic)
- UTVA – UTVA Fabrika Aviona (Yugoslavia); UTVA-Sour Metalne Industrije, RO Fabrika Aviona (Yugoslavia)

== V ==
- VALENTIN – Valentin Flugzeugbau GmbH (Germany)
- VALLADEAU – Valladeau (France)
- VALMET – Valmet Aviation Industries (Finland); Valmet OY, Kuoreveden Tehdas (Finland); Valmet OY, Kuorevesi Works (Finland); Valmet OY, Lentokonetehdas (Finland)
- VALTION – Valtion Lentokonetehdas (Finland); Valtion Metallitehtaat (Finland)
- VAN'S – Van's Aircraft Inc (United States)
- VARDAX – Vardax Corporation (United States)
- VARGA – Varga Aircraft Corporation (United States)
- VAT – Vertical Aviation Technologies Inc (United States)
- VEB – Vereinigung Volkseigener Betriebe Flugzeugbau Dresden (Germany)
- VELOCITY – Velocity Inc (United States)
- VENTURE – Venture Light Aircraft Resources LLC (United States)
- VERILITE – Verilite Aircraft Company Inc (United States)
- VERTOL – Vertol Aircraft Company (United States)
- VFW – VFW-Fokker GmbH (Germany)
- VICKERS – Vickers (Aviation) Ltd (United Kingdom); Vickers-Armstrongs (Aircraft) Ltd (United Kingdom)
- VICKERS-SLINGSBY – Vickers-Slingsby Division of Vickers Ltd Offshore Engineering Group (United Kingdom)
- VICTA – Victa Ltd (Australia)
- VIDOR – Giuseppe Vidor (Italy)
- VIKING – Viking Aircraft Ltd (United States)
- VIPER – Viper Aircraft Corporation (United States)
- VISIONAIRE – VisionAire Corporation (United States)
- VITEK – Kompaniya Vitek (Russia)
- VOLAIRCRAFT – Volaircraft Inc (United States)
- VOLMER – Volmer Aircraft (United States); Volmer Jensen (United States)
- VOLPAR – Volpar Inc (United States)
- VOUGHT – Vought Aircraft Company (United States); Vought Corporation (United States)
- VOUGHT-SIKORSKY – Vought-Sikorsky Division of United Aircraft (United States)
- VSR – VSR (United States)
- VSTOL – VSTOL Aircraft Corporation (United States)
- VTOL AIRCRAFT – VTOL Aircraft Pty Ltd (Australia)
- VULCANAIR – VulcanAir SpA (Italy)
- VULTEE – Vultee Aircraft Division of Avco (United States); Vultee Aircraft Inc (United States)

== W ==
- WACO – Waco Aircraft Company (United States); Waco Airplanes, Advance Aircraft Company (United States)
- WACO CLASSIC – Waco Classic Aircraft Corporation (United States)
- WACO OHIO – Waco Aircraft Company Ohio Inc (United States)
- WAGAERO – WagAero Inc (United States)
- WALLERKOWSKI – Heinz Wallerkowski (Germany)
- WAR – War Aircraft Replicas (United States); War Aircraft Replicas International Inc (United States)
- WARNER (1) – Richard Warner Aviation Inc (United States)
- WARNER (2) – Warner Aerocraft Inc (United States)
- WASSMER – Société des Etablissements Benjamin Wassmer (France); Wassmer Aviation SA (France)
- WATSON – Gary Watson (United States)
- WEATHERLY – Weatherly Aviation Company Inc (United States)
- WENDT – Wendt Aircraft Engineering (United States)
- WESTERN – Western Aircraft Supplies (Canada)
- WESTLAND – GKN Westland Helicopters Ltd (United Kingdom); Westland Aircraft Ltd (United Kingdom); Westland Helicopters Ltd (United Kingdom)
- WHATLEY – Vascoe Whatley Jr (United States)
- WHEELER – Wheeler Aircraft Company (United States); Wheeler Technology Inc (United States)
- WHITE – E.Marshall White (United States)
- WHITE LIGHTNING – White Lightning Aircraft Corporation (United States)
- WILDEN – Helmut Wilden (Germany)
- WINDECKER – Windecker Industries Inc (United States)
- WINDEXAIR – Windexair AB (Sweden)
- WING – Wing Aircraft Company (United States)
- WINGTIP TO WINGTIP – Wingtip to Wingtip LLC (United States)
- WITTMAN – Steve J.Wittman (United States)
- WOLF – Donald S.Wolf (United States)
- WOLFSBERG – Wolfsberg Aircraft Corporation NV (Belgium); Wolfsberg-Evektor SRO (Czech Republic)
- WOODS – H.L.Woods (United States)
- WREN – Wren Aircraft Corporation (United States)
- WUHAN – Wuhan Helicopter General Aviation Corporation (China)
- WÜST – Wüst GmbH (Germany)
- WZL 3 – Wojskowe Zaklady Lotnicze Nr.3 (Poland)

== X ==
- XIAN – Xian Aircraft Company (China)

== Y ==
- YAKOVLEV – Moskovskii Mashinostroitelnyy Zavod "Skorost" Imeni A.S.Yakovleva (Russia); Opytno-Konstruktorskoye Byuro Imeni A S Yakovleva OAO (Russia); Yakovlev Aviatsionnoye Korporatsiya OAO (Russia); Yakovlev OKB (Russia)
- YALO – Zaklad Naprawy i Budowy Sprzetu Latajacego Yalo SC (Poland)

== Z ==
- ZENAIR – Zenair Ltd (Canada)
- ZENITH – Zénith Aircraft Company (United States)
- ZIVKO – Zivko Aeronautics Inc (United States)
- ZLIN – Moravan Aeroplanes Inc (Czech Republic); Moravan AS (Czech Republic); Moravan Národní Podnik (Czech Republic); Zlinská Letecká AS (Czech Republic)

== See also ==
- List of aircraft manufacturers
