= Stardust (comics) =

Stardust, in comics, may refer to:

- Stardust (Marvel Comics)
- Stardust the Super Wizard

== See also ==
- Stardust (disambiguation)
