= Starlight Theatre =

Starlight Theatre may refer to:

- Starlight Theatre (Kansas City, Missouri),
- Rock Valley College Starlight Theatre, which performs at the Bengt Sjostrom Theatre (Rockford, Illinois)
- Rock Valley College Studio Theatre (Rockford, Illinois), an indoor theatre often conflated with the outdoor Rock Valley College Starlight Theatre
- Bengt Sjostrom Theatre, the theatre complex that houses the Rock Valley College Starlight Theatre
- Starlight Theatre (TV series), an American anthology drama series that aired on CBS from 1950 to 1951

== See also ==
- Starlight Bowl (San Diego), also called Starlight Musical Theatre
- Starlight (disambiguation)
