= Space dust (disambiguation) =

Space dust is another name for cosmic dust, particles floating in space.

Space dust may also refer to:

- Space debris, or human-made objects abandoned in space
- Regolith, loose particulate soil of which dust is a main component, typically in reference to extraterrestrial bodies
  - Lunar soil (Moon dust)

== Music ==
- Spacedust, a British music production duo
- Space Dust, a New Zealand space rock band formed in 1993
- "Space Dust", a song by Hawkwind

== Other uses ==
- Space Dust, a 1970s confectionery brand
- Slang for crack cocaine dipped in PCP; see List of polysubstance combinations

== See also ==
- Stardust (disambiguation)
