= Summer Starlit Prim =

Fashion designer

- Born: 25th September 1998; Los Angeles, CA
- Citizenship: American
- Education: Interior Design from Academy of Art University, San Francisco
- Occupation: Fashion designer
- Organization: Starlit
- Title: Founder and creative director at Starlit
- Website: starlitla.com

Summer Starlit Prim is a fashion designer and the founder of Starlit, a women's formal wear brand founded in 2020.

== Early life and career ==
She grew up in Los Angeles, California, where she developed an interest in fashion influenced by the region's cinematic history. She was particularly drawn to vintage clothing and craftsmanship, which she explored further through independent studies and travels, including time in Italy, where she observed local artisanal techniques.

== Starlit ==
Prim launched Starlit in Los Angeles with a focus on blending elements of historical Hollywood fashion with contemporary styles. The brand's collections are often inspired by the fashion of the 1950s and feature various silhouettes and styles. She serves as the founder and creative director of Starlit.

== See also ==
- David Latimer
