= Starduster =

Starduster may refer to:

- Starduster (aircraft), a B-17G heavy bomber from World War II on display in Riverside, California
- Starduster (G.I. Joe), a fictional character of the G.I. Joe Team
- Stolp Starduster, an American single-seat homebuilt biplane
- Stolp Starduster Too, an American two-seat homebuilt biplane

== See also ==
- Stardust (disambiguation)
