= Starlit (brand) =

Women's wear brand

- Industry: Fashion
- Founded: 2020
- Founder: Summer Starlit Prim
- Headquarters: Los Angeles, CA
- Products: Womenswear
- Website: starlitla.com

Starlit is a contemporary womenswear label founded by designer Summer Starlit Prim based in Los Angeles, CA.

The label was established in 2020 by Summer Starlit Prim, who also serves as its creative director. It is known for combining elements of classic Hollywood fashion with contemporary designs. Summer, who grew up in Los Angeles, California, developed an interest in fashion influenced by the region’s cinematic history. She focused on vintage clothing and craftsmanship, which she explored further through independent studies and travel, including time spent in Italy, where she observed local artisanal techniques. Starlit’s collections draw inspiration from the fashion of the 1950s.
