= Stardust project =

- Project type: Research and training program
- Funding agency: FP7 Marie Curie Initial Training Networks (ITN) scheme
- Framework programme: Seventh Framework Programme
- Objective: Ways of removing space debris (such as fragments of defunct satellites which risk damaging functioning satellites if they collide with them), and ways to deflect asteroids which could have devastating consequences if they crash into the Earth
- Location: Europe
- Partners: Ten full partners and four associated partner institutions
- Duration: February 2013 – Early 2017
- Website: Stardust project homepage

Stardust, which began in February 2013, was a four-year research and training program looking into ways of removing space debris (such as fragments of defunct satellites which risk damaging functioning satellites if they collide with them), and ways to deflect asteroids which could have devastating consequences if they crash into the Earth.

Stardust was a European programme funded by the FP7 Marie Skłodowska-Curie Actions (MSCA) Initial Training Networks (ITN) scheme. The network is composed of ten full partners and four associated partner institutions across seven European countries. There were five universities – University of Strathclyde (UK), University of Southampton (UK), Technical University of Madrid (Spain), University of Rome Tor Vergata (Italy), University of Pisa (Italy), and the Astronomical Observatory Belgrade (Serbia), four research centres – German Research Centre for Artificial Intelligence (DFKI), Consiglio Nazionale delle Ricerche Italiano (CNR), French National Centre for Scientific Research (CNRS) and the European Space Agency (ESA), and four companies – Deimos Space (Spain), Dinamica (Italy), Astrium Ltd (UK) and Telespazio S.p.A. (Italy). A further 11 early career researchers and 4 post-doctorate researchers were hired and received specialised training.

The Stardust Final Conference on Asteroids and Space Debris was held at the end of October 2016 at the European Space Agency premises.

Stardust completed its four-year remit of research and development activities in early 2017. During that period, the network was awarded the Sir Arthur Clarke award for space research in 2015, was featured at the IAC2016 in Guadalajara, and is supporting the Space Mission Planning Advisory Group of the United Nations on matters related to planetary defense.

Answering to another call for an H2020-MSCA-ITN-2018 proposal, a new Stardust-R research programme was created which aims at training, by research, a new generation of scientists and engineers who can develop enabling technologies and effective solutions to critical problems in planetary defence, minor body exploration and the sustainable use of space.
