= Nu-Klea Starlite =

Defunct American motor vehicle manufacturer

The Nu-Klea Starlite was an electrically powered prototype automobile designed and developed by Stephen P. Kish at the Nu-Klea Automobile Corporation / Kish-Nu-Way Industries in Lansing, Michigan, United States, in 1959. Planned as two-seat, electric runabout the Starlite was to weigh under 2400 pounds including the batteries. A separate motor was to power each wheel powered by three lead acid batteries each. A seventh smaller battery would power accessories. The body was to be of glass fiber reinforced plastic, while a planned removable top was to be of clear acrylic. The batteries would weigh approximately 900 pounds and allow a range 60 miles on an overnight charge.

The prototype was driven in the 1959 Lansing Michigan Centennial parade. The unrestored Nu-Klea Starlite in the collection of the Lane Motor Museum in Nashville, Tennessee, United States matches the photograph of the Starlite which was driven in the parade.
