= Starlight (disambiguation) =

Starlight is the visible radiation emitted by stars other than the Sun.

Starlight or Star light may also refer to:

== Fictional characters ==
- Annie January, a character in The Boys comics and television series who goes by Starlight
- Starlight (DC Comics), one of the alternate identities of Natasha Irons in DC Comics
- Starlight (Marvel Comics), Dr. Tania Belinsky, a Marvel Comics character
- Starlight Glimmer, a character in My Little Pony: Friendship Is Magic

== Film and television ==
- Starlight (TV series), a 1930s BBC programme
- Starlight, a 1996 film starring Rae Dawn Chong and Willie Nelson
- Starlight, an upcoming film directed by Joe Cornish
- Starlight: A Musical Movie, a 1988 film featuring Tichina Arnold
- Revue Starlight, a Japanese media franchise

== Literature ==
- Starlight (comic book), a six-issue limited series from Image Comics
- "Starlight" (fairy tale), by Marie-Madeleine de Lubert
- Starlight (novel), 2006 novel in Warriors: The New Prophecy series by Erin Hunter
- Star Light (novel), by Hal Clement
- "Star Light" (short story), by Isaac Asimov
- Starlight, a science fiction and fantasy anthology series edited by Patrick Nielsen Hayden
- Starlight Beacon, a space station from the Star Wars: The High Republic novels
- Starlight, an unfinished novel by Richard Wagamese

== Music ==
- Starlight (band), an alias used by Italian band Black Box for their hit single "Numero Uno"
- The Starlight, a bar and concert venue in Fort Collins, Colorado, US

=== Albums ===
- Starlight (Joan Armatrading album), 2012
- Starlight (Bethel Music album), 2017
- Starlight (Jon Stevens album), 2017
- Starlight (EP), by Wagakki Band, 2021

=== Songs ===
- "Starlight" (Babymetal song), 2018
- "Starlight" (Dave song), 2022
- "Starlight" (Matt Cardle song), 2011
- "Starlight" (Muse song), 2006
- "Starlight" (Sophie Ellis-Bextor song), 2011
- "Starlight" (The Supermen Lovers song), 2001
- "Starlight" (Taeyeon song), 2016
- "Starlight" (Taylor Swift song), 2012
- "Starlight", by Accept from Breaker, 1981
- "Starlight", by Andy Gibb from Flowing Rivers, 1977
- "Starlight", by Bethel Music and Amanda Cook from Starlight, 2017
- "Starlight", by Brave Combo from Let's Kiss: 25th Anniversary Album, 2004
- "Starlight", from Charlemagne: By the Sword and the Cross, 2010
- "Starlight", by Christophe Willem from Love Shot Me Down, 2012
- "Starlight", by Coco & Puttnam, vocals by Cathy Battistessa
- "Starlight", by Danny L Harle and PinkPantheress, 2025
- "Starlight", by Dreamcatcher from Apocalypse: Save Us, 2022
- "Starlight", by Electric Light Orchestra from Out of the Blue, 1977
- "Starlight", by Freedom Call from The Circle of Life, 2005
- "Starlight", by Freezepop from Fashion Impression Function, 2001
- "Starlight", by Gone Is Gone from Gone Is Gone, 2016
- "Starlight", by Gotthard from Firebirth, 2012
- "Starlight", by Helloween from Helloween, 1985
- "Starlight", by Jennie from Ruby, 2025
- "Starlight", by Loona from Mix & Match, 2017
- "Starlight", by Lou Reed and John Cale from Songs for Drella, 1990
- "Starlight", by Mumm-Ra from These Things Move in Threes, 2007
- "Starlight", by Savatage from Dead Winter Dead, 1995
- "Starlight", by Slash featuring Myles Kennedy from Slash, 2010
- "Starlight," from Star Darlings
- "Starlight", by Stephanie Mills from What Cha Gonna Do with My Lovin', 1979
- "Starlight", by Tonight Alive from What Are You So Scared Of?, 2011
- "Starlight", by Trúbrot
- "Starlight", by VIXX
- "Starlight", by Westlife from Wild Dreams, 2021
- "Starlight", by Wonderland from Wonderland, 2011
- "Starlight", by Yola from Stand for Myself, 2021
- "Starlight", the working title for "Thriller" (song) by Michael Jackson

== Vehicles ==
- Wuling Starlight, a midsize sedan
- Wuling Starlight S, a compact crossover SUV, also badged Chevrolet Captiva EV/PHEV
- Wuling Starlight 560, a compact crossover SUV
- Wuling Starlight 730, a mid-size minivan

== Other uses ==
- Starlight (interstellar probe)
- STARlight, a physics computer program
- Starlight (clipper)
- Starlight, Indiana, U.S., an unincorporated community
- Starlight, Pennsylvania, U.S., an unincorporated community
- Coast Starlight, an Amtrak train
- Starlight Children's Foundation, a charitable organization
- Starlights (women's cricket), a women's cricket team from South Africa

== See also ==
- Starlight Theatre (disambiguation)
- Starlite (disambiguation)
- Stardust (disambiguation)
- Star (disambiguation)
- Light (disambiguation)
