= Applied Aeronautics =

American drone manufacturer

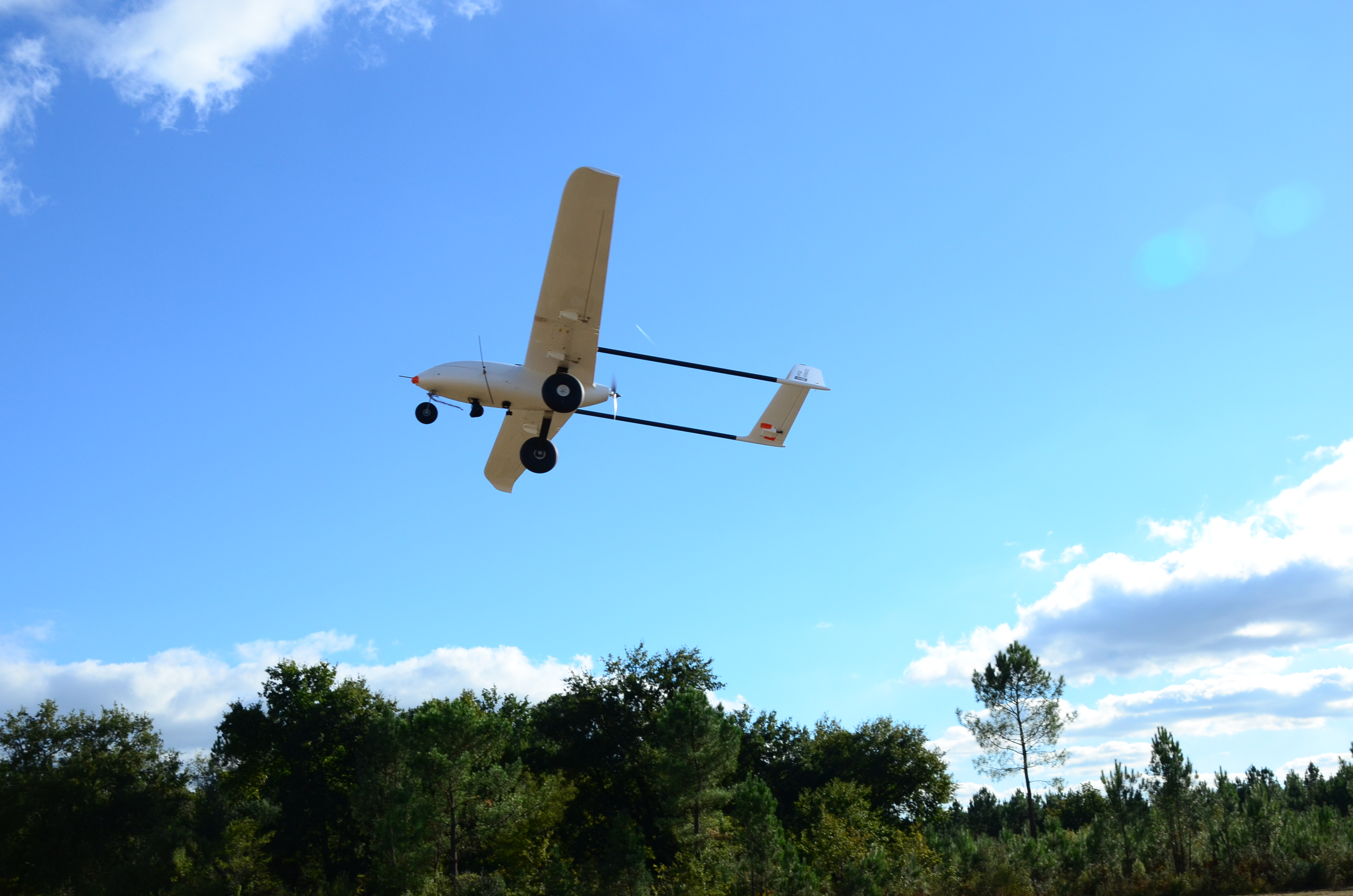
- Company type: Private
- Industry: Aerospace UAV Systems Surveying
- Founded: 2014; Santa Barbara, California
- Founder: Ryan Johnston, Justin Martin, Meg Annand
- Headquarters: Austin, Texas, United States
- Number of locations: 2
- Products: Unmanned aerial vehicles
- Brands: Albatross UAV
- Services: Drones, Avionics
- Website: www.appliedaeronautics.com

Applied Aeronautics is a commercial drone manufacturer. Founded in 2014, Applied Aeronautics is headquartered in Austin, Texas. Applied Aeronautics is a manufacturer of affordable drones and drone related accessories for commercial and government customers. Their flagship product is the Albatross, an electric, long-range, fixed wing UAV.

== History ==
Applied Aeronautics was founded by Ryan Johnston and Justin Martin with the goal of developing a UAV platform that would sit between the two extremes in the unmanned aircraft market: the low cost and high fragility of traditional hobbyist drones on one end, and the high cost of durable, professional drones on the other. Johnston and Martin were joined by Meg Annand in 2015 to lead operations. The company hoped to "swoop into the sweet spot in the middle, creating a useful tool that people could actually buy and use".

When the company launched in 2014, their UAV platform was roughly 1/10 the price of competing systems while carrying a similarly robust feature set.

== Albatross UAV ==
The Albatross is a pusher-prop with an inverted V-tail, a 9.8-foot (3.0 m) wingspan, and a carbon fiber body. It looks a bit like the military RQ-7 Shadow drone but can be purchased for less than US$2,000. There are also options for a ground control station, carrying case, encrypted live HD video link and a number of cameras.

Specs are as follows:

- Wingspan: 3 m (9.8 ft)
- MTOW: 10 kg (22 lb)
- Available payload: 2–4 kg (battery dependent)
- Mission planning and operations software: QGround Control
- Endurance: 2–5 hours depending on battery set up.
- Range: 150–350 km (93–217 miles) depending on battery set up
- Cruise speed: 18 m/s (40 mph; 65 km/h)
- Max Level Speed: 40 m/s (89 mph; 140 km/h)
- Takeoff: 50 ft (15 m) (Runway, unpaved road, catapult)
- Glide Ratio (L/D): 28:1 - 30:1
- Center of Gravity: 85–95 mm from the root leading edge
- Payloads: NDVI, RGB, Thermal, EO/IR, HD Video (swappable)

== Reception ==
Applied Aeronautics has drones in over 50 countries and on every continent. The company focuses on the following industries: disaster response, search and rescue, pipeline surveillance, precision agriculture, natural resources, insurance, education, conservation, mining and public safety. The company counts NASA among its globally recognized clients.

In 2019, it was announced the Albatross UAV was in use by the University of El Paso NASA MIRO Center for Space Exploration and Research with the aim of developing the country's first countywide-area operational low-altitude UAS Traffic Management (UTM) system.

== Partnerships ==
In 2022, Applied Aeronautics announced a partnership with Cambium of Mojave, California, to produce high-survivability group 1, 2 and 3 UAS for military and commercial customers. These new drones will offer protection against fire and laser threats.

In 2022, the Albatross UAV was selected by the University of North Dakota, Embry Riddle Aeronautical University and Kansas University as the test bed for UAS right of way research. This project was sponsored by the FAA as part of the ASSURE program.

In July 2024, Boeing deployed four Applied Aeronautics Albatross fixed-wing UAVs at the Snowdonia Aerospace Centre in Wales, seamlessly integrating Boeing’s autonomy software with each drone’s multispectral machine-vision and advanced search algorithms; this enabled them to autonomously collaborate—sharing environmental data, coordinating their strategies, and intelligently responding to both the terrain and one another—to detect and jam an enemy radio frequency as a unified Air-Launched Effect swarm.

== Approvals ==
- The Albatross UAV is certified compliant for commercial operations by Transport Canada as of June 1, 2019.
- In March 2019, the Albatross UAV was flown by SkyQraft when they received the first drone license for BVLOS applications in Sweden.
- In November 2019, the Albatross UAV received approval from the FAA for the first BVLOS (beyond visual line of sight) flight without ground based radar or a visual observer. This was considered a historic achievement for the group led by Iris Automation and Kansas State DOT. Iris Automations Casia detect and avoid system was on board at the time.

In 2022, Applied Aeronautics announced that the Albatross UAV was compliant with US NDAA Section 848.
