= NSosyal =

Turkish social networking service

- Developers: Turkey Technology Team Foundation (T3 Foundation), Baykar Technology
- Release: 23 July 2025; 14 months ago
- Operating system: iOS, Android, Web
- Type: Social media, microblogging
- Website: nsosyal.com

NSosyal, formerly known as Next Sosyal (officially NEXT TEKNOFEST Sosyal), is a Turkey-based social media platform. It was developed through a collaboration between the Turkey Technology Team Foundation (T3 Foundation) and Baykar Technology, and was opened to the general public on 23 July 2025. The platform stands out for its ad-free structure, transparent algorithm, and data centers hosted in Turkey.

== History ==
NSosyal was released simultaneously for iOS and Android on 23 July 2025.

Baykar Chairman of the Board Selçuk Bayraktar stated in an announcement made through his personal X account that the platform had been developed together with TEKNOFEST entrepreneurs, and described the project as "a digital harbor that prioritizes moral and ethical rules".

== Features ==
NSosyal has a microblogging structure that allows users to share text, images, videos, and polls. Commenting on, liking, and quoting posts are supported.

=== T3 AI ===
T3 AI, integrated into NSosyal, is a Turkish-focused large language model developed by the T3 Foundation and Baykar.

- It can provide automatic replies when tagged in posts
- It can interpret multilingual content
- It has filtering systems against obscenity, hate speech, and disinformation

== Infrastructure ==
NSosyal is based on the Mastodon software, which is built on ActivityPub, an open-source and decentralized social networking protocol.

== Users and reception ==
The platform reached tens of thousands of users in its first week and topped the social networking category of the App Store on 24 July 2025.

It also reached 1 million users in a short period of time, becoming Turkey's fastest-growing domestic social media platform.

Some users and media outlets have compared its interface and usage dynamics to X.

Conversely, some technology writers have criticized the emphasis on "completely domestic software" despite the platform being based on the infrastructure of the Mastodon application.
