= Özdemir Bayraktar =

Turkish entrepreneur and engineer (1949–2021)

- Born: 1949; Sarıyer, Istanbul, Turkey
- Died: 18 October 2021 (aged 71–72); Istanbul, Turkey
- Education: Kabataş Boys High School
- Alma mater: Istanbul Technical University
- Occupation: Engineer · entrepreneur
- Known for: Founder of Baykar
- Spouse: Canan Bayraktar
- Children: Haluk Bayraktar; Selçuk Bayraktar; Ahmet Bayraktar

Özdemir Bayraktar (1949 – 18 October 2021) was a Turkish engineer and entrepreneur. He founded the Turkish private defense company Baykar and was its Chairman of the Board of Directors until his death in 2021. Bayraktar also contributed heavily to Turkey's UCAV industry, as a lead designer of the Baykar Bayraktar TB2 and the architect of the Baykar Bayraktar Akıncı.

== Early life ==
Özdemir Bayraktar was born in 1949 in the Garipçe neighborhood of Sarıyer, Istanbul, Turkey. His father was Lütfi Reis of Sürmene. He graduated from Kabataş Boys High School in Istanbul in 1967 and graduated from Istanbul Technical University's Department of Mechanical Engineering in 1972. He later graduated with a Master's degree from ITU's Department of Engines.

== Career ==
Bayraktar started his career as an engineer focusing on internal combustion engines. He worked at several of Turkey's leading industrial companies, including Burdur Tractors and Istanbul Retaining Ring Uzel.

In 1984, Bayraktar founded the company Baykar Makina, a subcontractor supplier of CNC precision machines which aimed to manufacture and sell automobile parts such as engines, pumps, and spare parts. The company began working with the Turkish military in the 1990s. In 2004, while assisting his son Selçuk with his MIT PhD dissertation on unmanned aerial vehicles, he made the decision to begin focusing Baykar's efforts on designing UCAVs.

Bayraktar contributed to Selçuk's design of the Bayraktar TB2, based on the Bayraktar TB1 prototype, which had its first flight in August 2014. He later designed the Bayraktar Akıncı which flew for the first time in December 2019.

== Personal life and death ==
Bayraktar married Canan Bayraktar, a graduate of Istanbul University Faculty of Economics. The couple had three sons together. Bayraktar's eldest son, Haluk, later became CEO and President of Baykar, while his middle son, Selçuk, later became CTO and Chairman of the Board of Baykar. He held a private pilot's license.

On 1 April 2021, he was awarded the Karabakh Order by Azerbaijani president Ilham Aliyev for his "contribution to the liberation of Karabakh from the occupation of Armenia". Özdemir Bayraktar died on 18 October 2021.
