= Lisa Schettner =

- Born
- Genres: folk; Celtic; medieval; pop; folk rock; bluegrass; EDM
- Occupations: Singer-songwriter, musician, producer
- Instruments: Piano, guitar, irish flute
- Years active: 2016–present
- Website: lisaschettner.com

Elisabeth Schettner, known as Lisa Schettner (previously Liz Schettner), is a French singer-songwriter and producer, of French, Czech and German descent.

Environmentalist and human rights defender, Schettner is known for her activism through her songwriting, including her songs "Wild", "Hands Off Ukraine", "Bayraktar [Mashup Edition]", and "Out of Touch". Most of her other songs are romantic, folk, medieval, Celtic ballads.

Schettner's song "Bayraktar [Mashup Edition]", written in collaboration with Ukrainian colonel Taras Borovok, talks about the invasion of Ukraine in February 2022. Major newspapers, such as The Telegraph and La Dépêche, picked up the story, and the song was also shared on the official Telegram page of the Ukrainian parliament. The single made it to the Ukrainian hit parade, and has been played on Ukrainian radio stations. "Bayraktar [Mashup Edition]" is referenced in Tjasa Mohar and Victor Kennedy's book Words, Music and Propaganda, published in 2023. The song is also the subject of the article Not your ordinary drone: odes to the Bayraktar in the Russia–Ukraine war, published in 2024 by the Cambridge University Press.

Georgian writer Tamuna Tsertsvadze, in her book Gift of the Fox, named one of the main characters Liz Schettner, in honour of the singer-songwriter. Following that, Schettner wrote "Edmund's Lullaby", based on Tsertsvadze's lyrics, as a soundtrack for Tsertsvadze's novel Zodiac Circle.

Schettner's folk songs "Up High" and "Great Expectations" were elected for the Celtic Top 20 of the Irish & Celtic Music Podcast. Additionally, "Up High" received an honourable mention in the Texas Scot Talent contest. Schettner's track "Baby Beauty" reached international popularity, has been used by thousands of social media users, and is regularly played at baby shower parties.

== Early life and education ==
During her childhood and teenage years, Schettner received private training by artists such as, among others, Ed Sadler, Hilary Carrington, Simon Carrington, Carole Tarlington and Cameron Bancroft. Her training continued at The Lir Academy and Rose Bruford College. Lisa Schettner's dance skills, first oriented towards ballet, lyrical and jazz, flourished under the influence of Teya Wild (finalist in So You Think You Can Dance Canada, Season 4), and the Viennese Elmayer dance school. In 2017, after passing her entrance exams, Lisa Schettner was accepted for studies at Berklee College of Music in Boston.
