= Taras Borovok =

Ukrainian colonel and songwriter

Colonel Taras Borovok
- Born: 1 January 1973 (age 53); Kyiv, Ukraine
- Notable work: Bayraktar

Taras Borovok (Ukrainian: Тарас Боровок) (born January 1, 1973), is a Ukrainian lieutenant colonel, producer, and singer-songwriter. His patriotic song "Bayraktar" came to prominence after its release on 1 March 2022 in the aftermath of the Russian invasion of Ukraine.

== Life and career ==
Graduating from Suvorov Military School (Note: In Soviet Union, Suvorov schools were military schools for children) in Minsk (1988-1990), Borovok was with the army since his teenage years. As an amateur musician, he wrote over 100 songs. After being sacked in 2006 due to cutbacks in the Ukrainian army, Borovok worked as a TV presenter, screenwriter, and film director. On the onset of the Russian invasion 24 February 2022 he signed a contract, rejoined the service and began working at the Ukrainian Land Forces Center of Information, Monitoring, and Countermeasures (Центр інформації, моніторингу і протидії), being promoted to the rank of lieutenant-colonel.

Borovok said in an interview by the Turkish press: “The Armed Forces of Ukraine knew of my creative skills, so they asked me to prepare a video about the Turkish-made Bayraktar TB2, a drone that had been helping our army a lot in the battlefield. I thought it was better to create a song about it. I composed the melody and came up with the lyrics in a short time. The song was written within 2 hours."

Overall, after enlisting, Borovok spent 3 months writing more military songs. Together with his colleague Dmitro Naumov, they created "Duet named after Putin" ("Дуэт имени путина") and wrote sarcastic, teasing songs in Russian, aimed at the enemy (Russian) audience. However they realized than their project serves to unite the Russians in their hatred to Ukraine, so they cancelled it.

Taras later released alternative versions of "Bayraktar", including a remix by Ukrainian DJ Andriy Muzon (Ukrainian: Андрій Музон), and a mashup edition in collaboration with French singer-songwriter Lisa Schettner. Due to his artistic collaboration with Lisa, Taras Borovok became known in France.

In July 2022, Taras released song and video "HIMARS", about the missile system of the same name. The song used the similar type of bawdy humor and simple but catchy tune as in "Bayraktar", beginning with "Our brotherly friend from America scared the Russians so bad they farted smoke". (Note: " Із Америки приїхав наш надійний побратим. Познайомтеся із ним - HIMARS. В росіян зі сраки дим - HIMARS." Literal translation: "Our reliable sworn brother came from the United States. Meet him - HIMARS. The Russians have smoke out of their asses - HIMARS.")

Borovok considers his songs to be an important part of information warfare, and shares his experience with NATO experts. For example, in September 2022, Taras released "Армія - це ти" (Armiya - tse ty, 'The army is you'), explaining that his goal was to motivate people to join the army, by shifting the initial motto "We Trust in the Armed Forces" to "Unity with the Army". As of March 2023 he had written 35 songs since the beginning of the war. His second area of responsibility in the Information Centre is documentary films.

The song "Bayraktar", as well as its mashup by Schettner, are discussed in the book Words, Music and Propaganda, by Tjaša Mohar, Victor Kennedy.
