= Haluk Bayraktar =

Turkish engineer and executive

- Born: Lütfü Haluk Bayraktar; 4 October 1978 (age 47)
- Education: Middle East Technical University (BS); Columbia University (MS)
- Occupation: Businessman · Engineer
- Known for: Baykar; T3 Foundation; SAHA İstanbul; TÜBİTAK
- Spouse: Fatma Bayraktar
- Children: 2
- Father: Özdemir Bayraktar
- Relatives: Selçuk Bayraktar (brother)

Lütfü Haluk Bayraktar (born 4 October 1978) is a Turkish engineer and executive. He is the CEO of Baykar, TÜBİTAK Board Member and founder and chairman of the board of Turkey Technology Team Foundation (T3 Foundation) and SAHA Istanbul. He is a pioneer of Turkey for autonomous technology efforts which reshaped battlefields and geopolitics which resulted with a change of future warfare doctrines.

== Life ==
Bayraktar was born in 1978 in Istanbul, Turkey. Bayraktar's father, Özdemir Bayraktar, is the founder of Baykar, a prominent Turkish defense and aviation company. His brother, Selçuk Bayraktar, also plays a significant role in the company, contributing to its operations and advancements in the industry. He completed his undergraduate degree in Industrial Engineering at the Middle East Technical University (METU) in 2000, and went on to earn a master's degree in the same field from Columbia University in 2002.

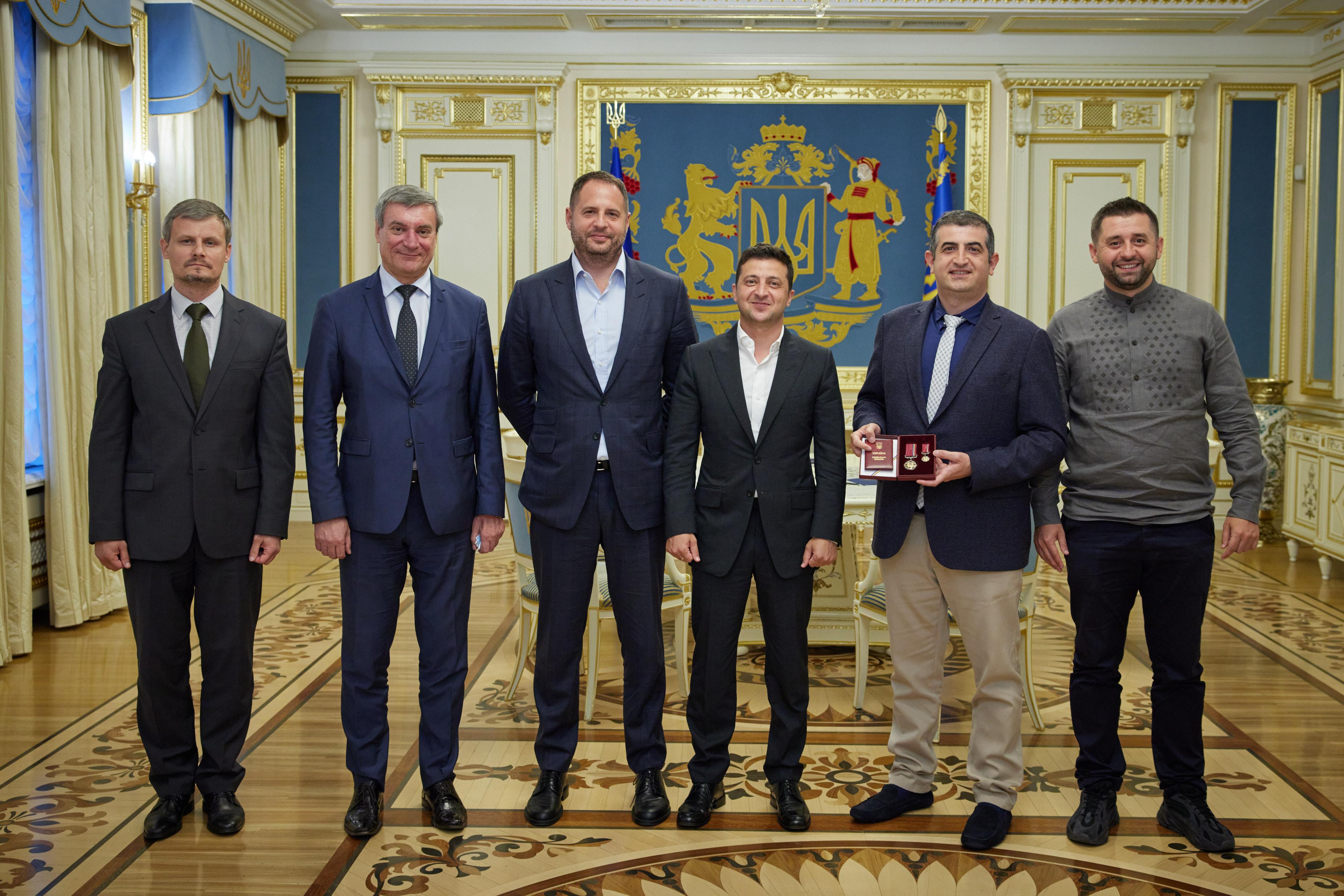
On 25 August 2020, with Ukrainian President Zelenskyy

After completing his education in the United States, Bayraktar returned to Turkey and joined Baykar, a company primarily involved in the automotive supplier industry at the time. At Baykar, he took on the role of engineering manager, where he contributed significantly to the company's pioneering efforts in the defense industry, particularly in the research and development and production of Turkey's first national and original Unmanned Aerial Vehicle (UAV) Systems. During his tenure, he managed various aspects of the product lifecycle, including conceptual design, prototyping, testing, production, and training.

== CEO of Baykar ==
Bayraktar serves as the CEO of Baykar, a prominent company in Turkey specializing in autonomous technology. He started his tenure at Baykar in 2004, initially working as an engineering manager. Bayraktar has been integral to various facets of the company's operations, encompassing engineering, project management, logistics, and business development.

Beyond his corporate responsibilities, Bayraktar co-founded the Turkey Technology Team (T3) Foundation. This initiative is designed to promote technology education among Turkish youth, encouraging entrepreneurship and providing technology education through various competitions and programs.

He is also a founding member and was the chairman of the board for SAHA Istanbul, the Aerospace and Defense Cooperative, which includes collaboration from over 600 companies and 16 universities.

During the COVID-19 pandemic, under his leadership, Baykar adapted its resources to design and mass-produce ventilators to assist in the healthcare crisis.

In the context of the 2022 Russian invasion of Ukraine, Bayraktar has publicly expressed support for Ukraine. In an interview with CNN, he stated that his company had not supplied and would not supply military technology to Russia, emphasizing support for Ukraine's sovereignty and independence. Bayraktar has expressed pride that the Bayraktar TB2 drone has become recognized as a symbol of Ukrainian resistance against Russia.

Bayraktar has been recognized for his significant financial contributions to the Turkish economy, ranking as one of the highest income taxpayers in the country in 2021, 2022 and 2023.

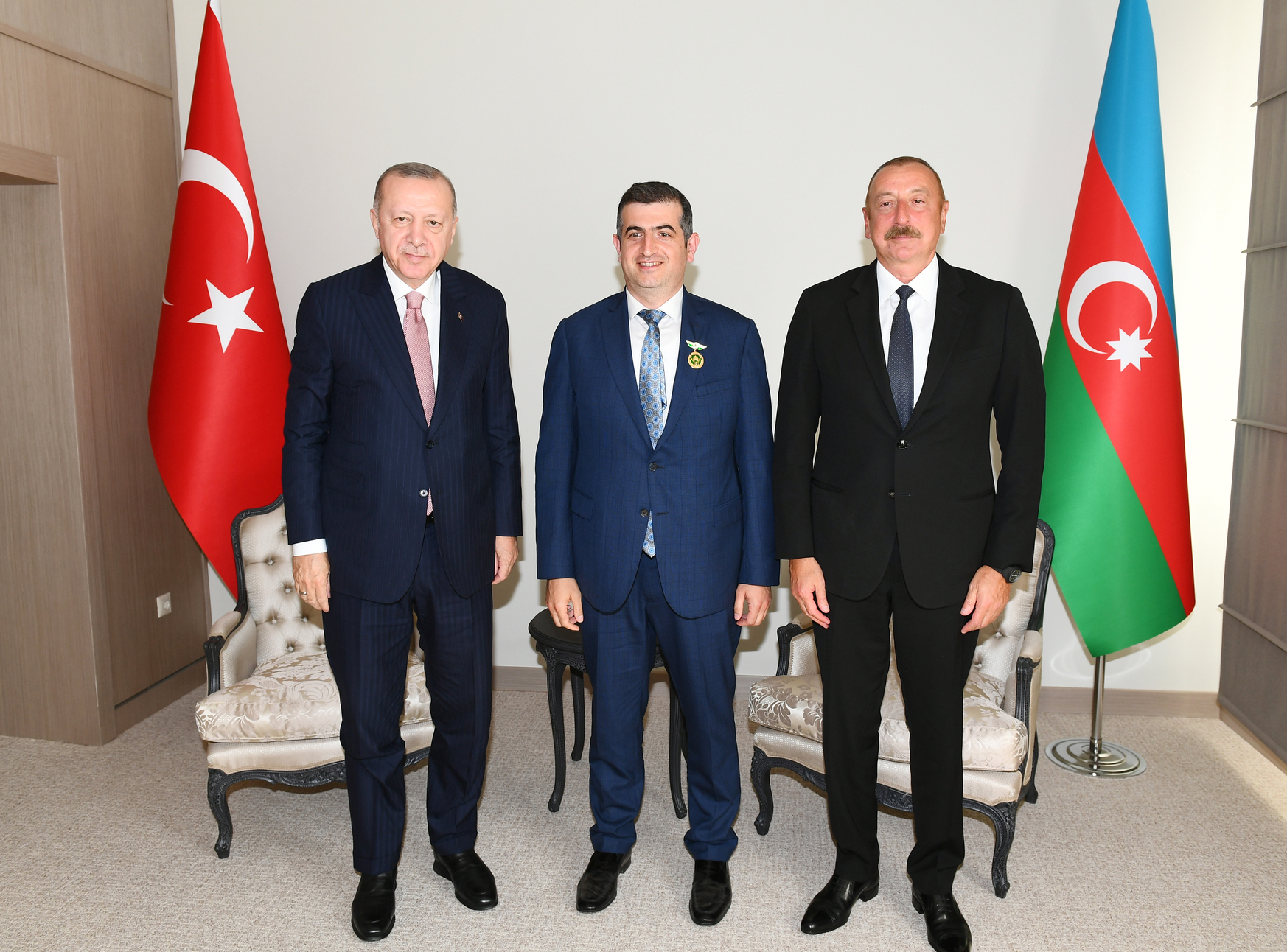
On 15 June 2021, with Turkish President Erdoğan Azerbaijani President Ilham Aliyev

== Honours and medals ==
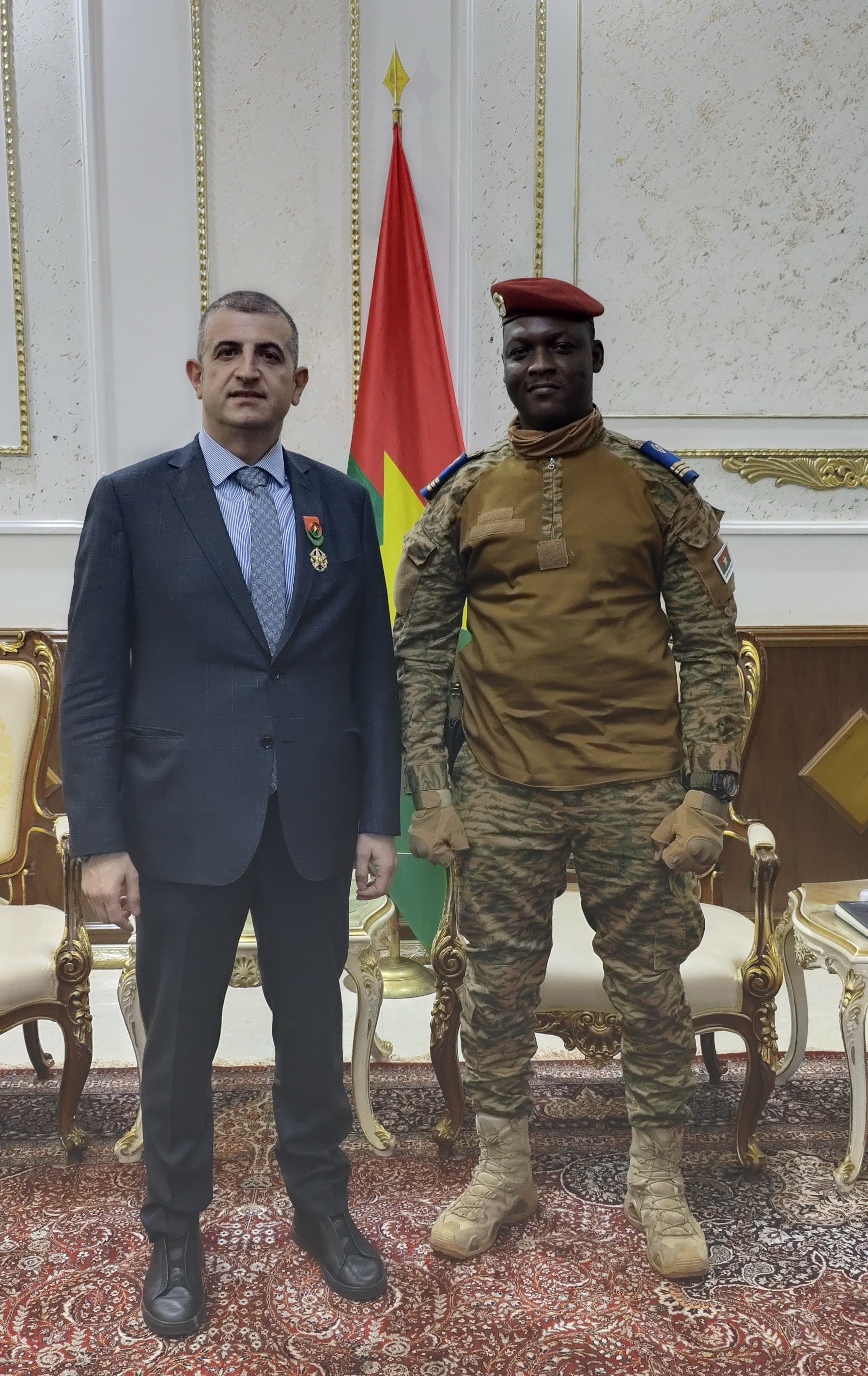
Bayraktar with Burkinabe President Ibrahim Traoré.

Ribbon bar	Award or decoration	Country	Date	Place	Note	Ref.
	Order of Merit of Ukraine (1st Degree)	Ukraine	29 August 2022	Kyiv	Bayraktar was awarded an Order of Merit of 1st Degree of Ukraine by President Volodymyr Zelenskyy for his service to for significant personal merits in strengthening interstate cooperation, support of state sovereignty and territorial integrity of Ukraine, significant contribution to the popularization of the Ukrainian state in the world	
	Order of Merit of Ukraine (3rd Degree)	Ukraine	25 August 2020	Kyiv	Bayraktar was awarded with an Order of Merit of Ukraine at the Presidential Palace in Kyiv by President Volodymyr Zelenskyy for his service to Ukraine and Ukraine-Turkey relations	
	Karabakh Order	Azerbaijan	15 June 2021	Shusha	Bayraktar was awarded this high award for his contribution to strengthening fraternal relations between Azerbaijan and Turkey, developing of cooperation, ensuring the territorial integrity and sovereignty of the Republic of Azerbaijan	
	National Order of Mali	Mali	19 October 2023	Bamako	Malian President Assimi Goita awarded Turkish drone magnate Baykar's general manager, Bayaraktar, and chief technology officer Selçuk Bayraktar along with other two members of their team the country's “National Order” for their contributions and services to Mali.	
	Order of the Stallion	Burkina Faso	25 April 2023	Ouagadougou	The Order of the Stallion medal, the country's highest national honour, by the order of Burkina Faso's President Ibrahim Traore for his outstanding and exceptional contributions to the West African nation's peace, security and counter-terrorism activities.	
	Medal of the Order of Danaker	Kyrgyzstan	28 October 2023	Bishkek	On 29 October 2023, the State Order of Daneker was awarded to Bayraktar, by the President of the Kyrgyz Republic, Sadyr Japarov, in recognition of the support provided to the security and technology of the Kyrgyz Republic through Turkey's indigenous and national UAVs, Bayraktar TB2 and Bayraktar AKINCI	
	Distinguished Service Medal	Republic of Kosovo	6 November 2023	Pristina	Awarded with distinguished Service Medal for the dedication and contribution given to the development of the strategic defense capacities of the Republic of Kosovo on 6 November 2023.	
	Ukraine State Border Control Service Medal	Ukraine	1 September 2023	Kyiv	Medal for assistance in the protection of the state border	
	Ukrainian Air Force	Ukraine	6 April 2023	Kyiv	Medal for skill, honor, and courage by the Ukrainian Air Force Command.	
	State Enterprise Antonov	Ukraine	14 September 2021	Kyiv	On the occasion of the 75th anniversary of the establishment of the state company Antonov Aircraft Factory (Ukraine), the Antonov medal was presented for its contributions to the aviation industry	
	Ministry of Defense of Ukraine	Ukraine	2 February 2024	Vinnitsa	The Ministry of Defense of Ukraine awarded the “Star of Military Brotherhood” medal to Bayraktar. The medals were presented by Lt. Gen. Mykola Oleschuk, a war hero and commander of the Ukraine's Air Force, at a Ukrainian military base on 2 February 2024.	
	Ethiopian Federal Democratic Republic Honor Medal	Ethiopia	16 December 2023	Addis Ababa	Bayraktar was awarded the Ethiopian Federal Democratic Republic Honor Medal on 16 December 2023, for his valuable contributions to enhancing and developing the national and air force capabilities of Ethiopia. The medal was presented to Bayraktar during a ceremony in Addis Ababa, as part of the 88th anniversary celebrations of the Ethiopian Air Force, in the presence of Ethiopian Prime Minister Abiy Ahmed Ali, by Chief of General Staff Marshal Birhanu Jula and Air Force Commander Lieutenant General Yilma Merdasa.	
	Medal for Services in Military Cooperation	Azerbaijan	14 March 2025	Baku	On March 14, 2025, during his visit to Azerbaijan, Bayraktar was awarded the "For services in the field of military co-operation" medal by Minister of Defense of Azerbaijan, Colonel General Zakir Hasanov.	
