= Zafar Order =

Military order of Azerbaijan

Zafar Order «Zəfər» ordeni
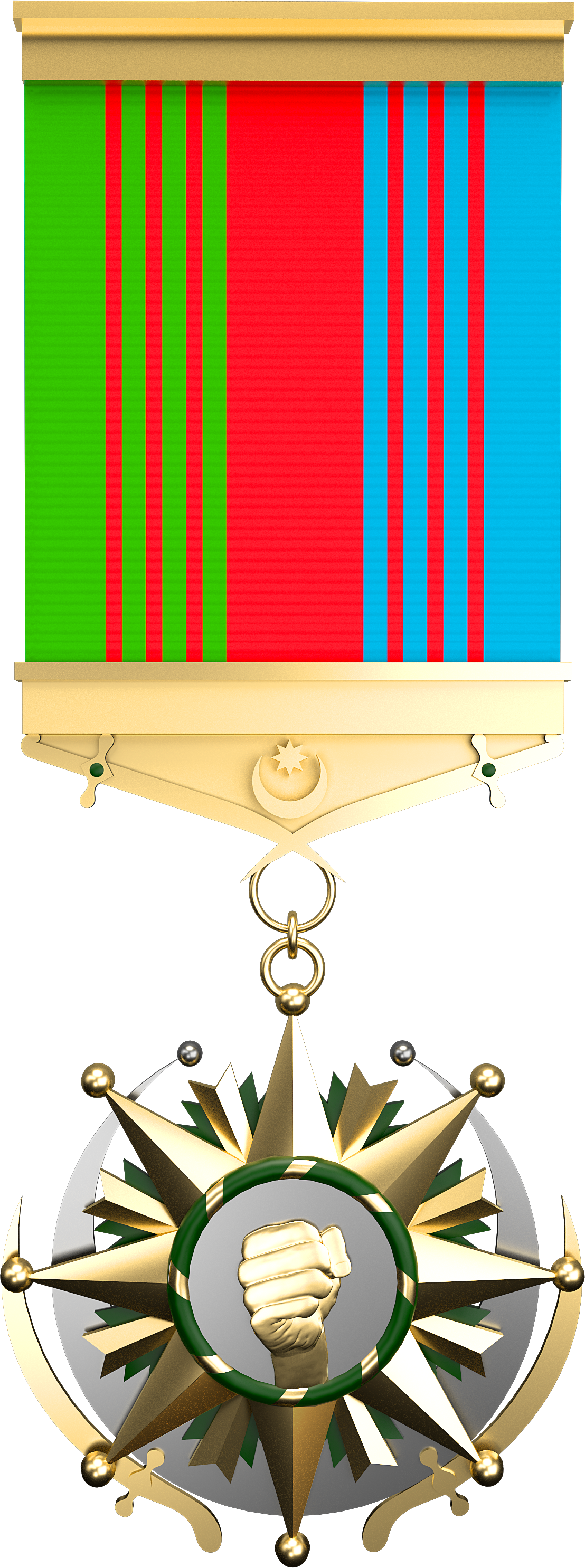
- Type: Individual award
- Awarded for: High professionalism in the management of combat operations that culminated in the liberation of strategic or important territories, settlements, districts or cities, as well as the restoration of the state border.
- Status: Active
- Established: 20 November 2020

Precedence
- Next (higher): Heydar Aliyev Order
- Next (lower): Karabakh Order

The Zafar Order, or the Victory Order (Azerbaijani: "Zəfər" ordeni), is the highest military order of Azerbaijan. It was established on the occasion of Azerbaijan’s victory in the Second Nagorno-Karabakh War.

== History ==
On 11 November 2020, the President of Azerbaijan, Ilham Aliyev, at a meeting with wounded Azerbaijani servicemen who took part in the Second Nagorno-Karabakh War, said that new orders and medals would be established in Azerbaijan, and that he gave appropriate instructions on awarding civilians and servicemen who showed "heroism on the battlefield and in the rear and distinguished themselves in this war." He also proposed the names of these orders and medals. On 20 November 2020, at a plenary session of the Azerbaijani National Assembly, a draft bill on amendments to the bill "On the establishment of orders and medals of the Republic of Azerbaijan" was submitted for discussion.

The Zafar Order was established on the same day in the first reading in accordance with the bill "On the establishment of orders and medals of the Republic of Azerbaijan" on the occasion of Azerbaijan being the victor in the Second Nagorno-Karabakh War.

=== Awarding ===
On 9 December, the President of Azerbaijan, Ilham Aliyev signed a decree to award 33 officers, two of them posthumously with the Zafar Order. The awardees included Zakir Hasanov, the minister of defence, Vilayat Eyvazov, the minister of internal affairs, Elchin Guliyev, chief of the State Border Service, Ali Naghiyev, chief of the State Security Service, Orkhan Sultanov, chief of the Foreign Intelligence Service, Ayaz Hasanov, deputy chief of staff of the Azerbaijani Armed Forces, and Babak Samidli, the deputy commander of the 2nd Corps.

== Status ==
The Zafar Order will be awarded for "high professionalism in the management of combat operations that culminated in the liberation of strategic or important territories, settlements, districts or cities, as well as the restoration of the state border". According to the bill "On the establishment of orders and medals of the Republic of Azerbaijan", the medal's senior award is the Heydar Aliyev Order, while its junior award is the Karabakh Order.
