= Fear Zero =

Vancouver rock and country band

- Origin: Vancouver, British Columbia, Canada
- Genres: Rock; country; Country rock
- Years active: 2004–present
- Labels: Satch Records, Mojo Records
- Members: Ed Sadler; Tony Ferraro; Martin Bertrand; Jeremy Harrison
- Website: http://www.fearzero.com/

Fear Zero is a band from Vancouver which plays mainly rock and country music. Ed Sadler is the band's lead vocalist, lead guitarist, songwriter and producer. Most of the recorded music is also performed by Sadler. Additional musicians are included for live performances and occasionally in recording sessions.

== History ==
=== 2004–2005: Early years, first album Fear Zero, and EP Concentrated ===
"I would say it comes from a place that is a love for music," Sadler said on Jango radio. "I tried to write songs that made me happy. It's just ideas. You collect ideas as time goes on. If it's a good idea, I'm all for it. If one were a genius, they might have an iron fist, but to me all that matters is whatever makes the song better." Ed Sadler grew up listening to rock and metal. He studied at Selkirk College, and Capilano College from which he graduated with honours. “Finding players that are on the same wavelength was tough. My technique has been honed by my jazz experience so I was trying to find guys who were technically good and could do their own thing.”

On 1 January 2004, Fear Zero independently released their first and eponymous album Fear Zero, which included their most popular song to date "Satellite." The album received Canada-wide airplay. The single "Sunday Morning" was a top 40 hit and "Satellite" reached the top 50. The band toured British Columbia and Alberta, and set out on a cross-Canada tour in late 2004 Orcasound.com review lauded their debut describing it as "anxious sounding modern rock". The album covers such themes as abuse and "crazy city dating scene".

In 2005, the band released an EP titled Concentrated. The single "Porno Nation" was placed in the top ten of the annual CFOX Seeds competition in Vancouver. Another single from that same album, "Day Of Our Last Night", was in the top 50 chart at Canadian AOR radio. The song was later featured in the American-Canadian television show "Ties That Bind" and Netflix movie "Pretty Little Stalker". The EP also included a bonus radio edit of the song "Beautiful Scars". "Beautiful scars" is included on the EP in two versions as a radio edit and a longer version. "Melodic.net" gave Concentrated three-and-a-half stars out four, comparing them to bands Red Hot Chili Peppers, Third Eye Blind, and Sugar Ray. The song "Porno Nation" was described as "supercatchy" and "Day Of Our Last Night" was described as "candy for the ears".

=== 2007–2008: In Lights and Whole Damn Nation ===
After signing a recording deal with several investors, on April Fools' Day in 2007, the band released a full 13 song album named In Lights. The album was released by Fontana North/Universal. Both singles "Breathe Again" and "You Make Me Feel" became hit singles. The video for "Breathe Again" received airplay on MuchMusic and MuchLoud from May to July 2007. The band played a 35-show cross-Canada tour, traveling from Vancouver to Halifax and back.

In 2009, Sadler set out to create his fourth album Whole Damn Nation with the help of the Guiney Bros. "Without whom this CD would not have been possible is an understatement", Sadler said in an interview, referring to the liner notes in his new CD. With the Guiney Bros.' help, Fear Zero worked with artists Mike Fraser (AC/DC, Aerosmith, Hinder) and Darren Grahn (Metallica, Crossfade, Third Eye Blind). The band members included drummer Tony Ferraro from Trail, bassist Martin Bertrand from Toronto, and guitarist Jeremy Harrison whom Ed had met while the two taught at a local music store.

The album, released in 2010, was described to combine the musicianship of Van Halen/Foo Fighters tempered with the melodic approach of Stone Temple Pilots/Collective Soul. It incorporates a wide variety of styles from hard rock to simple pop to reggae. The track that gave the name to the album, "Whole Damn Nation" is a commentary on what is being thrust at people by the media and pop-culture, "and the likes of Paris Hilton, Pamela Anderson", Sadler added in an interview.

=== 2014–present: Running Red Lights and Ed Sadler's solo career debut ===
On 2 May 2014 Fear Zero released their last single "Running Red Lights", mixed and co-produced by Darren Grahn.

From 2014 to 2017, Sadler mixed, mastered and co-produced several singles written by French singer-songwriter Lisa Schettner. His vocals were also featured in her environmentalist track "Wild".

Ed Sadler is currently working on his solo album in his studio in North Vancouver, Canada. In his spare time, Sadler teaches electric and acoustic guitar, bass, vocals and ukulele in his studio on Lonsdale Avenue. Some of his students got accepted to Berklee College of Music. He also regularly uploads guitar tutorials on his YouTube channel Uptempo Music Lessons.

== Other achievements ==
Fear Zero were opening acts for both Tom Cochrane and Nazareth. The band also sold over 5,000 CDs, and 10,000 downloads.
