= Bayraktar (song) =

2022 Ukrainian patriotic song

Song
- Language: Ukrainian
- Released: 1 March 2022
- Recorded: 28 February 2022
- Genre: Folk
- Length: 2:20 (YouTube)
- Songwriter: Taras Borovok

"Bayraktar" is a Ukrainian patriotic military propaganda song released on 1 March 2022 during the Russian invasion of Ukraine. Dedicated to the Baykar Bayraktar TB2 combat drone due to its successful deployment against Russian troops, the song is written by Ukrainian soldier Taras Borovok, and mocks both the Russian Armed Forces and the invasion itself.

The song got positive critical acclaim from journalists, and received a humorous Oscar from the Ukrainian Ground Forces. "Bayraktar" is played frequently on Ukrainian radio, and sung by Ukrainians in protests.

== Background ==
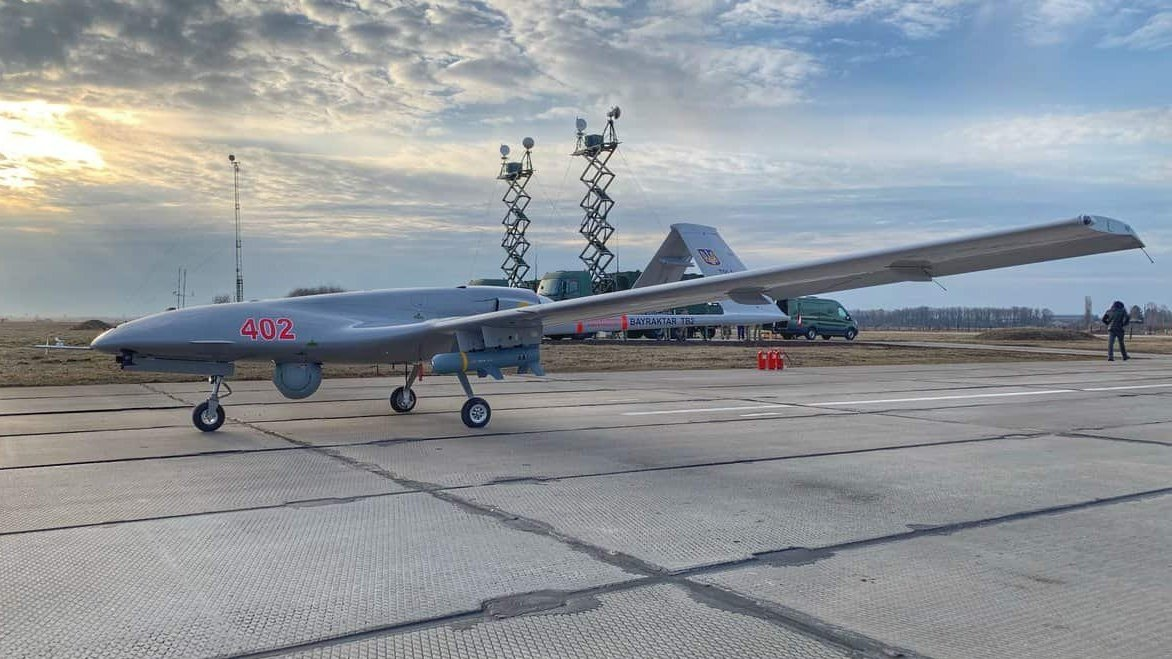
A Bayraktar TB2 of the Ukrainian Air Force

The song is dedicated to the Turkish Baykar Bayraktar TB2 combat drone, which was used by the Ukrainian Army during the 2022 Russian invasion of Ukraine. The use of the drones is reported to have slowed the Russian advance into the country.

The song was written and composed by Ukrainian soldier Taras Borovok. In an interview to Turkish press, Borovok said that he received a request from the Armed Forces of Ukraine to prepare a video about Bayraktar on the day the invasion began, but he decided it would be better to write a song instead. It took him "15 to 20 minutes" to write the lyrics, and "1.5 to 2 hours" to complete the whole song. Speaking to Euronews, Borovok said that the goal of the song was to "influence people, keep morale high and reduce Russian influence." He also pointed out that the song is propaganda.

== Lyrics and music video ==
"Bayraktar" was uploaded to YouTube on 1 March 2022. It has been named a patriotic propaganda and folk song by media outlets. The lyrics praise the Bayraktar drones and talk about how they serve as a punishment to the invading Russian Armed Forces. The song also mocks the Russian Army itself, the equipment used by them, their invasion of Ukraine, and the soup they consume. In numerous music videos, the song is accompanied by footage taken by a Bayraktar TB2's gun camera, showing strikes on columns of Russian equipment in the territory of Ukraine.

The invaders came to us in Ukraine,
With brand new uniforms, military vehicles,
But their inventory melted a bit.

Bayraktar, Bayraktar

Russian tankmen hid in the bushes,
To sip the f'ing cabbage soup with their best shoe,
But the broth overheated in the bushes a bit.

Bayraktar, Bayraktar

Sheep came to us from the east,
To "reestablish a great state,"
But the best shepherds of sheep flocks are:

Bayraktar, Bayraktar

Their arguments are all kinds of weapons,
Powerful rockets, machines of iron.
We have a comment to all of the arguments:

Bayraktar, Bayraktar

They wanted to capture us right away
But we took offense at the orcs.
Russian bandits are made into ghosts by:

Bayraktar, Bayraktar

Russian police are starting a criminal case
Against the killer of ruscists, but no traces found.
Who is to blame there is a grouse in our field?

Bayraktar, Bayraktar

The Kremlin freak conducts propaganda.
The people swallow the words.
Now their Tzar knows a new word:

Bayraktar

== Reception and legacy ==
Spencer Kornhaber from The Atlantic called the song "very catchy", emphasizing its "simple beat". Antoni Aguera from Última Hora named it an "iconic resistance song". Jochen Siemens of Stern said that the music video, showing explosions, is "one of the most haunting you've ever seen", but added that the song was sung "almost happily and confidently." On the day of the 94th Academy Awards, the Ukrainian Ground Forces awarded the music video of the song with a "humorous" Oscar in the category Best International Feature Film via Twitter.

The song became a symbol of resistance in Ukraine. Taner Doğan of the London School of Economics said that both the song and the drone had "developed a special relationship" between Ukraine and Turkey, and that the release of the song was "perceived with pride by pro-government Turkish media." According to the Algemeen Dagblad, the song is one of the things that shows that Selçuk Bayraktar, the chief technology officer of Baykar, is the "second-biggest hero" of Ukraine after Ukrainian president Volodymyr Zelenskyy. "Bayraktar" is repeatedly played on Ukrainian radio stations, and is sung by Ukrainians during protests against the invasion, as well as by soldiers in the front lines. The song has been translated into several languages, while several remixes also exist. It has been shared on the official Facebook page of the Ukrainian Ground Forces.

An online radio station playing war songs has been named after the Bayraktar drone due to the popularity of the song. According to Gabriel Gavin from The Spectator, the song had over a million views on YouTube before being taken down. A college professor in Bilohirsk, Crimea, was fired in September 2022 for playing the song in the auditorium of the school.

The song's popularity led to emergence of the term bayraktarshchyna (Ukrainian: байрактарщина), a portmanteau of Bayraktar and sharovarshchyna, which is used to describe low-quality Ukrainian mass culture products with patriotic undertones.

== See also ==
- Russian warship, go fuck yourself
- Ghost of Kyiv
- Turkey–Ukraine relations
