= Order of the Stallion =

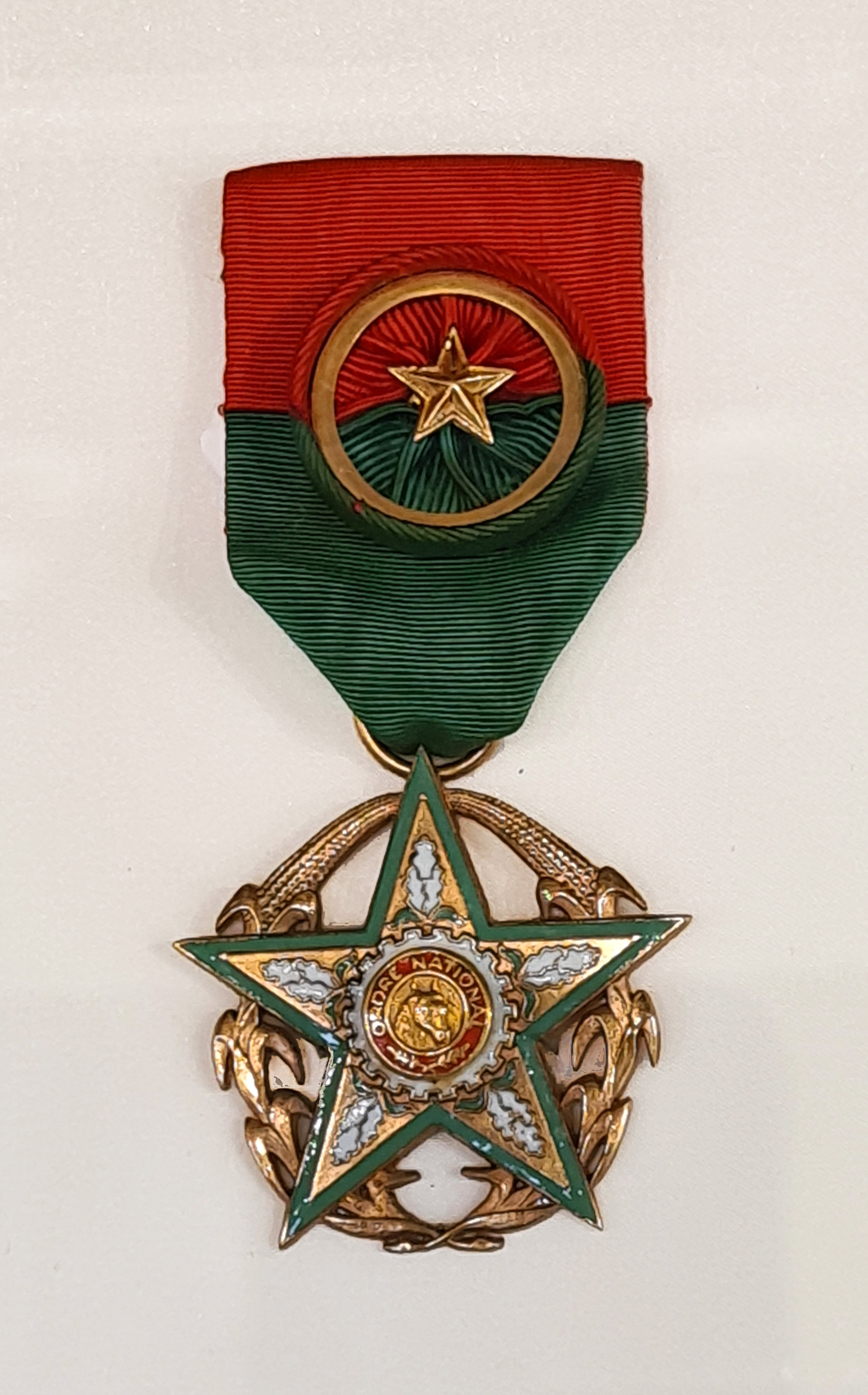
Officer's Insignia of the National Order of Burkina Faso.

The Order of the Stallion is a Burkinabè honorary order that rewards personal merit and outstanding civil or military service to the nation. It is the highest distinction in Burkina Faso. It was created in 2017 to replace the National Order of Burkina Faso.

== Historical ==
In September 2017, Following a workshop organised by the Grand Chancellery of the Burkinabè Orders, the decision was made to replace the National Order of Burkina Faso with the Order of the Stallion. This change was made to renew and modernise the Burkinabè Orders, on the recommendation of the Conference of Grand Chancelleries of the National Orders of Francophone Sub-Saharan Africa and France, so that the orders of each country reflect its specific culture.

== Composition ==
Just like the national order of Burkina Faso, the Order of the Stallion has 3 grades and 2 dignities:

Grades
Knight	Officer	Commander	Grand officer	Grand Cross

== Recipients ==
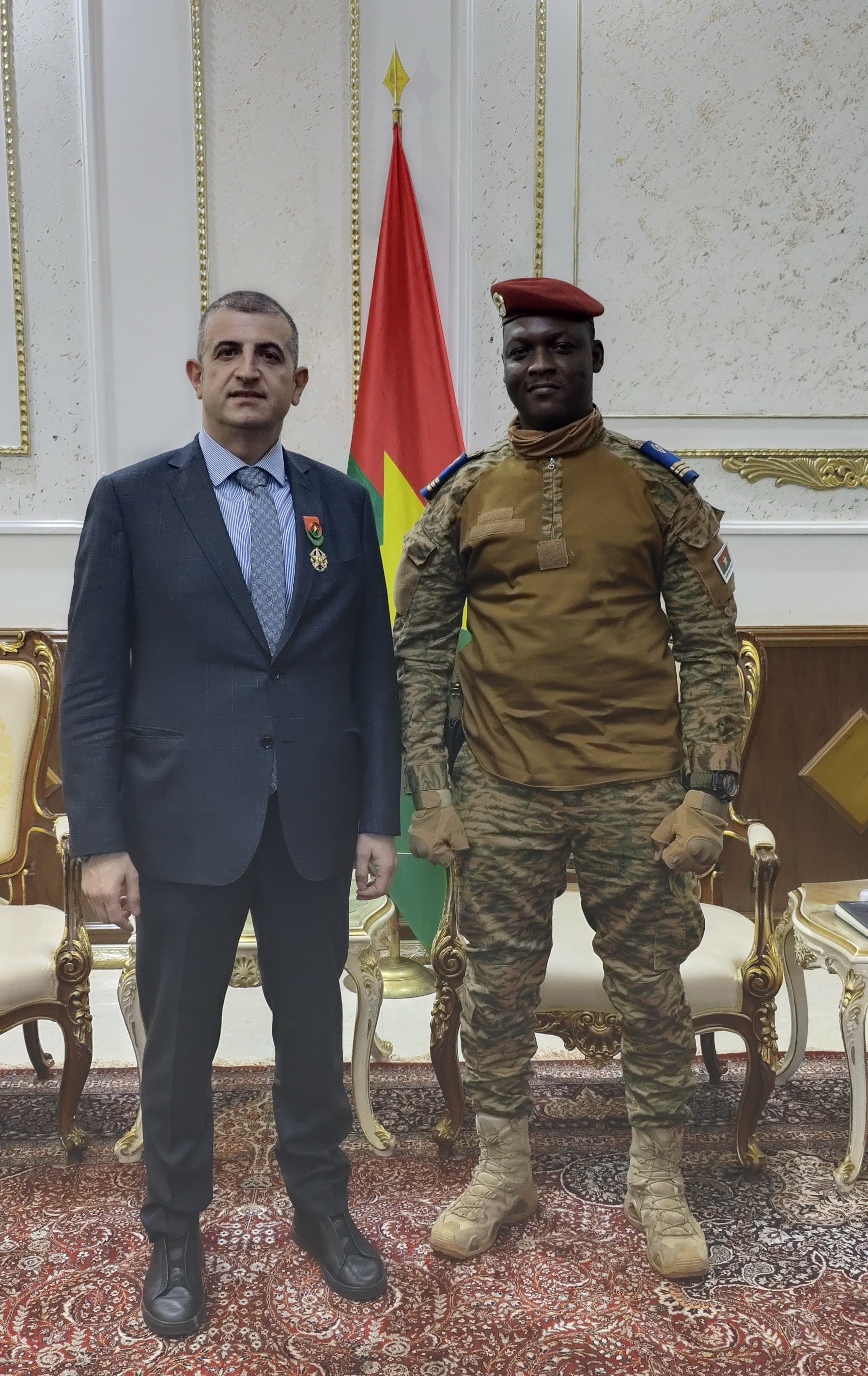
Bayraktar with Burkinabe President Ibrahim Traoré.

The heads of state of Burkina Faso are all automatically elevated to the dignity of Grand Cross of the Order of the Stallion when they come to power, occupying the position of "Grand Master of the Burkinabè Orders".

=== Knight ===
- Paul-Miki Roamba, Burkinabe journalist (2022)

=== Officer ===
- Olivia Rouamba, Burkinabe minister (2022)

=== Commander ===
- Paul Kaya, Congolese minister and international civil servant.
- Sergey Lavrov, Russian Minister of Foreign Affairs (2024)
- Haluk Bayraktar, CEO of Baykar
