= T3 Foundation =

Turkish foundation

Turkey Technology Team Foundation
- Founded: 12 December 2016
- Type: Non-governmental organization
- Headquarters: Istanbul, Turkey
- Chairman of the Board of Directors: Haluk Bayraktar
- Chairman of the Board of Trustees: Selçuk Bayraktar
- Website: turkiyeteknolojitakimi.org

Turkey Technology Team Foundation, T3 or T Cube is a foundation established in 2016 with the aim of enabling individuals in Turkey to participate in the development processes of technological products and supporting research and development and entrepreneurial activities to be carried out within the country.

== History ==
It was established under the leadership of Board of Trustees Chairman Selçuk Bayraktar and Board of Directors Chairman Haluk Bayraktar.

The foundation has stated its mission as developing and contributing to projects in various fields, ranging from supporting research and development projects and identifying and educating talented young people to developing an entrepreneurship culture in the field of technology, under the goal of "A Turkey That Produces Technology".

== Activities ==
The foundation describes its field of activity as follows:

1. Establishing technology teams consisting of students and young people in the field of technology development, training existing teams, organizing competitions and tournaments for teams, and supporting their participation in national and international competitions.
2. Providing scholarships within or outside Turkey to children and young people studying at educational institutions or conducting research and development in Turkey or other countries.
3. Establishing, constructing, managing, and operating educational institutions of every level and type; developing or supplying educational materials; providing instructors and teachers to educational institutions; or providing support in these areas.
4. Engaging in all kinds of activities in the fields of technology and science; organizing panels, seminars, fairs, conferences, talks, and competitions; and publishing materials.
5. Supporting the research and development processes of young people, scientists, and entrepreneurs working in the field of technology development, and providing them with financial support to participate in meetings, seminars, symposia, conferences, and competitions in Turkey and abroad.
6. Establishing project collaborations with individuals and/or institutions and organizations.
7. Supporting national/international ventures or entrepreneurs and encouraging entrepreneurs to work and invest in these fields.
8. Establishing and managing incubation centers and accelerator-like structures to support technological ventures and projects, and carrying out activities that encourage investors to become partners in these ventures and projects.

== Projects ==
=== TEKNOFEST ===
Teknofest Aerospace and Technology Festival is Turkey's first and only aviation, space, and technology festival, organized with the support of the Türkiye Technology Team Foundation, the Ministry of Industry and Technology, and numerous stakeholder institutions.

=== Deneyap workshops ===
These are technology workshops where free training is provided to middle and high school students in 10 core technology fields over a period of 36 months. The training provided at the workshops includes design and manufacturing, robotics and coding, electronic programming, and the Internet of Things. The Deneyap Technology Workshops, launched in 2017, produced their first graduates in 2020, with 363 students.

=== National Technology Scholarship Program ===
It is a scholarship program provided by the T3 Foundation to undergraduate, graduate, and doctoral students. Under the scholarship program, two types of scholarship recipients are selected: Instructor-Mentor and Volunteer.

=== T3 Entrepreneurship Center ===
It is a program that supports advanced-stage high-technology ventures in areas such as office space, technical expert support, opportunities for pilot implementation, training, and prototyping workshops. Autonomous technologies, artificial intelligence and machine learning, the Internet of Things, smart grids, and educational technologies are among the priority areas.
