= Medal for Services in Military Cooperation =

Award of the Azerbaijani Armed Forces

"For services in the field of military co-operation" medal
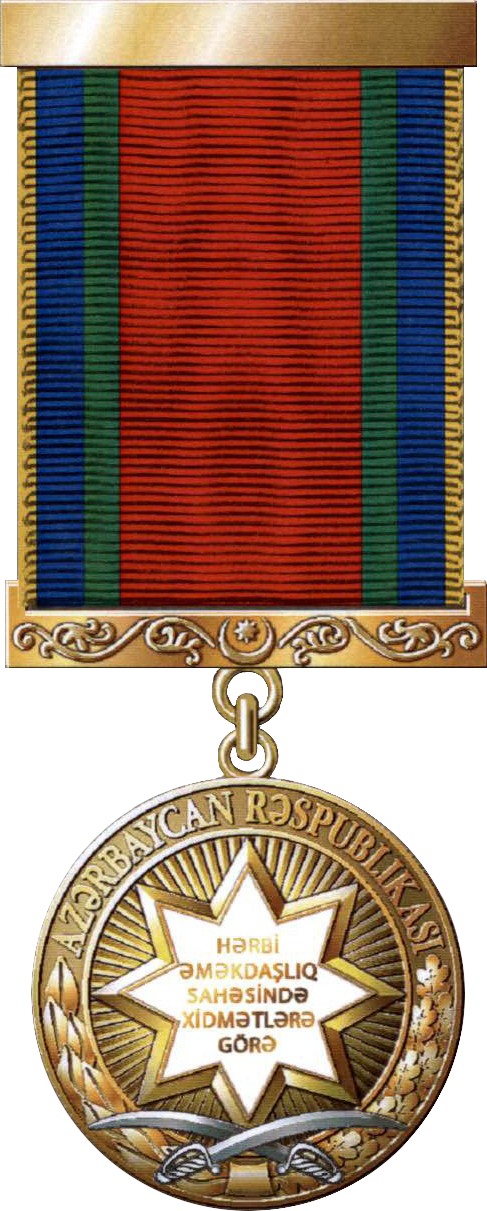
- Type: medal
- Awarded for: For services in military cooperation
- Country: Azerbaijan
- Presented by: the state
- Eligibility: active military service before May 17, 2002

Precedence
- Next (higher): Medal "For Distinguished Service at the Border"
- Next (lower): Medal "Veteran of the Armed Forces of the Republic of Azerbaijan"

Medal "For services in the field of military co-operation" (Azerbaijani: "Hərbi əməkdaşlıq sahəsində xidmətlərə görə" medalı) is a state award of Azerbaijan. The award was established on May 17, 2002, in accordance with the law numbered 328-IIQ.

== Awarding ==
The medal "For services in the field of military cooperation" is awarded to servicemen of the Azerbaijan Republic and foreign states and other persons for merits in strengthening military cooperation with the Azerbaijani Armed Forces.

== Description of the medal ==
The medal "For services in the field of military cooperation" consists of a narrow plate with a national ornament and another golden, round, bronze plate with a diameter of 35 mm. The front of the medal depicts a shield with an octagonal star on it. There are the words "Republic of Azerbaijan" above the shield, words "For services in the field of military cooperation" in the middle of the star, two crossed swords below the shield, wreaths of bay leaves on the left side and wreaths of oak leaves on the right side of the shield. There are relief rays between the inner contours of the circle and the outer contours of the star. The star is white, the swords are silver, and the rest of the images are gold. The back surface is smooth. The medal is attached to a rectangular patterned bright silk ribbon measuring 27 mm x 43 mm, which has an element for fastening to the collar of the dress, through a ring and a loop. 1 mm wide gold, 3 mm wide blue and red vertical stripes are depicted on patterned bright silk ribbon with green background from the edges to the center. The medal is accompanied by a 27 mm x 9 mm mold, pulled with the same patterned bright silk ribbon depicted crescent and star on it, with an element for fastening to the dress.
