= Karabakh Order =

Military order of Azerbaijan

Karabakh Order "Qarabağ" ordeni
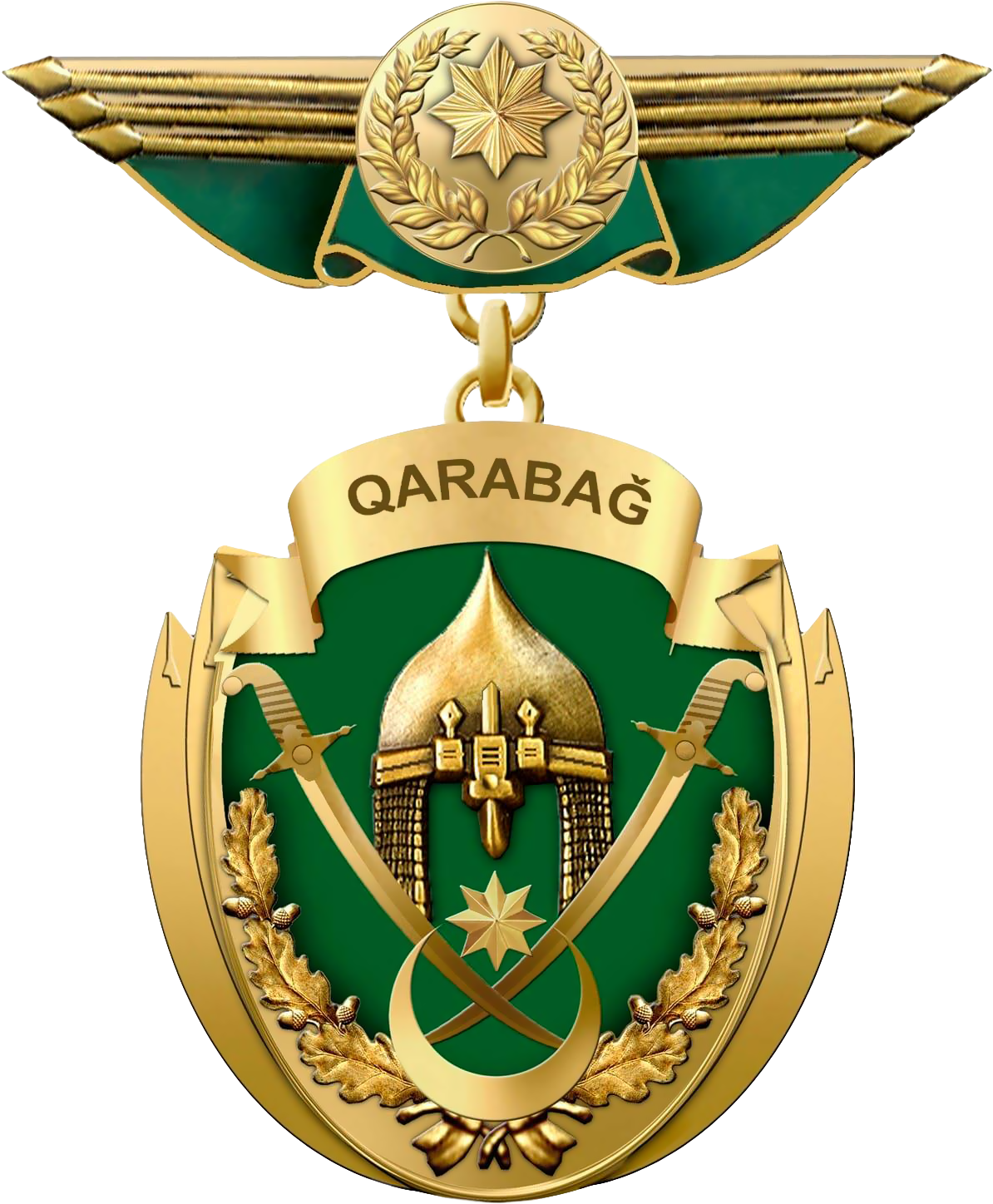
- Type: Individual award
- Awarded for: The courage shown in the destruction of manpower and equipment of the enemy, as well as in the performance of official duties in conditions of a real threat to life during the liberation of the occupied territories and the restoration of the state borders of Azerbaijan.
- Status: Active
- Established: 20 November 2020

Highlights
- Total: 204
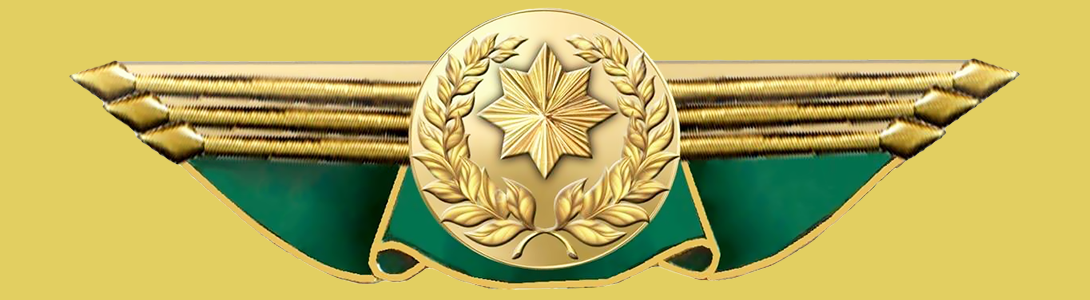

Precedence
- Next (higher): Victory Order
- Next (lower): Istiglal Order

Karabakh Order (Azerbaijani: "Qarabağ" ordeni) is an order of Azerbaijan. The order was created on the occasion of Azerbaijan being the victor in the Second Nagorno-Karabakh War.

== History ==
On 11 November 2020, the President of Azerbaijan, Ilham Aliyev, at a meeting with wounded Azerbaijani servicemen who took part in the Second Nagorno-Karabakh War, said that new orders and medals would be established in Azerbaijan, and that he gave appropriate instructions on awarding civilians and servicemen who showed "heroism on the battlefield and in the rear and distinguished themselves in this war." He also proposed the names of these orders and medals. On 20 November 2020, at a plenary session of the Azerbaijani National Assembly, a draft bill on amendments to the bill "On the establishment of orders and medals of the Republic of Azerbaijan" was submitted for discussion.

The Karabakh Order was established on the same day in the first reading in accordance with the bill "On the establishment of orders and medals of the Republic of Azerbaijan" on the occasion of Azerbaijan being the victor in the Second Nagorno-Karabakh War.

=== Awarding ===
On 9 December, the President of Azerbaijan, Ilham Aliyev signed a decree to award 204 servicemen, 48 of them posthumously with the Karabakh Order. The awardees included Mais Barkhudarov, Hikmat Hasanov, Arzu Rahimov, Nizam Osmanov, and Shahin Mammadov. On April 1, 2021, Selçuk Bayraktar awarded with the order. In June 2021, Baykar’s CEO Haluk Bayraktar awarded Karabakh Order by President İlham Aliyev in Shusha.

== Status ==
The Karabakh Order will be awarded for the "courage shown in the destruction of manpower and equipment of the enemy, as well as in the performance of official duties in conditions of a real threat to life during the liberation of the occupied territories and the restoration of the state borders of Azerbaijan". According to the bill "On the establishment of orders and medals of the Republic of Azerbaijan", the medal's senior award is the Victory Order, while its junior award is the Istiglal Order.
