= Baykar Bayraktar TB2 =

Turkish unmanned combat aerial vehicle

Bayraktar TB2 / Bayraktar TB2T-AI
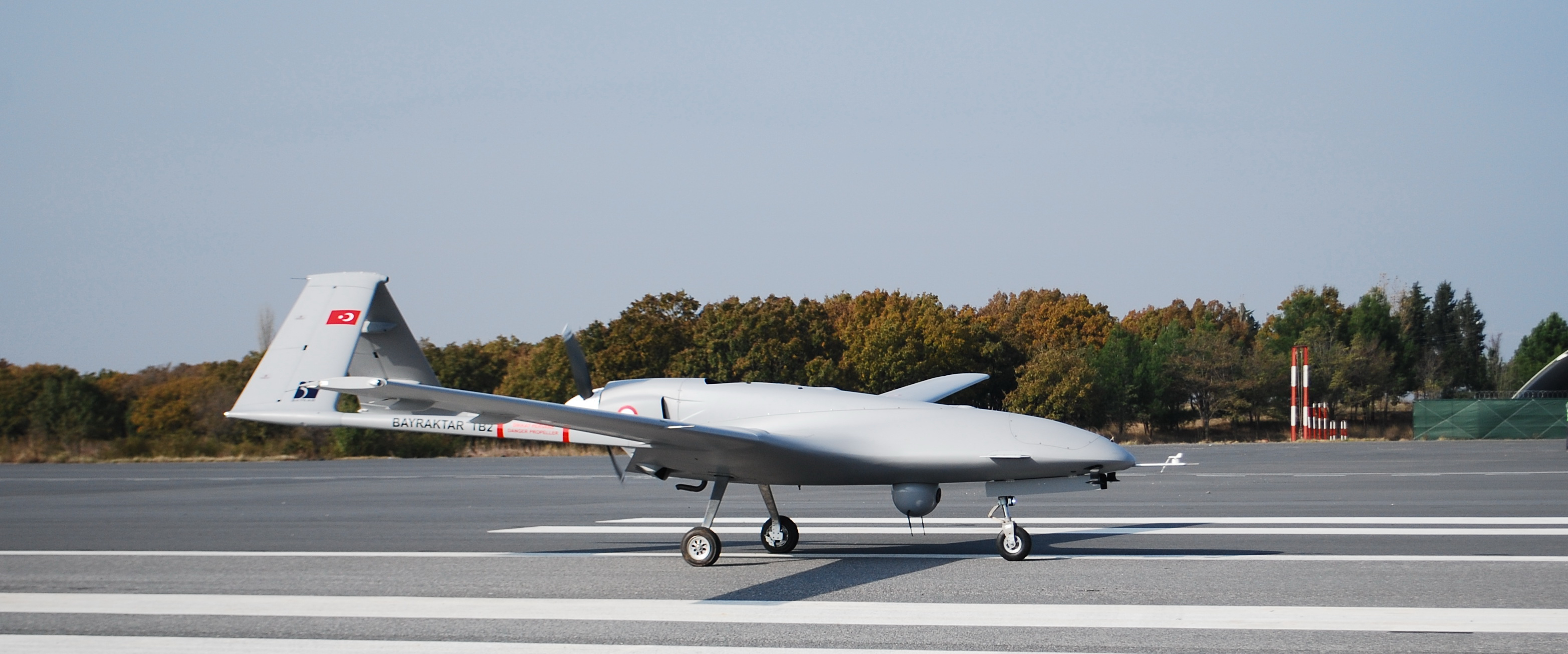
- Bayraktar TB2 of the Turkish Air Force

General information
- Type: Unmanned combat aerial vehicle
- National origin: Turkey
- Manufacturer: Baykar
- Status: In service
- Primary users: Turkey Azerbaijan; Ukraine; See Operators
- Number built: >800

History
- First flight: August 2014; 12 years ago
- Developed from: Baykar Bayraktar TB1
- Developed into: Baykar Bayraktar TB3

Bayraktar TB2 (Turkish: Standard-bearer TB2) is a family of medium-altitude long-endurance (MALE) unmanned combat aerial vehicles (UCAV) capable of remotely controlled or autonomous flight operations. It is manufactured by the Turkish company Baykar for the Turkish Armed Forces and export markets. The aircraft are monitored and controlled by an aircrew in a ground control station, including weapons employment. The development of the UAV has been largely credited to Selçuk Bayraktar, a former MIT graduate student along with his brother Haluk Bayraktar. It is the first UCAV in the world to successfully perform a barrel roll and an autonomous spin recovery maneuver. It is the most produced and export-successful UCAV in the world. Baykar has a production capacity of 250 Bayraktar TB2s per year and is aiming to increase the production capacity to 500 per year. Baykar will start a production line for the Bayraktar TB2 along with the Bayraktar Akıncı at its Italy-based subsidiary, Piaggio Aerospace. New production lines for the Bayraktar TB2 are going to start by the equal joint venture company established by Baykar and Leonardo known as LBA Systems, along with the Bayraktar TB3, Bayraktar Akıncı and Bayraktar Kızılelma.

By December 2024, the TB2 drone had completed 1 million flight hours globally. The largest operator of TB2 drones is the Turkish military, and the drone was exported to the militaries of at least 34 other countries. Turkey has used the drone extensively in strikes on Kurdistan Workers' Party (PKK) and People's Protection Units (YPG) targets in Iraq and Syria. Bayraktar drones were later deployed by a number of other nations around the world in various wars, such as by Azerbaijan in the Second Nagorno-Karabakh War, by the Armed Forces of Ukraine during the Russian invasion of Ukraine, as well as by the Ethiopian National Defense Force during the Tigray war.

Bayraktar TB2 played a fundamental role in Turkey's development of a new military tactic and initiated a wave of change in modern military doctrines. It was accepted as the initiator of a new method of war by many military analysts and strategists, including the political scientist Francis Fukuyama.

== Development ==
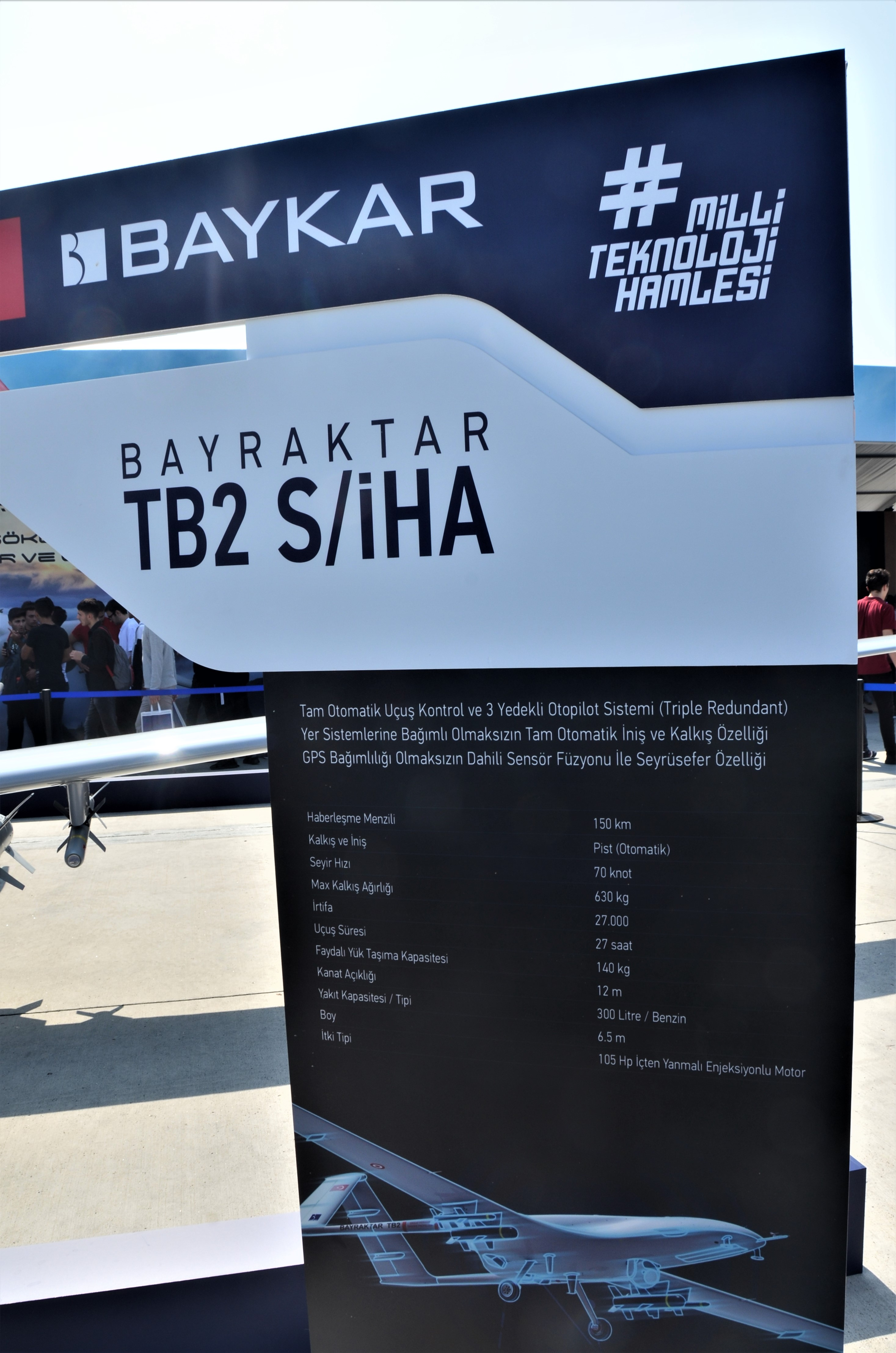
Bayraktar TB2 technical specifications in Turkish

The development of the Bayraktar TB2 was spurred by a U.S. ban on exports of armed unmanned aircraft to Turkey due to concerns that they would be used against PKK groups inside and outside Turkey.

Baykar started developing a new combat tactical aerial vehicle system at the request of the Presidency of Defense Industries, after the experiences of its first tactical UAV, the Bayraktar Çaldıran or Bayraktar TB1, delivered to the Turkish army in 2011. The Bayraktar TB2 made its maiden flight in August 2014. On 18 December 2015, a video was published of a test firing of a missile from the Bayraktar TB2, a result of a collaboration with Roketsan. Roketsan's MAM and TUBITAK-SAGE's BOZOK laser-guided bombs were tested for the first time.

=== Components and technologies ===
The aircraft previously relied on imported and regulated components and technologies such as Rotax 912 engines (manufactured in Austria) and optoelectronics (FLIR sensors imported from Wescam in Canada or Hensoldt from Germany). Bombardier Recreational Products, owner of Rotax, suspended delivery of their engines to certain countries in October 2020, after becoming aware of their military use despite being certified for civil use only.

According to the British newspaper The Guardian, the arming of the Bayraktar TB2 would not have been possible without the help of the UK Hornet micro-munitions bomb rack by EDO MBM Technology Ltd. The bomb rack was provided to Turkey in 2015, and a variant of it was integrated into the aircraft by EDO MBM and Roketsan. In response to The Guardian newspaper article, Baykar Chief Technical Officer Selçuk Bayraktar denied that the bomb rack came from the UK. "We are not buying it from you, we never did. It not only does not work under any circumstances but is also very expensive", Bayraktar said on Twitter. "We have designed and manufactured a more advanced and cost-effective one ourselves."

On 19 August 2020 the UK Department for International Trade (DIT) disclosed details of a six-year history of exports of the Hornet bomb rack to Turkey between 2014 and 2020, suggesting that supply of the critical technology to Turkey had continued well beyond the development stage of the Bayraktar TB2 and right up to the publication of the Guardian story in November 2019. 18 Standard Individual Export Licence (SIEL) applications were submitted by EDO MBM Technology between 2014 and 2020 for exports of goods 'related to Hornet Bomb Racks / Hornet Missile Launchers' for end-users in Turkey. Of these, 16 of the licences were granted.

In October 2020, the drone's use of the Canadian Wescam MX-15D system was disclosed after Armenian officials claimed that remains of a MX-15D system had been recovered from a downed TB2 drone during the nation's conflict with Azerbaijan. That triggered the stopping of MX-15D exports to Turkey while an investigation by Global Affairs Canada evaluates the use of Canadian technology in the Nagorno-Karabakh conflict. Turkish industry responded to foreign sales boycotts by announcing provision of domestically manufactured alternatives, including the TM100 (manufactured by Bayker) and TEI-PD170 (manufactured by TEI) engines, fuel valves, and the Aselsan CATS FLIR system (manufactured by Aselsan). Turkish defense industry researcher Kadir Doğan tweeted that cancellation of sales of components to Baykar by foreign companies did not pose a major problem, and that, as of January 2021, all of those components have been replaced by locally manufactured alternatives.

While the initial alternative Aselsan CATS electro-optical turret faced problems in export market regarding its weight (61 kg) compared to the Wescam MX-15D (45 kg), Aselsan developed a successor system, the Aselsan ASELFLIR-500, to address these performance parameters. The ASELFLIR-500 offers improved performance with a reduced weight of approximately 52 kg. The system has since been integrated into the Bayraktar TB2 and other platforms. The system features a 4096x2880 high-definition camera, alongside high-definition MWIR and SWIR sensors for long-range detection. Following its development, ASELSAN exported ASELFLIR 500 system to more than 20 countries including NATO members.

== Characteristics ==
=== Design ===
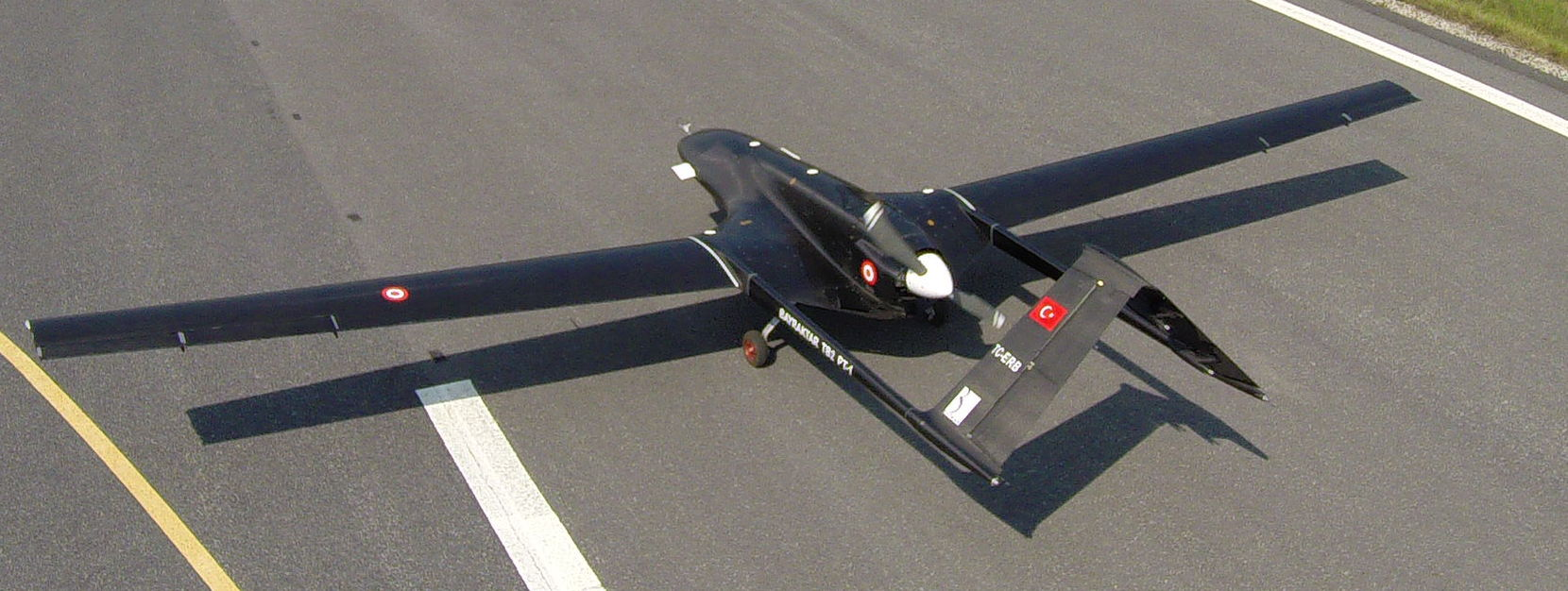
Bayraktar TB2 first trial flights

The Bayraktar TB2 platform has a blended wing body design with an inverted V-tail structure. Thrust is generated by a variable pitch two-blade propeller in pusher configuration. The propeller is mounted between the tail booms and driven by an internal combustion engine located in the body. The monocoque platform is modular with detachable main items such as wing, tail boom, and V-tails. Fuselage pieces are made mostly of carbon fiber composite with machined aluminum parts at joints. Fuel is stored within bladder tanks and fuel consumption is balanced with solenoid valves.

The ground control station (GCS) is based on a NATO-spec shelter unit, which is equipped with cross-redundant command and control systems. The mobile unit supports three personnel: pilot, payload operator, and mission commander. The GCS is equipped with redundant air conditioners and nuclear, biological, and chemical filtration (NBC) filtering units. All hardware inside the shelter is placed inside racked cabinets. Each operator has dual screens in front, along with the operator interface software used for real-time command, control, and monitoring.

While the Turkish Armed Forces describe Bayraktar TB2 as "Tactical UAV Class" to prevent it from being a competitor to the TAI Anka UAV, international standards would classify it as a medium-altitude long-endurance UAV.

=== Configuration ===
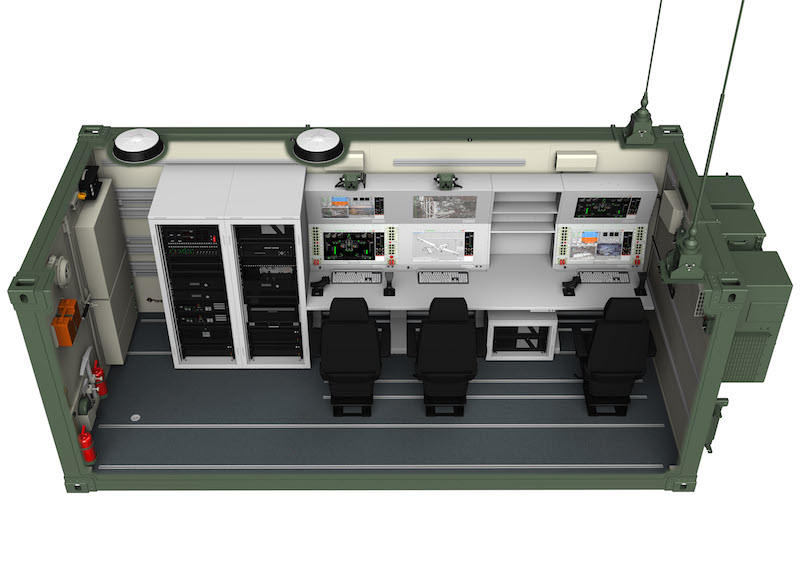
Bayraktar TB2 Ground Control Station System

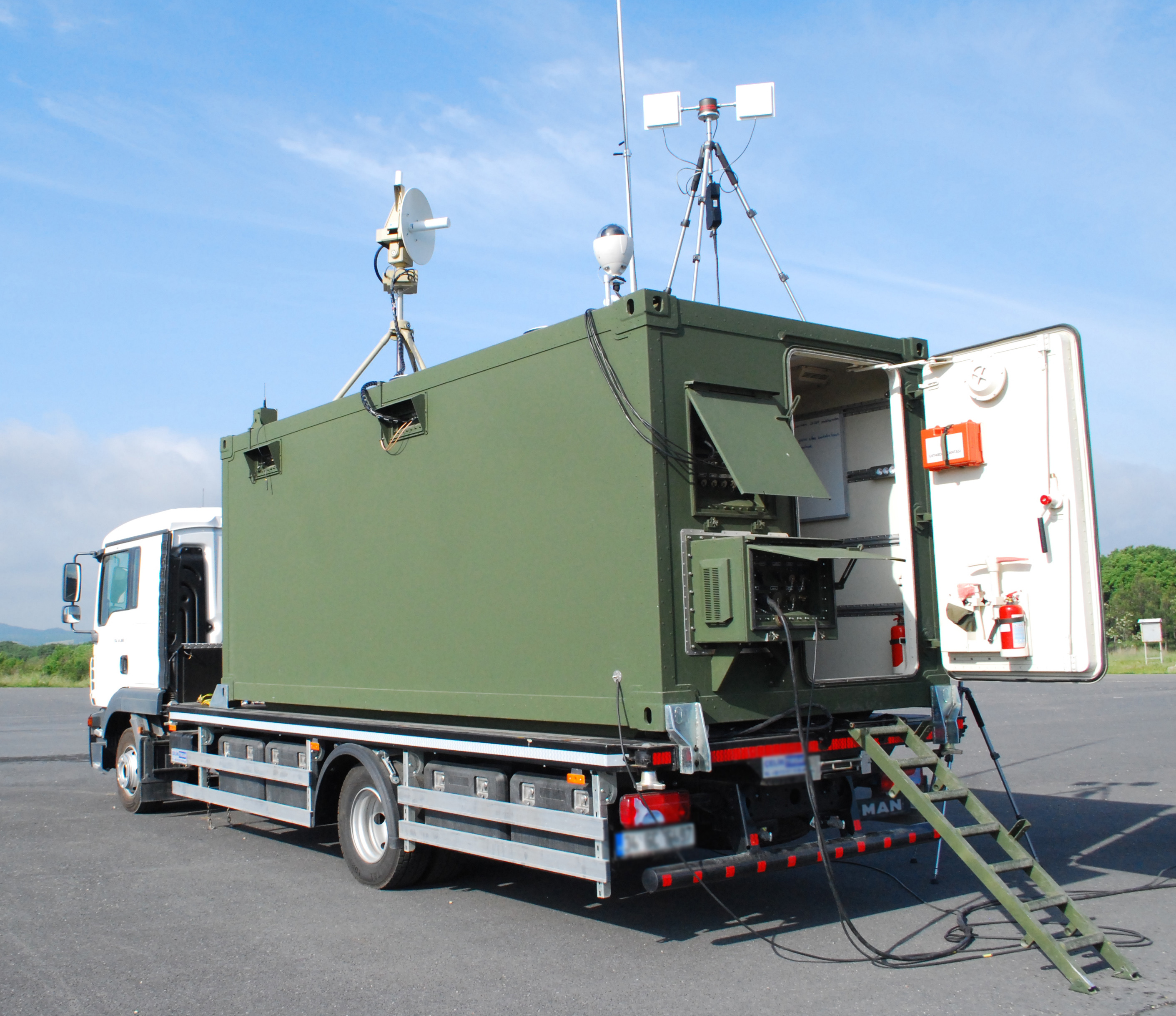
Bayraktar ground control station on a mobile platform

Each TB2 is configured with six aerial vehicle platforms, two ground control stations, three ground data terminals (GDT), two remote video terminals (RVT), and ground support equipment. Each aerial platform is equipped with a triply-redundant avionics system. Its ground control system's cross-redundant architecture allows for pilot, payload operator, and mission commander to command, control, and monitor the platform.

=== Digital flight control system ===
The TB2 has a triple-redundant flight control system with autonomous taxi, takeoff, cruise, landing, and parking capability. The computerized flight control system is the primary component, programmed with sensor fusion algorithms that act on real-time sensor data. Mission-specific controls are handled through the mission-control computer system. The aerial platform is guided using various redundant rotary and linear servo actuators. All of the main airborne avionics equipment, software, and hardware are under constant development.

The electronic power supply for the onboard systems is supported with triple alternators and balanced, smart lithium-ion battery units. A ruggedized heated camera unit is placed in the tail section of the platform to monitor flight, and all payload and telemetry data are saved to the airborne data recorder. The redundant architecture of the avionics supports autonomous emergency landings on different airfields if necessary. Sensor fusion algorithms, including an inertial navigation system, allow navigation and auto landing even with loss of global positioning signals.

=== Price ===
Baykar has not stated a price, but has republished on its website several news reports about crowdfunding campaigns launched in 2022 in Europe to buy Bayraktar UAVs for Ukraine, all of them fixing a goal of around US$5–5.5 million for the unit.

That is around one-sixth of the price for the US-built Reaper UAV, albeit with the TB2 capable of carrying only one-tenth the payload of the Reaper.

== Operational history ==
=== Turkey ===
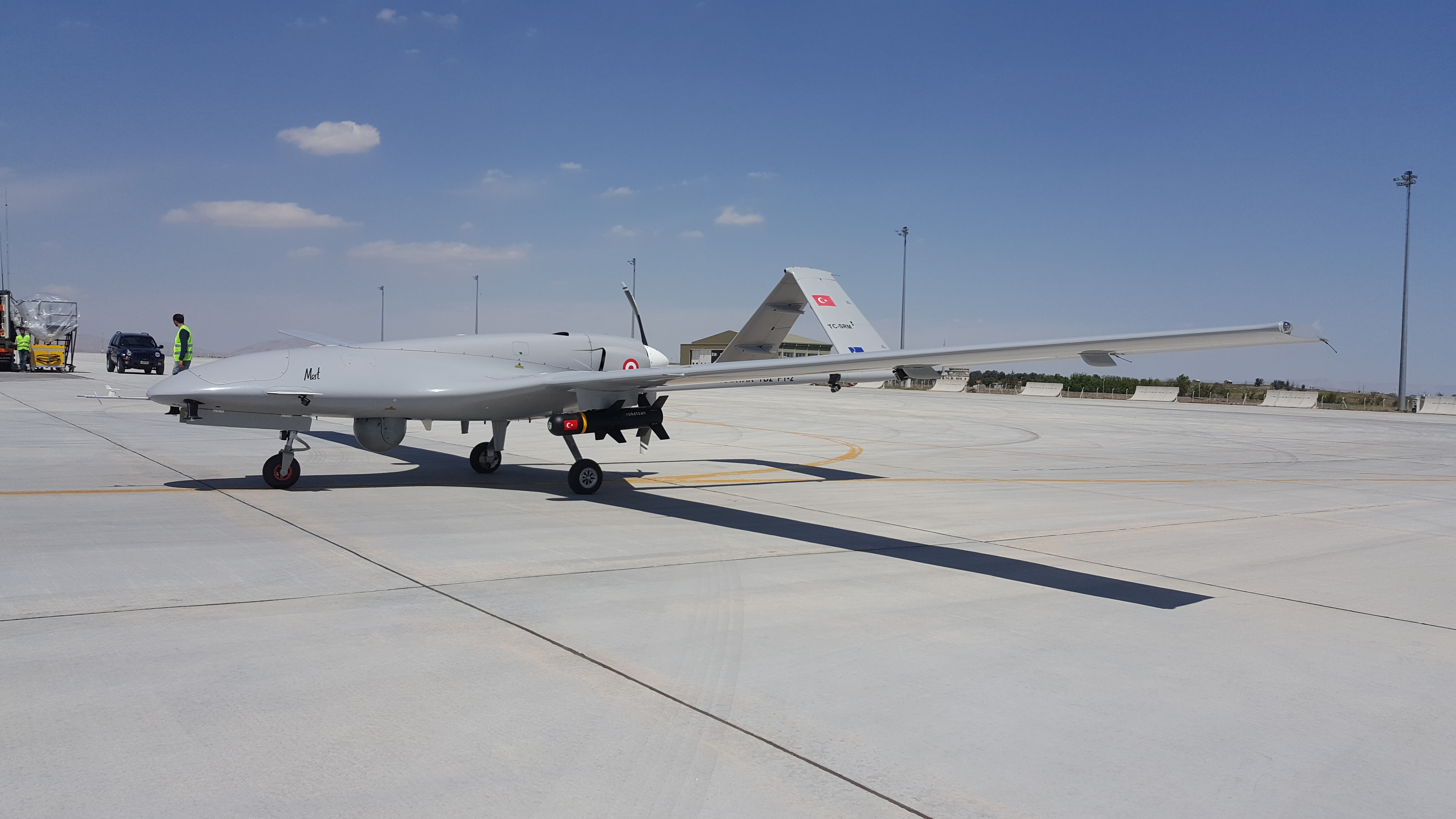
Bayraktar TB2 loaded with MAM-L

The Turkish military's use of the TB2 gained prominence in counterinsurgency operations against sites of the Kurdistan Workers' Party (PKK) and People's Protection Units (YPG) that were in Iraq and Syria.

On 30 June 2018, one Turkish Air Force Bayraktar TB2 crashed due to technical problems in Hatay province, Turkey.

On 15 August 2018, Turkish Land Forces successfully used a Bayraktar TB2 in a joint cross-border operation, of the Turkish Armed Forces and the National Intelligence Organization of Turkey, to kill the senior (PKK) leader and board member of the Kurdistan Communities Union İsmail Özden in Sinjar District, northwestern Iraq.

On 16 May 2021, one Bayraktar TB2 crashed in Zebari, northern Iraq; Kurdish militants claimed to have shot down the drone.

A total of 37 Turkish Bayraktar TB2s successfully flew over 1551 hours in the earthquake zone of the 2023 Turkey-Syria earthquake. The drones have been instrumental in providing continuous updates and data to the crisis-response team for damage detection and search-and-rescue support, along with coordination activities.

On 20 June 2023, a Turkish Bayraktar TB2 drone crashed in Qandil, northern Iraq. The wreck fell in an area under Kurdish militia control.

==== Turkish use in Syria ====
In March 2020 Bayraktar TB2s, Anka-S UAVs, and an array of Koral electronic jammers were deployed and extensively used in coordinated action to strike Syrian army targets on the ground during Operation Spring Shield, launched by Turkey following losses the Turkish forces incurred at the hands of the Russian forces in northwestern Syria at the end of February 2020. In this operation, in which Turkish forces used TB-2s in large numbers, they virtually "blinded" enemy radars and neutralized Syrian air defense systems such as Pantsir and Buk. As a result, the attacks of the Assad regime forces, supported by Russia and Iran, on Idlib were forced to stop. The deployment was assessed by experts to be a success and a tactical game-changer.

During the week of fighting, Turkish drones took out 73 Syrian armed vehicles with 405 Syrians troops including 30 high ranking officers. The OSINT Oryx Blog, in its research according to open sources, found 37 tanks of the T-55, T-62 and T-72 models, 9 BMP-1 armored combat vehicles, 16 2S1 Gvozdika howitzers, 1 122 mm howitzer 2A18 (D-30) gun, 3 M-46 guns, 1 152-mm howitzer M1943 (D-1) gun, 6 2S3 Akatsiya howitzers, 8 BM-21 Grad MLRS, 1 122mm HM-20 MLRS, 2 x 122mm MRL MLRS, 2 160mm M160 mortars, 1 240mm M240 mortar, 4 ZSU-23-4 armored anti-aircraft vehicles, 2 ZU-23-2 anti-aircraft guns, 1 S-75 Dvina surface-to-air anti-aircraft missile system, 2 Pantsir-S1 surface-to-air anti-aircraft and artillery systems, 1 SNR-125 air defense radar and 21 different types of trucks were destroyed in the TSK drone attack.The New Lines Institute reported that it received information from sources close to the American government, and that as a result of the Turkish Armed Forces' attack, the Syrian Army lost 3 warplanes, 3 UAVs, 8 helicopters, 135 tanks, 86 artillery and MLRS, 77 armored vehicles, 9 ammunition depots, 5 air defense systems, and 16 anti-tank and mortar positions. It was also stated that an average of 60 regime soldiers were thought to have been killed per day between February 27 and March 5. There is only visual evidence for three Bayraktar drones being shot down.

On 23 August 2020, another Bayraktar TB2 drone was shot down by Syrian air defenses near Kafr Nabl, Idlib, after being detected spotting targets for Syrian rebels.

In 2022, Turkish drone strikes, including Bayraktar drones, killed 50 SDF fighters and 10 civilians.

=== Libya ===
In June 2019, international news media reported that Libya's UN-recognized Government of National Accord (GNA) used Bayraktar TB2s to strike an airbase held by General Haftar's Libyan National Army (LNA). Despite the UN embargo on Libya's ongoing civil war, it is suspected that at least 3 Bayraktar TB2s were being used over Tripoli by the government forces. Video evidence, as early as 11 June 2019, showed at least one TB2 flying over Tripoli about to land at Mitiga International Airport's military section, under control of GNA-allied forces. Turkish supplied TB-2s were successful against Pantsir air defense systems in Libya and destroyed 9 units.

- On 14 May 2019, a GNA TB2 was destroyed by LNA defenses in Al-Jufra area.
- On 6 June 2019, two GNA TB2s were destroyed by LNA attacks on Mitiga Airport.
- On 30 June 2019, a TB2 was destroyed by LNA defenses.
- On 25 July 2019, two LNA Ilyushin Il-76TD cargo planes were destroyed on the ground in Al-Jufra Air base by an attack by TB2 drones. A GNA TB2 was shot down near al-Jufra airbase during the same attack.
- On 14 December 2019, a GNA TB2 was shot down in Ain Zara, Tripoli.
- On 2 January 2020, a GNA TB2 was shot down south of Mitiga Airport.
- On 22 January 2020, a TB2 drone, serial number T92, with GNA markings, was shot down by LNA forces after taking off from Mitiga Airport.
- On 25 February 2020, the LNA shot down a GNA TB2, providing a video of the wreck.
- On 26 February 2020, the LNA shot down another GNA TB2, later providing video of the wreck.
- On 28 February 2020, the LNA shot down two GNA TB2, near Tripoli, providing images of both wrecks.
- On 31 March 2020, the LNA shot down two GNA TB2 drones near Tripoli; one at Misrata Air College and another in Al-Tawaisha.
- On 11 April 2020, a GNA TB2 was shot down in Tarhuna.
- On 13 April 2020, a GNA TB2, serial number T94, was shot down near Mitiga Airport by LNA forces.
- On 17 April 2020, two GNA TB2 drones were shot down, one with serial number T95, near Bani Walid and another in Misratah.
- On 18 April 2020, a GNA TB2 was shot down by LNA forces south of Tripoli.
- On 2 May 2020, a GNA TB2 was destroyed at Arada, near Mitiga Airport, downed by LNA forces.
- On 12 May 2020, a GNA TB2 was shot down near Ash Shwayrif, Tripoli.
- On 21–23 May 2020, Libyan National Army's Pantsir missile system shot down three GNA drones, including one TAI Anka drone over Tarhuna city, and one TB2 over the al-Shuwairif area in southwest of Jabal al-Gharbi province and another TB2 in Qaryat.
- On 7 June 2020, two GNA TB2 drones were shot down by LNA forces near Sirte.
- By 1 July 2020, at least 16 TB2 drones were reported shot down or lost in Libya during six months of fighting and 23 were reported lost since LNA offensive in Western Libya that began in April 2019.

=== Azerbaijan ===
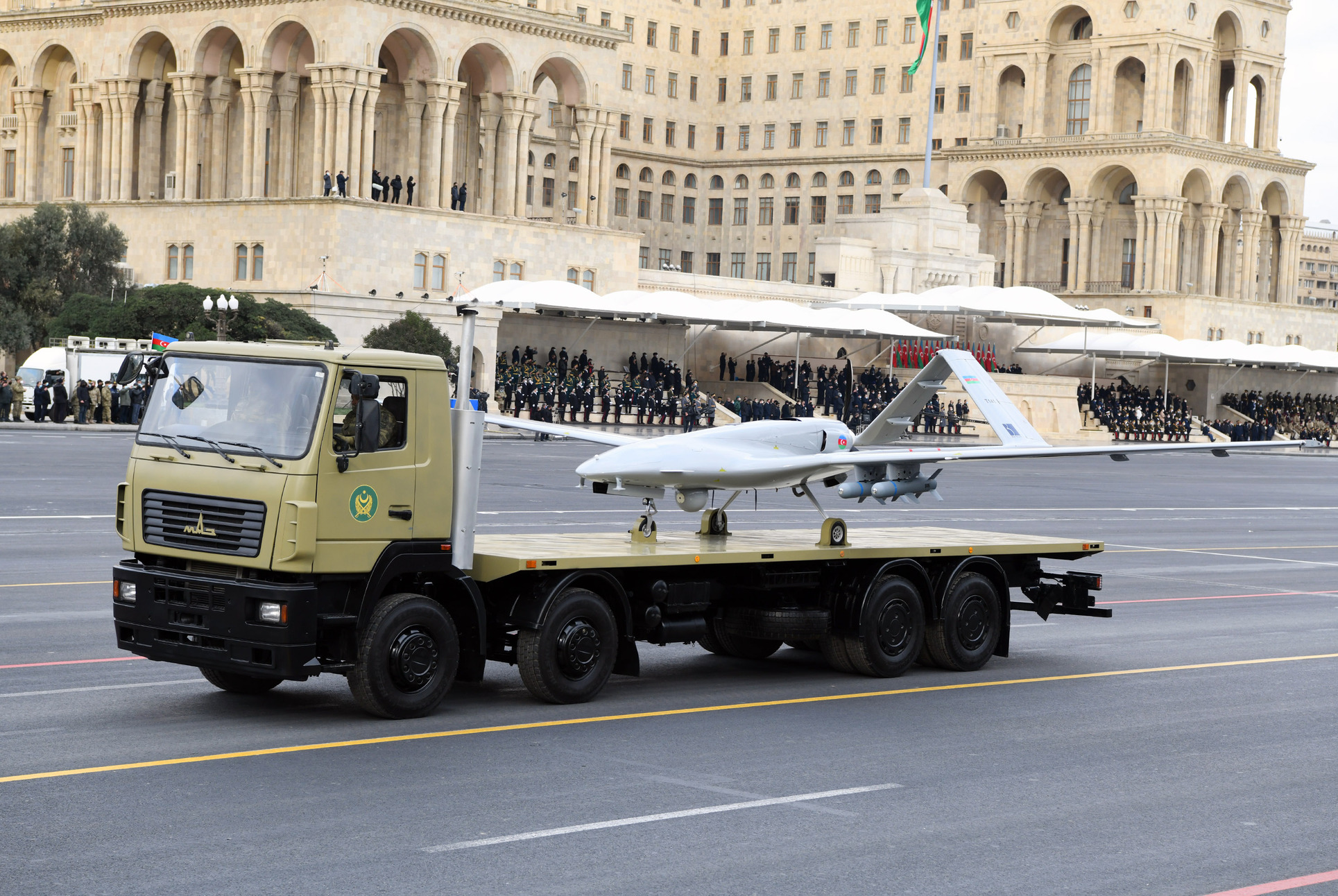
Bayraktar TB2 on display at the 2020 Victory Parade in Baku, Azerbaijan

In June 2020, the Defence Minister of Azerbaijan, Zakir Hasanov, announced that Azerbaijan had decided to purchase Bayraktar drones from Turkey. During the 2020 Nagorno-Karabakh war, Bayraktar TB2s were used against the Armed Forces of Armenia with great success. Azerbaijan used TB2s to destroy Armenian artillery, infantry positions, and military vehicles, including BM-30 Smerch MLRS, T-72 tanks, and BMP-1 and BMP-2 IFVs. Nine Osa and Strela-10 air defense systems were also destroyed by Azerbaijani drones, likely TB2s.

On 19 October 2020, a Bayraktar TB2 was shot down by air defenses of the Armenian army over Nagorno-Karabakh.

On 8 November 2020, another Azerbaijani Bayraktar TB2 was shot down by air defense, in southeastern Nagorno-Karabakh.

=== Ukraine ===
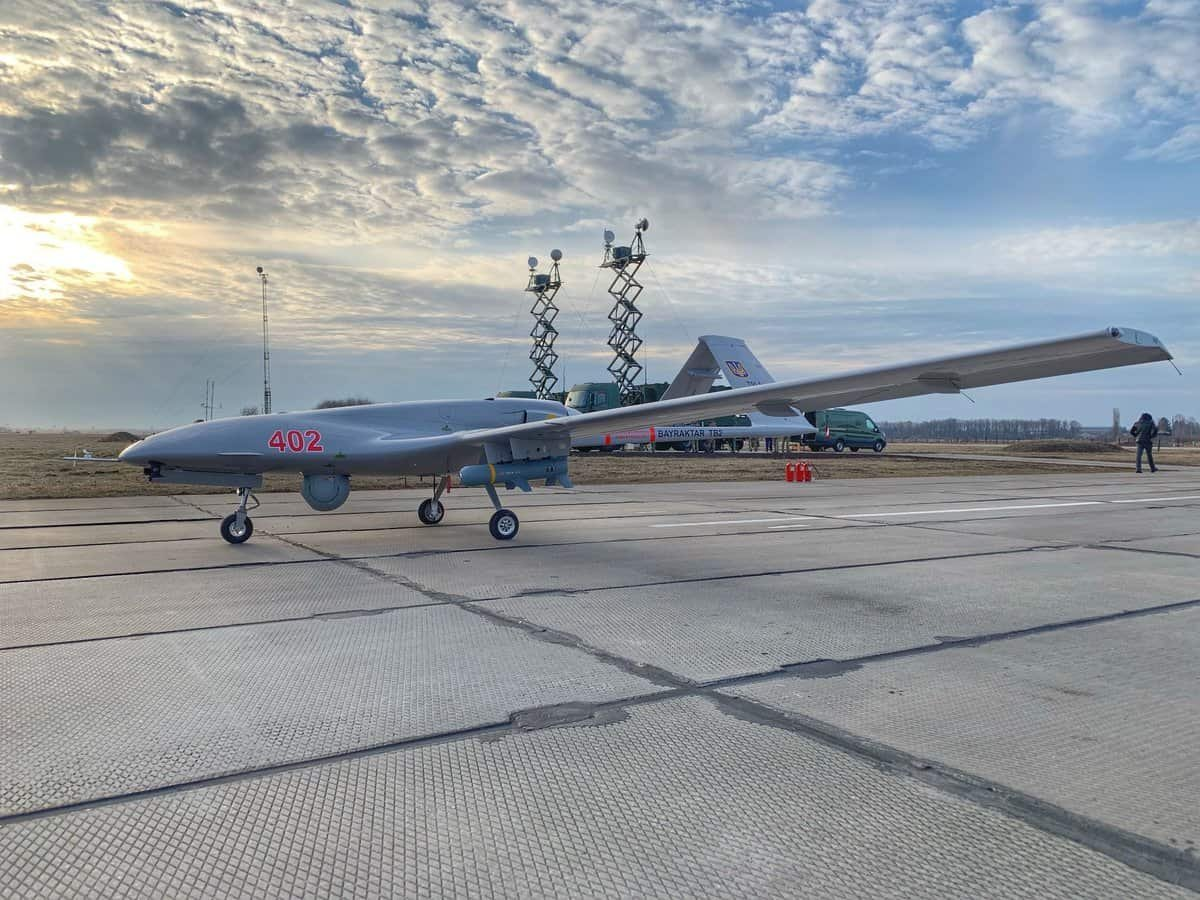
A Bayraktar TB2 of the Ukrainian Air Force armed with MAM-L; two ground control stations are in the background

As part of its military modernization program, the Armed Forces of Ukraine purchased 12 Bayraktar TB2s in 2019. In January 2019, Baykar signed an agreement with Ukrspetsproject, part of Ukroboronprom, for the purchase of six TB2s and 3 ground control stations worth US$69 million for the Ukrainian army. Ukraine received the first batch of the UAVs in March 2019. After successful testing of the aircraft, the Ukrainian Navy placed a separate order for six TB2s, to be delivered in 2021, according to navy officials. Meanwhile, Turkish and Ukrainian officials announced the establishment of a joint venture to produce 48 additional Bayraktar TB2s in Ukraine. The first batch of the Bayraktar TB2 complex was delivered to the navy in July 2021.

During a Russian military buildup in Crimea and near Ukraine's borders, a TB2 conducted a reconnaissance flight over the Donbas region on 9 April 2021. This was the first operational use of the aircraft by Ukrainian forces within an active conflict zone. In October 2021, a TB2 drone was used for the first time in combat during the war, targeting a Russian separatist artillery position, destroying a D-30 howitzer, and halting the bombardment of Ukrainian troops near Hranitne.

==== 2022 Russian invasion ====
During the 2022 Russian invasion of Ukraine, TB2 drones were used by Ukraine's armed forces against Russian forces and equipment. In January, prior to the invasion, the spokesperson for the air force command, Lt. Col. Yuri Ihnat, stated that "Ukraine has approximately 20 Bayraktar drones, but we will not stop there". On 2 March, Ukrainian defense minister Oleksii Reznikov announced the arrival of additional TB2 drones.

According to video footage released by the armed forces, TB2 drones have successfully destroyed, on different occasions, a Russian command post, military vehicles—including tanks, IFVs, and different types of trucks—surface-to-air missile systems (including Buk and Tor systems), self-propelled artillery, multiple rocket launcher (MLRS), howitzers, and an electronic warfare system. The drone also reportedly destroyed two Russian fuel trains, patrol boats, and a helicopter.

On 24 February, the day of invasion, four Bayraktar TB2 drones stationed at Chuhuiv Air base were abandoned and later destroyed on the ground by Ukrainian Forces, amid reported Russian rocket attacks. The People's Militia of the Luhansk People's Republic claimed it shot down two TB2 drones near the city of Luhansk. On 27 February, Ukraine's air force confirmed two strikes by TB2s on Russian convoys in the Kherson and Zhytomyr regions.

The chief of Ukraine's air force, Lieutenant General Mykola Oleschuk, called the UAV system "life-giving". The popularity of the drone in Ukraine led to a song, "Bayraktar", which praised the drone while also insulting the Russian army and its invasion.

Ukrainian drones appear to be equipped with anti-jamming antennas. They appear to use MAM-C and MAM-L laser-guided bombs. Traditional search radars appear to struggle against the TB2 because of its slow speed and size, which give it a low radar cross section. One radar that was destroyed on 7 May appeared to be actively scanning just prior to supposedly being hit, although Russian units reportedly turn off their own radars to reduce the radar being detected and targeted. The drone can also be deployed within minutes and launched from a normal road.

On 17 March 2022, a Bayraktar TB2 was shot down over Kyiv; Russia published images of the drone wreckage. A second TB2 drone was shot down on 29 March 2022, in eastern Ukraine. On 2 April a third TB-2 drone was shot down.

On 12 April 2022, one Bayraktar TB2 was claimed to have been shot down by Russian frigate Admiral Essen off the coast of Crimea.

On 13 April 2022, Ukrainian sources claimed at least two R-360 Neptune missiles were responsible for the sinking of the Russian cruiser Moskva – causing an explosion on one of the ship's exposed deckside missile tubes. Drones, likely TB2s, were alleged to have helped decoy the cruiser's defences.

On 26 and 27 April, three additional TB2 drones were destroyed, two in Kursk Oblast and the third in Belgorod Oblast, Russia, by a Pantsir-S1.

On 1 May, a TB2 drone with registration S51T was shot down in Kursk region, Russia. TB2 losses amounted to seven units confirmed visually.

On 2 May, Bayraktar drones operated by Ukraine attacked and destroyed two Russian Raptor-class patrol boats near Snake Island.

On 7 May, a TB2 drone attacked and destroyed a Russian Mil Mi-8 transport helicopter as it was unloading passengers on Snake Island. In the same deployment, a TB2 drone destroyed a Tor missile launcher on the island, while a second launcher was destroyed as it was being unloaded from a landing craft. This cleared the way for a bombing run by a Ukrainian Air Force Sukhoi Su-27 'Flanker' aircraft against buildings on the island.

On 23 May 2022, the remains of a Ukrainian Bayraktar TB2, tail number 75, were found in Romanian territorial waters by Romanian authorities. The drone was likely shot down during the Snake Island attacks of 7 May.

On 28 May 2022 Lithuanian citizens fundraised $3.2 million, out of the $5.37 million unit cost, to buy a single Bayraktar TB2 drone for Ukraine. On 2 June, Baykar said: "The people of Lithuania have honorably raised funds to buy a Bayraktar TB2 for Ukraine. Upon learning this, Baykar will give a Bayraktar TB2 to Lithuania free of charge and asks those funds go to Ukraine for humanitarian aid."

From the beginning of the invasion to late June, Ukraine received over 50 TB2s. On 28 June, Defence Minister Reznikov announced that Baykar would be devoting all of its capacities to meet the needs of the Ukrainian armed forces, fulfilling its requirement for "dozens more" of the aircraft.

In July 2022, Haluk Bayraktar, CEO of Baykar, stated in an interview that his company would never supply Russia with its drones as he supports Ukraine's sovereignty and independence.

==== Further use and vulnerability ====
Although at the start of the invasion Ukrainian drones, including the TB2, were able to be used to harass Russian forces, by summer 2022 they had become less effective in this role. The disorganized Russians were initially slow to set up proper air defenses; but once they did, Ukrainian UAVs were downed with increasing frequency. In addition to being shot down, electronic warfare is used to jam and disrupt communication links. This may have caused the Ukrainians to scale back TB2 use. On 25 July, a military expert told the BBC that the slow speed and medium altitudes of Bayraktar drones made them easy targets for Russian air defenses, and that many were shot down.

In late July 2022, a TB2 with tail number U139 was reported shot down in Belgorod Oblast, Russia. On 2 August another drone, with call sign 409, was shot down in Ukraine. On 2 September, the remains of a Ukrainian TB2 drone were discovered in Kherson.

By July 2022, Bayraktar TB2 losses reached 14 units confirmed visually by that time.

On 15 January 2023 a Bayraktar TB2 was downed by Russian Electronic Warfare systems Downed using EW systems.

On 22 January 2023, the remains of a destroyed Bayraktar TB2 drone were found in Odesa.

The commander of the Russian Air Defense Force, Lieutenant General Andrey Demin, claimed in April 2023 that Russia had shot down "more than 100" Bayraktar drones since the war began.

On 23 February 2023, a Bayraktar TB2 crashed in Kharkiv oblast due to friendly fire.

On 5 May 2023, the Ukrainian air force said it downed one of its own TB2 drones over Kyiv, after they lost control of it due to a "likely" technical malfunction. No casualties were reported from the incident.

On 12 May, another Bayraktar TB2 drone was shot down by Russian forces near Marinka.

By June 2023, the role of the remaining TB2 drones had changed from attack to reconnaissance, staying out of the range of Russian air defenses and using their more advanced optics and sensors to guide other drones.

On 17 July 2023, another TB2 drone, T 263 was shot down by Russian forces in Kherson Oblast.

On 3 September 2023, Ukraine released video of a KS-701 patrol boat being destroyed by a TB2 drone. This was the first time the drone had been confirmed as being used offensively in several months. Recently, it had been used for reconnaissance, such as correcting artillery fire, due to Russian air defences. It is believed that the degrading of Russian air defenses due to Ukrainian attacks have allowed TB2 drones to be used in air strikes again. However, Colonel Volodymyr Valiukh, a commander in Ukrainian Main Intelligence Directorate, reported in late October 2023 that TB2 drones are now rarely used and only for short-time reconnaissance missions because of more sophisticated Russian air defense and electronic warfare systems. He specifically said: "For the TB2, I don't want to use the word useless, but it is hard to find situations where to use them".

On 3 September 2025, a Russian high speed boat was destroyed by Ukrainian TB2, killing 7 and injuring 4 on board. Ukraine systematically destroying Russian air defences in Crimea allowed TB2 drones to fly again over the Black Sea and Ukraine released footage of a TB2 destroying Russian USVs in June 2026.

According to the Oryx Blog, as of 25 February 2025, 26 Bayraktar TB2s were destroyed, either on the ground or having been shot down by Russian forces.

=== Ethiopia ===
Ethiopian forces have reportedly been using the TB2 against the TPLF in the Tigray War. Satellite images have shown TB2 drones in Harar Meda airbase, and debris of MAM-L guided munition have been found in Tigray. On 7 January 2022, a drone strike killed nearly 60 civilians and injured dozens more in a camp of internally displaced people in Dedebit in Tigray; the missile used was a MAM-L exclusively used with the TB2 drone.

=== African insurgencies ===
Some parts of Africa face attacks by highly mobile bands of Islamist militants, who move through scrubby terrain by motorbike to attack isolated military and civilian targets. These attacks had largely been in the Sahel, but by 2019 they had been spreading. Drones provide countries with the aerial surveillance capacity to seek and potentially attack insurgents. Buying from Turkey reduces the dependence of Niger and Togo on former-colonial-power France.

=== 2025 India-Pakistan conflict ===
The Indian armed forces claimed, on the nights of 8 and 9 May during Operation Sindoor, the Indian Akashteer system directed Indian missile batteries to shoot down several Pakistani drones, including the Bayraktar TB2s. India claimed that the TB-2s failed to strike their targets. According to reports made by the Indian media, most drones were shot down as soon as they crossed into Indian airspace while several Bayraktar TB2s were downed while still over Pakistan.. There was no independent corroboration of these claims, or of Pakistan using the Bayraktar TB2 during the conflict.

== Variants ==
=== Bayraktar TB2S ===
In October 2020, Baykar CTO Selçuk Bayraktar showed the new, improved version of TB2, named TB2S. In Bayraktar's Twitter post, the TB2S has a protrusion on its body and an antenna on its nose for satellite communication (SATCOM). In the basic model, TB2, communication between the aircraft and the control station was via ground-based antennas. Communication via the TÜRKSAT satellite provides a much greater control range than the 150–300 kilometres (93–186 mi) range of the basic model. The satellite communication will also make the TB2S more resistant to the jamming of communications by the enemy. The SATCOM-integrated TB2S made its maiden flight on 4 December 2020.

=== Bayraktar TB2T-AI ===
In February 2025, the CTO of Baykar, Selçuk Bayraktar, unveiled the new version on his official X page, followed by a video of the first flight of the updated drone. According to the post, the new variant has the following specifications:

- Turbo engine
- New aerodynamic design (New added winglets and horizontal stabilisers to the inverted V-tail of TB2)
- Three advanced AI computers
- Speed: 160 kts (~300 km/h)
- Increased MTOW and payload capacity
- Max. altitude: 30,000 feet
- 30,000 feet climb: 25 min

== Operators ==
Current operators Future operators

As of September 2023, the Bayraktar TB2 has been exported to 31 countries. Some of these countries are unknown. The known countries are as follows:

- Turkey [2014]
  - Turkish Land Forces – >200 TB2s operational.
  - Turkish Naval Forces – 10 TB2s.
  - Gendarmerie General Command – 18 TB2s, used by Elazig Gendarmerie UAV command.
  - Coast Guard Command – 6 TB2s.
  - General Directorate of Security (Police) – Under the aviation department, 6 TB2s entered the inventory in 2019, another 3 TB2s entered in 2020, and 3 more in 2022.
  - Turkish National Intelligence Organization – 86 TB2s in use in Turkish security units, and 6 each in Qatar and Ukraine.
- Qatar [2019]
  - Reconnaissance and Surveillance Center – 6 operational.
- Libya [2019]
  - Libyan Air Force
- Ukraine [2019]
  - Ukrainian Air Force – 6 operational and 48 more have been ordered (as of 2020). (It is unknown how many systems are still in operation. Russia claimed in 2023 that more than 100 were shot down.)
    - 383rd UAV Brigade
  - Ukrainian Navy – 6 have been ordered, the first drone arrived in July 2021. Four more were intended to be purchased by the end of 2022. (It is unknown how many systems are still in operation.)
    - 10th Naval Aviation Brigade
- Azerbaijan [2020]
  - Azerbaijani Air Force had confirmed its use.
- Turkmenistan [2021]
  - Turkmen Air Force
- Morocco [2021]
  - Moroccan Air Force – 19 drones have been ordered.
- Ethiopia [2021]
  - Ethiopian Air Force – 4 ordered in August 2021, delivered in November 2021.
- Kyrgyzstan [2021]
  - State Border Guard Service – Ordered 3 units. Deliveries started.
- Somalia [2021]
  - Somali Air Force
- Pakistan [2022]
  - Pakistan Army and Pakistan Air Force – 24 in service (Janes assessment). Evaluated in mid 2021, with operations starting in early 2022.
- Djibouti [2022]
  - Djibouti Air Force
- Burkina Faso [2022]
  - Burkina Faso Air Force
- Rwanda [2022]
  - Air Force
- Togo [2022]
  - Air Force
- Tunisia [2022]
  - Tunisian Air Force
- Niger [2022]
  - Niger Air Force – 6 units delivered as of May 2022.
- Nigeria [2022]
  - Nigerian Air Force - Unknown number in service, 43 on order
- Poland [2022]
  - Polish Air Force – 24 drones were ordered in 2021, making Poland the first NATO and EU country to buy the drones. All drones were delivered in May 2024.
- Mali [2022]
  - Malian Air Force – at least three delivered in 2022, three more delivered in 2023.
- United Arab Emirates [2022]
  - United Arab Emirates Air Force – In September 2022, Reuters reported that Baykar has delivered 20 armed Bayraktar drones to the United Arab Emirates and could sell more in the future. Later in 2022, Middle East Eye reported that the UAE is negotiating to buy 120 TB2 drones from Baykar—along with a large package of ammunition, training, and control centers—in a deal worth up to 2 billion dollars. In March 2023, one TB2 drone was pictured next to UAE troops in Desert Tiger Exercise/6 military drills in Malaysia.
- Iraq [2022]
  - Iraqi Armed Forces – In an Iraqi TV broadcast, the Iraqi defense minister announced that Iraq will soon acquire TB2 drones and T129 ATAK helicopters. 8 drones have been ordered.
- Japan [2023]
  - Japan Self-Defense Forces – Purchased in the 2023 defense budget. Plans are in place for test operations by the Ground Self-Defense Force.
- Bangladesh [2023]
  - Bangladesh Army – Bangladesh purchased 6 TB2s in 2023 with a plan to purchase 6 additional units in the future. The TB2 drones will operate from army hangars at Chittagong/M.A. Hannan International, also known as Zahurul-Haque Air Base.
- Kosovo [2023]
  - Kosovo Security Force – In May 2023, it was announced that Kosovo security forces received five TB2s almost seven months after the initial agreement was signed with Baykar.
- Romania [2023]
  - Romanian Land Forces – In April 2023, the Romanian Ministry of National Defence purchased 3 Bayraktar TB2 systems consisting of 6 drones each (18 in total) for a total cost of $321 million. The purchased drones serve with the Land Forces and are based at the former 93rd Air Base. The first Romanian Bayraktar drone was presented at the military parade during Great Union Day on 1 December 2023.
- Albania [2024]
  - Albanian Armed Forces – In December 2022, Baykar's CEO Haluk Bayraktar signed a contract with the Albanian prime minister, Edi Rama, to deliver three Bayraktar TB2s to the armed forces of Albania in, with options to expand the fleet in future. In March 2024, TB2 drones arrived to Albania and were placed at the Kuçovë Air Base.
- Maldives [2024]
  - Maldives National Defence Force – 6 Bayraktar TB2s.
- Kenya [2024]
  - Kenyan Armed Forces – 6 Bayraktar. TB2s were spotted in a military hangar in Kenya, displaying the Kenyan flag.The delivery follows a training program for Kenyan operators at the Baykar Flight Training Center in Keşan, Turkey.
- Kuwait [2025]
  - Kuwaiti Armed Forces – The first Kuwaiti TB2 was unveiled in July 2025 during a ceremony attended by Minister of Defense Sheikh Abdullah Al-Ali Al-Sabah and top army generals.
- Bosnia [2025]
  - Bosnian armed forces - Bosnia and Herzegovina received its first Bayraktar TB2 drones in June 2025, when Turkey donated two units along with control stations.
- Croatia [2025]
  - Croatian Air Force – On 21 November 2024, Croatia signed a €67 million agreement with Turkish drone manufacturer Baykar Makina to acquire six Bayraktar TB2s. Entire system was put into operational use by the end of September 2025.

== Specifications (TB2) ==
5-view drawing of Bayraktar TB2 tactical drone in flight configuration. The craft is armed with a MAM-L bomb on an inner and a MAM-C bomb on an outer stb. hardpoint.

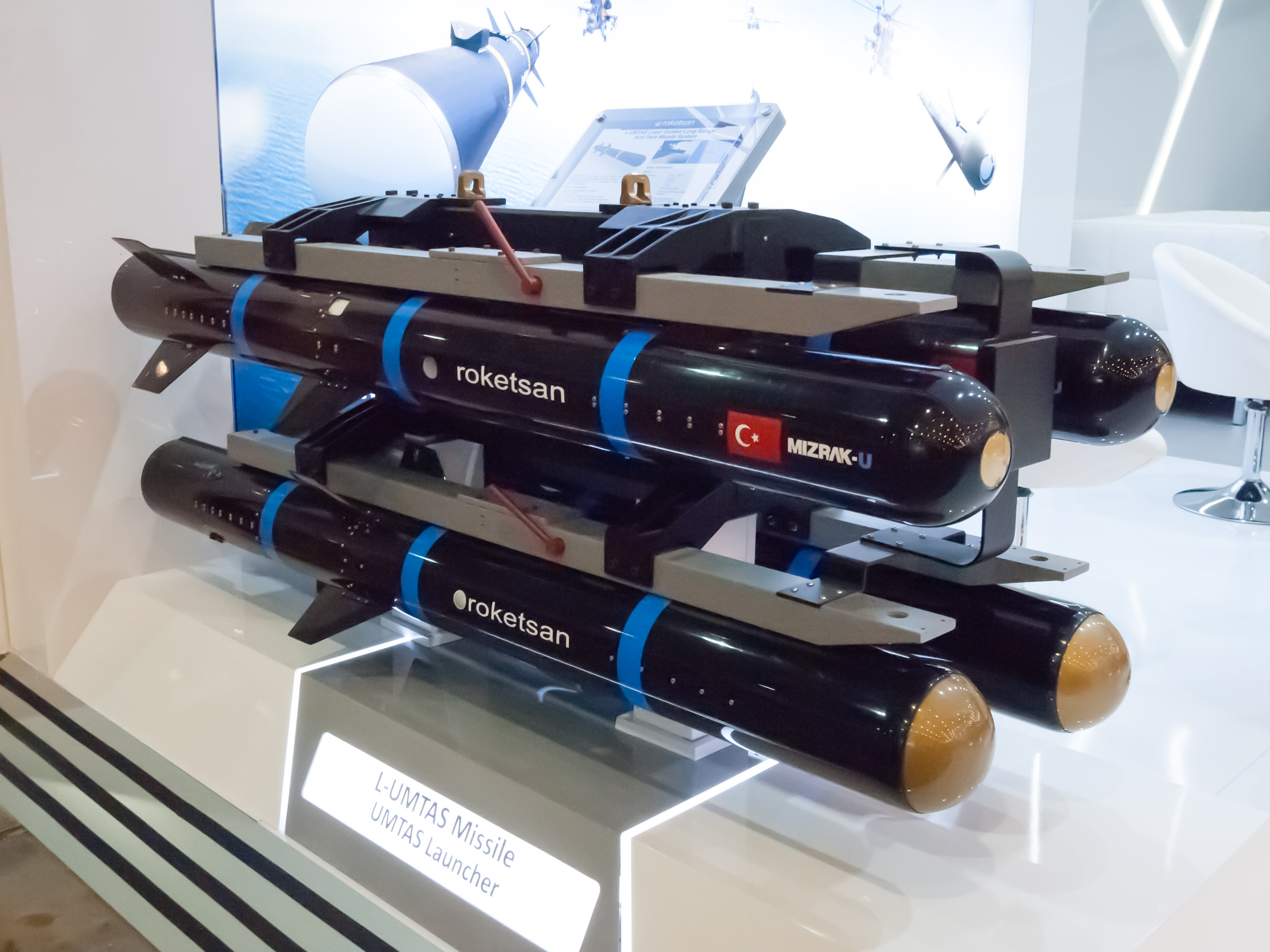
UMTAS missile used with TB2

Specifications for the Bayraktar TB2 (not TB2S) from Baykar Defence.

=== General characteristics ===
- Crew: 0 on board, 3 per ground control station
- Length: 6.5 m (21 ft 4 in)
- Wing span: 12 m (39 ft 4 in)
- Max. take-off mass: 700 kg (1,540 lb)
- Payload: 150 kg (331 lb)
- Powerplant: 1 × 100 hp (75 kW) internal combustion engine with injection
  - Baykar TM100 (option 1)
  - Rotax 912-iS (option 2)
- Propeller: 2-bladed variable-pitch
- Fuel capacity: 300 litres (79 US gal)
- Fuel type: gasoline (petrol)

=== Performance ===
- Maximum speed: 120 knots (222 km/h)
- Cruise speed: 70 knots (130 km/h)
- Range:
- Communication range: line-of-sight propagation, < 300 kilometres (186 mi)
- Service ceiling: 25,000 ft (7,620 m)
- Operational altitude: 18,000 ft (5,486 m)
- Endurance: >20 hours

=== Armaments ===
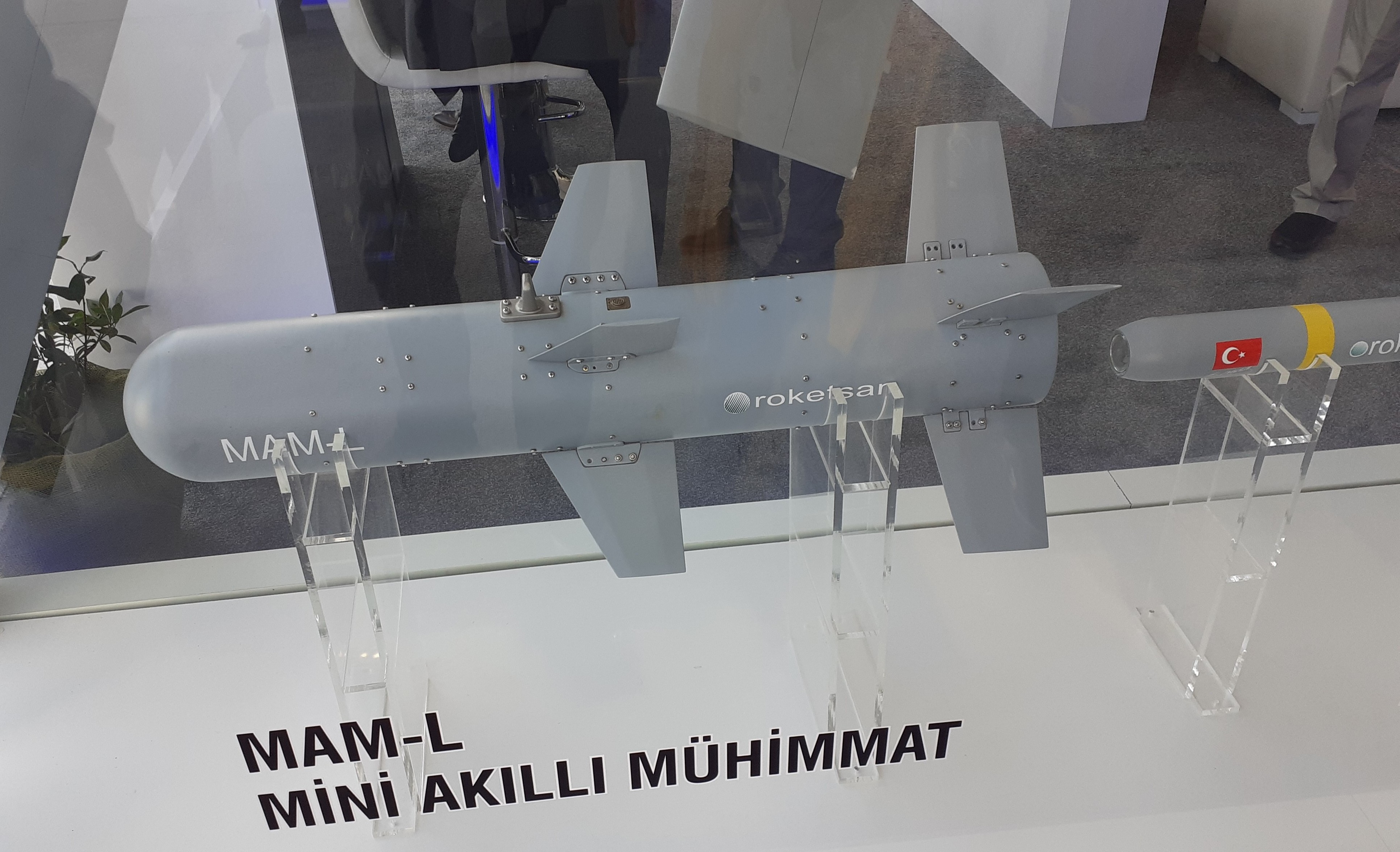
The Smart Micro Munition (MAM-L) and behind it MAM-C high explosive variant

- Hardpoints: four hardpoints with provisions to carry combinations of:
  - MAM: MAM-C and MAM-L laser-guided smart bombs
  - TUBITAK-SAGE's KAYI-30 laser-guided miniature bomb. A free fall guided ammunition with a 15 km range and a CEP of <3m.
  - TUBITAK-SAGE BOZOK laser guided munition
  - L-UMTAS (Long Range Anti tank Missile System)
  - Roketsan Cirit (70 mm Missile System)
  - Baykar Kemankeş 1 Mini Intelligent Cruise Missile
  - TUBITAK-SAGE TOGAN mono, dual or quad rack of GPS/INS guided 81 mm mortars
  - Advanced Precision Kill Weapon System – 70mm laser-guided rocket (proposed)

=== Avionics ===
- Interchangeable Electro-optical reconnaissance, surveillance and targeting system or Multi Mode AESA Radar:
  - Aselsan ASELFLIR 500 EO/IR/LD imaging and targeting sensor (Option 1)
  - Hensoldt ARGOS-II EO/IR/LD imaging and targeting sensor (Option 2)
  - Wescam MX-15D EO/IR/LD imaging and targeting sensor (Option 3)
  - Aselsan CATS EO/IR/LD imaging and targeting sensor (Option 4, succeeded by ASELFLIR 500)
  - Leonardo Osprey 30 AESA radar (Option 5)
- Garmin GNC 255A navigation/communication transceiver
- ASELSAN’s ANTIDOT pods including:
  - ANTIDOT 2-U/S electronic support pod. This pod can detect, identify, and locate signals from enemy radars. The pod has a power consumption of 300 W, which can be satisfied by tactical UAVs and UCAVs.
  - ANTIDOT 2-U LB/MB/HB mini-EW.
  - ANTIDOT 3-U mini-EW pod against UAV data links and GNSS.

== See also ==
- List of unmanned aerial vehicles
- Measurement and signature intelligence

Related development

- Bayraktar Akıncı
- Bayraktar Kızılelma
- Bayraktar Mini UAV
- Bayraktar UAV

Aircraft of comparable role, configuration, and era

- CAIG Wing Loong
- General Atomics MQ-1 Predator
- TAI Anka
- Vestel Karayel
- Qods Mohajer-6

Related lists

- List of active Turkish military aircraft
