= Selçuk Bayraktar =

Turkish engineer and businessman

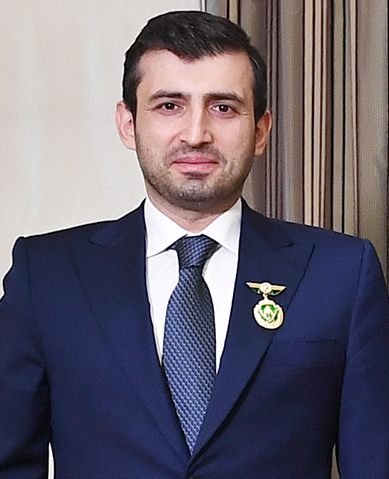
- Born: 7 October 1979 (age 46); Sarıyer, Istanbul, Turkey
- Education: Robert College; Istanbul Technical University (BS); University of Pennsylvania (MS); Massachusetts Institute of Technology (MS)
- Occupations: Pilot; electrical engineer
- Known for: Baykar
- Spouse: Sümeyye Erdoğan (m. 2016)
- Children: 2
- Father: Özdemir Bayraktar
- Relatives: Recep Tayyip Erdoğan (father-in-law); Emine Erdoğan (mother-in-law); Haluk Bayraktar (brother)
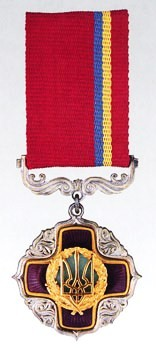
- Awards: Karabakh Order Order of Merit (Ukraine)

Academic background
- Thesis: Aggressive landing maneuvers for unmanned aerial vehicles (2006)

Signature
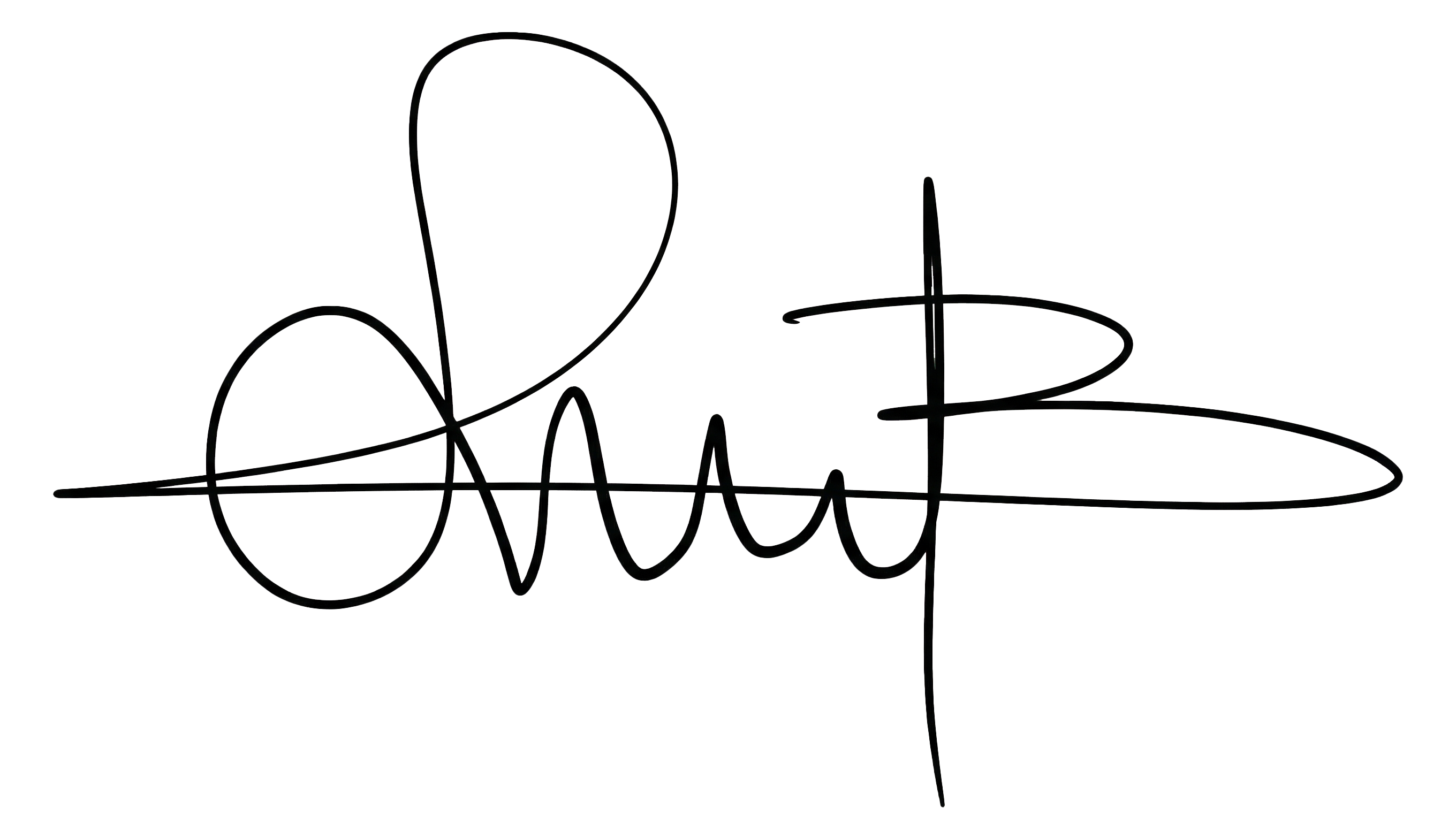

Selçuk Bayraktar (born 7 October 1979) is a Turkish pilot, engineer and businessman. He is the chairman of the board and the chief technology officer of the Turkish technology company Baykar. He is also known as the designer of Turkey's first indigenous unmanned combat aerial vehicle Bayraktar TB2 and first unmanned fighter jet Bayraktar Kızılelma. Bayraktar is also the founding chairman of the Turkish Technology Team Foundation and KÜME (Culture and Heritage) Foundation.

== Early life and education ==
Originally from Trabzon, Bayraktar was born in 1979 in the Sarıyer district of Istanbul, the second child of Özdemir Bayraktar and Canan Bayraktar. His father Özdemir (1948–2021) established the Turkish aerospace firm Baykar in 1984. Selçuk began his education in Sarıyer Primary School, thereafter enrolling in Robert College from which he graduated in 1997. In that year, he began higher education in the Department of Electronics and Communication Engineering at Istanbul Technical University. During his undergraduate education, he received a scholarship from the GRASP Laboratory at University of Pennsylvania, where he received a master's degree in 2004. His master's degree research involved a successful demonstration of air–ground coordination of UAVs in formation flight alongside territorial robot teams. This work attracted attention and he was offered a further scholarship by the Massachusetts Institute of Technology. Pursuing his studies under the supervision of George Pappas and Eric Feron, Bayraktar earned his second master's degree with his research in autonomous, aggressive maneuvering of unmanned helicopter systems.

== Career ==
Following his education, he returned to Turkey in 2007 and become the chief technology officer of Baykar. Under his leadership, Baykar has developed Bayraktar UAVs, Turkey's first indigenous UAV project, including the Bayraktar Mini UAV, Bayraktar TB2, Bayraktar VTOL and Bayraktar Akıncı. These vehicles were used by Turkish security forces in counterterrorism operations against PKK and participated in conflicts such as the Syrian Civil War, the Second Libyan Civil War, the Second Nagorno-Karabakh War and the 2022 Russian Invasion of Ukraine. As a result of the contributions of Bayraktar TB2s to repatriating Nagorno-Karabakh from Armenia in 2021, Azerbaijan’s President Ilham Aliyev has awarded Mr. Bayraktar with the Karabakh Order. The following year, Mr. Bayraktar was awarded the Ukrainian Order of Merit by President Volodymyr Zelenskyy. The order was presented by the Ukrainian Head of Presidential Administration Andrii Yermak on 2 October 2022.

In March 2021, Bayraktar announced a new UAV model Bayraktar TB3, which is a MALE class STOL-designed aircraft, and an addendum to the company designated TB series UAV's after Bayraktar TB2. The new aircraft is planned to be deployed on Turkey's first amphibious assault ship TCG Anadolu. In April 2021, Bayraktar announced their target to conduct the maiden flight of Turkey's first domestically-made unmanned fighter jet in 2023. However, Bayraktar Kızılelma completed its first flight ahead of the expected date, on 14 December 2022. One other significant project that Bayraktar leads is Turkey's first flying car (manned eVTOL) project Cezeri. Cezeri demonstrated its first flight in September 2020 with hovering autonomously 10 meters above ground. The vehicle and the flight was widely covered in global media. Recently Bayraktar announced a new venture on space technologies with making public their ongoing initiatives on orbital transfer vehicles and satellite technologies.

== Politics ==
Bayraktar is seen as possible successor as leader of the AK Party and president Erdoğan.

== Philanthropy ==
Bayraktar supports the National Technology Initiative pursued by Turkey that aims to establish a local and indigenous high-technology environment. Therefore, in addition to his professional work, he holds the founding chairmanship of the Turkish Technology Team Foundation. The foundation aims to raise public awareness and educate talented youth to promote the necessary ecosystem for the national development of high technology in Turkey. It holds maker lab workshops at cities around the country which Bayraktar frequently attends. He is also chairman of the Teknofest annual aerospace and technology festival. It holds pre-funded technology competitions and exhibits technology enterprises that have been brought from around the world. With hosting more than 1.7 million visitors in 2019, the organization has become the most visited aerospace and technology festival. Bayraktar played a crucial role during the COVID-19 pandemic with leading major tech companies of Turkey to design and manufacture the nation's first ICU-type medical ventilation machine.

== Patents ==
- Automatic Landing and Takeoff System for Aircraft (Turkish Patent Institute 2015/07928)
- Electromechanical Servo Motor Controlled Actuator System and Control Method Capable of Detecting Changing Operating Conditions (Turkish Patent Institute 2015/14111)
- Triple-Redundant Flight Control System (Turkish Patent Institute Ref: PT2015-00693)
- EKG Device (Turkish Patent Institute Ref: PT2015-00693)

== Personal life ==
He married Sümeyye Erdoğan, daughter of Recep Tayyip Erdoğan, in 2016 and has a daughter and a son with her.

== Awards ==
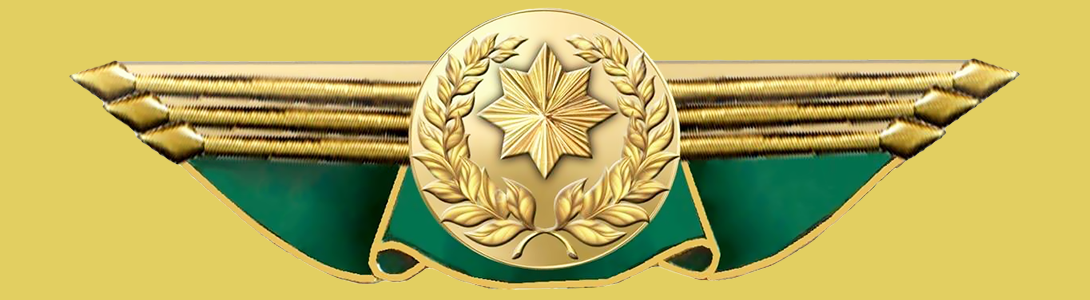
- Azerbaijan 1 April 2021: Karabakh Order
- Ukraine 2 October 2022: State Order of Merit
- Azerbaijan 4 April 2023: Medal of Military Cooperation
- Azerbaijan 2 October 2023: ASAN Service Medal
- Mali 18 October 2023: National Order of Mali
- Ukraine 28 April 2024: Order of the National Security and Defense Council of Ukraine, 1st Degree
- Kyrgyzstan 9 October 2024: Dank State Award of Kyrgyzstan
