= List of ambassadors of Turkey to Ukraine =

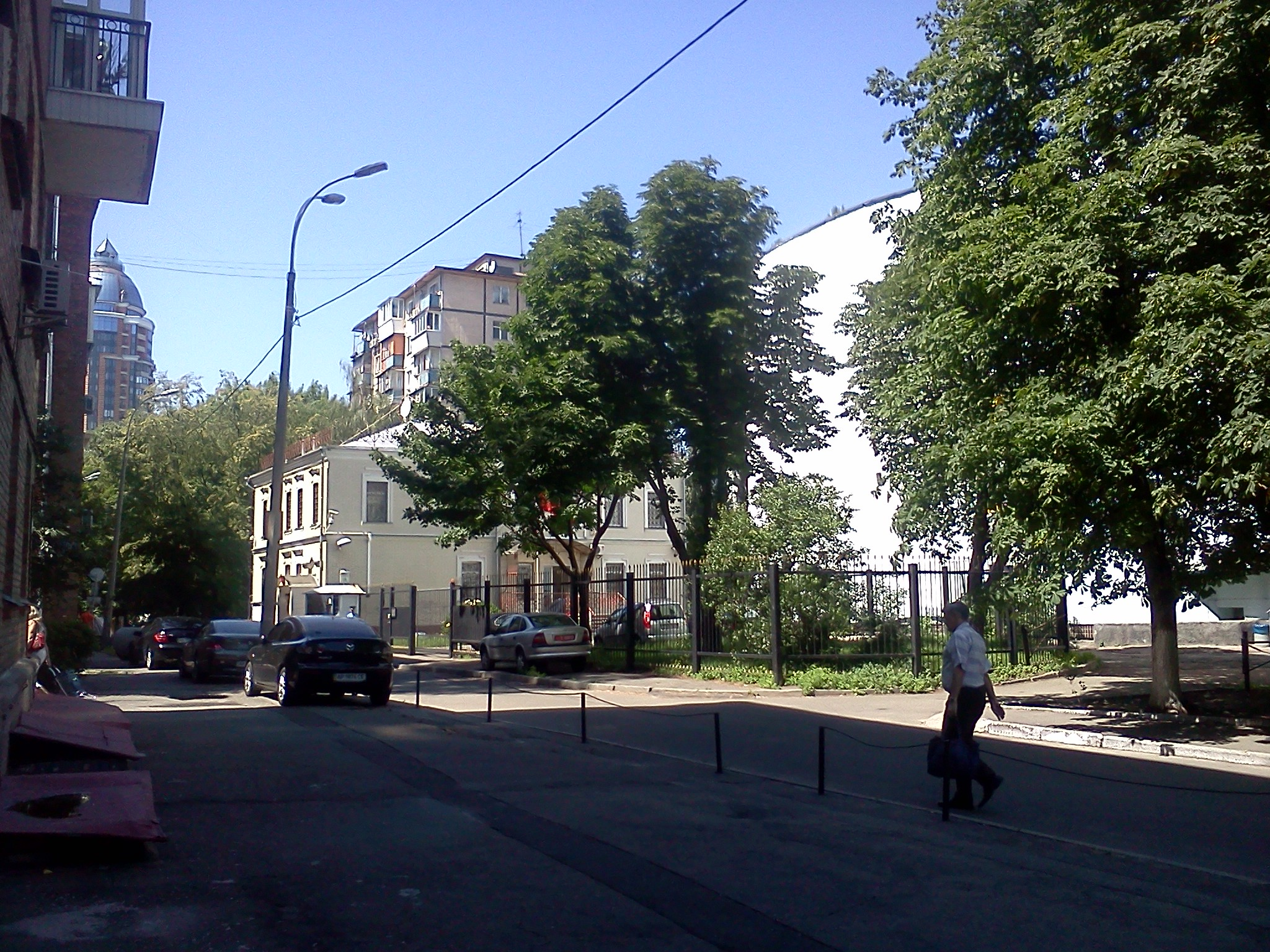
Embassy of Turkey in Kyiv

The ambassador of Turkey to Ukraine is the official representative of the president and the government of Turkey in Ukraine since the establishment of diplomatic relations between the two nations in 1992.

== List of ambassadors ==
#	Ambassador	Term start	Term end	Ref.
1	Acar Germen	15 April 1992	30 November 1997	
2	Alp Karaosmanoğlu	1 December 1997	15 November 2001	
3	A. Bilge Cankorel	1 December 2001	16 December 2005	
4	Erdoğan İşcan	23 December 2005	2 November 2009	
5	Ahmet Bülent Meriç	1 December 2009	15 November 2011	
6	Mehmet Samsar	1 December 2011	16 December 2013	
7	Yönet Can Tezel	1 February 2014	6 January 2019	
8	Yağmur Ahmet Güldere	7 January 2019	7 October 2023	
9	M. Levent Bilgen	15 October 2023	Present	

== See also ==
- Turkey–Ukraine relations
- Ministry of Foreign Affairs
- List of diplomatic missions of Turkey
