= Embassy of Georgia, Kyiv =

Embassy of Georgia in Kyiv
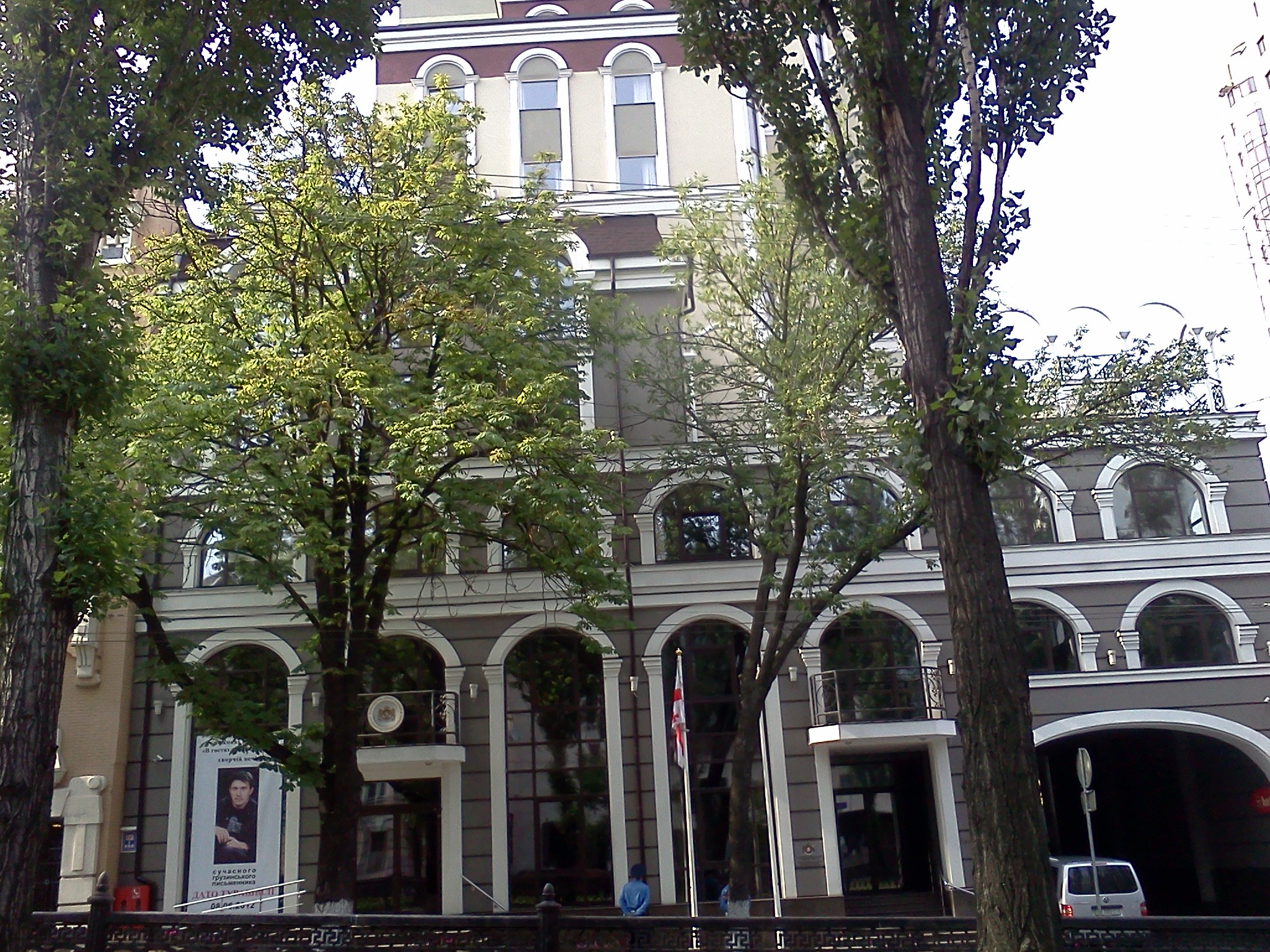
- Location: Kyiv
- Address: Arsenalna St., 18, Kyiv 01901, Ukraine
- Coordinates: 50°26′43″N 30°29′54″E
- Ambassador: Grigol Katamadze

The Embassy of Georgia in Kyiv is the diplomatic mission of Georgia in Ukraine.

== History ==
In early September 1918 in Kyiv, after talks with the government of Ukraine began operating Diplomatic Mission of Georgia, appointed ambassador Victor Tevzaya. and his deputy David Vacheishvili. The composition of the embassy were first and second secretaries, the consular, military attaché assistant economics department, press office. In the administrative and technical staff were Commandant home typists, translators, car driver, couriers, utility workers and others, only 20 people

Diplomatic relations between Georgia and Ukraine were established on 21 July 1992. April 5, 1994 began work Embassy of Ukraine in Georgia, August 19, 1994 - Embassy of Georgia in Kyiv.

== Consulate General of Georgia ==
- Consulate General of Georgia in Odesa, Leo Tolstoy str, 30, Odesa, Ukraine
- Honorary Consulate of Georgia in Yalta
- Honorary Consulate of Georgia in Zhytomyr
- Honorary Consulate of Georgia in Lviv

== Previous Ambassadors ==
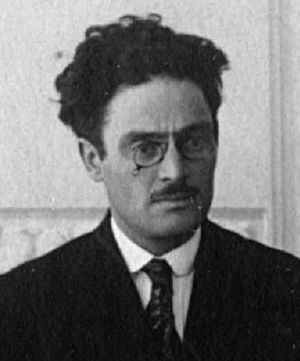
First Ambassador of Georgia to Ukraine Victor Tevzaia (1918-1919)

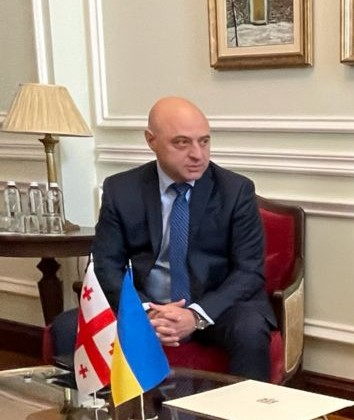
Acting Ambassador of Georgia to Ukraine Georgy Zakarashvili (from 2021)

1. Victor Tevzaia (09.1918-09.1919)
2. Valeriy Chechelashvili (05.07.1994-04.10.1998);
3. Malkhaz Chachava (16.12.1998-13.10.2000);
4. Grigol Katamadze (31.10.2000 – 2007);.
5. Merab Antadze (01.11.2007 – 2008);
6. Grigol Katamadze (01.01.2009 - 2013).
7. Mikheil Ukleba (2013 - 2017)
8. Gela Dumbadze (2017 - 2019)
9. Teimuraz Sharashenidze (2019 - 2021)
10. Georgy Zakarashvili (2021 - )

== See also ==
- Georgia–Ukraine relations
- Foreign relations of Georgia (country)
- Foreign relations of Ukraine
- Embassy of Ukraine, Tbilisi
- Diplomatic missions in Ukraine
- Diplomatic missions of Georgia (country)
