= Black Sea Grain Initiative =

2022–2023 Russia–Ukraine agreement on grain export

Initiative on the Safe Transportation of Grain and Foodstuffs from Ukrainian ports
- Grain could travel through safe corridors in the Black sea from Ukraine (yellow) to Turkey (green), where it was inspected.
- Date effective: 22 July 2022 – 17 July 2023
- Location: Dolmabahçe Palace, Istanbul, Turkey
- Signatories: Ukraine; Russia (Note: Suspended participation on 29 October, resumed participation on 2 November); Turkey; United Nations
- Subject: Export of grain and related foodstuffs and fertilizers

Full text
- Initiative on the Safe Transportation of Grain and Foodstuffs from Ukrainian Ports at Wikisource

The Black Sea Grain Initiative (or the Initiative on the Safe Transportation of Grain and Foodstuffs from Ukrainian ports (Note: Russian: Инициатива по безопасной транспортировке зерна и продовольствия из украинских портов, называемая Черноморской зерновой инициативой, Зерновой сделкой, romanized: Initsiativa po bezopasnoy transportirovke zerna i prodovol'stviya iz ukrainskikh portov, nazyvayemaya Chernomorskoy zernovoy initsiativoy, Zernovoy sdelkoy; Ukrainian: Ініціатива з безпечного транспортування зерна та харчових продуктів з українських портів, Чорноморська зернова ініціатива, «зернова угода», romanized: Initsiatyva z bezpechnoho transportuvannya zerna ta kharchovykh produktiv z ukrayinsʹkykh portiv, Chornomorsʹka zernova initsiatyva, "zernova uhoda"; Turkish: Ukrayna Limanlarından Tahıl ve Gıda Maddelerinin Güvenli Taşınması Girişimi, Karadeniz Tahıl Girişimi) commonly called the grain deal in the media) was an agreement between Russia, Ukraine, Turkey, and the United Nations (UN). It took place during the Russian invasion of Ukraine. The February 2022 invasion led to a complete halt of maritime grain shipments from Ukraine, previously a major exporter via the Black Sea. Additionally, Russia temporarily halted its grain exports, further exacerbating the situation. This resulted in a rise in world food prices, the threat of famine in lower-income countries, and accusations that Russia was weaponizing food supplies. To address the issue, discussions began in April, hosted by Turkey (which controls the maritime routes from the Black Sea) and supported by the UN. The resulting agreement was signed in Istanbul on 22 July, valid for a period of 120 days. The July agreement created procedures to safely export grain from certain ports to attempt to address a worldwide food crisis. A joint coordination and inspection center was set up in Turkey, with the UN serving as secretariat.

The original agreement was set to expire on 19 November 2022. Russia suspended its participation in the agreement for several days due to a drone attack on Russian naval ships elsewhere in the Black Sea, but rejoined following mediation. On 17 November 2022, the UN and Ukraine announced that the agreement had been extended for a further 120 days. In March 2023, Turkey and the UN announced that they had secured a second extension for at least another 60 days. In May 2023, the deal was once again extended for 60 days, to expire on 18 July. By mid-July 2023, more than 1000 shipments had successfully left Ukrainian ports, carrying nearly 33 million tonnes of grain and other food products to 45 countries. In summer 2023, Russia repeatedly claimed it would withdraw from the deal in July 2023 unless its demands were met. By 17 July 2023, no new agreement to renew the deal had been reached, and the extended original agreement expired.

== Background ==
In 2022, an estimated 47 million people were experiencing severe hunger as a result of the world's rising food costs partly due to the impact of the 2022 Russian invasion of Ukraine. Developing countries in Africa, Asia, and Latin America were impacted the most by the conflict due to their reliance on imported grain and fuel.

According to the UN Food and Agriculture Organization, Ukraine is a leading grain exporters, providing more than 45 million tonnes annually to the global market. Some 20 million tonnes of grain had been held up in the Ukrainian port city of Odesa, according to the BBC. Almost all of Ukraine's wheat, corn, and sunflower oil were exported through its Black Sea ports prior to the war. Before the agreement, some ports' infrastructure had been damaged, some were under Russian control and others were blocked by mines. Initially, the Ukrainian government was reluctant to de-mine the sea due to the scale of the task and the possibility of leaving the ports open to attack.

In March 2022, the Centre for Humanitarian Dialogue (HD) proposed to the United Nations Secretary-General the possibility of an agreement between Russia and Ukraine to allow grain to move from Ukraine, through the Russian Black Sea blockade, to world markets. In return, Russia would be offered sanctions relief for its own agricultural exports.

== Agreement ==
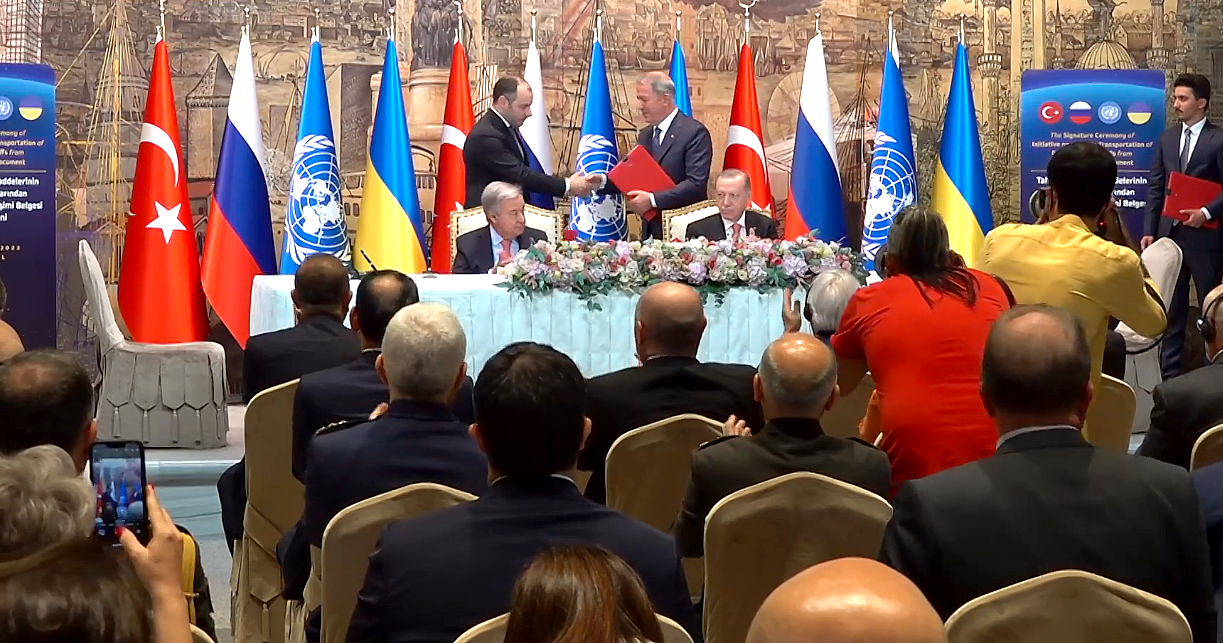
The signing ceremony in Istanbul on 22 July 2022

On 22 July 2022, the signing ceremony took place at Dolmabahçe Palace in Istanbul, Turkey. The ceremony marked the first major deal between the warring sides since the beginning of the Russian invasion in February. However, it was not a direct agreement between Russia and Ukraine. Instead, Ukraine signed an agreement with Turkey and the UN, and Russia signed a separate "mirror" agreement with Turkey and the UN.

The signed documents entailed the safe navigation for the export of grain and related foodstuffs and fertilizers. The ships would traverse the Black Sea in specially created corridors that would be demined, with Turkey inspecting all merchant vessels. Another agreement was concurrently made for the UN to facilitate unimpeded exports of Russian food, fertilizer, and raw materials.

The grain deal initiative ran from July 2022 to July 2023 before Russia backed out of the deal.

=== Joint Coordination Centre ===
As part of the agreement, a Joint Coordination Centre (JCC) was created under the auspices of the UN in Istanbul on 27 July. The JCC was tasked with registering and monitoring the departure of commercial ships via satellite, internet, and other communication means. Its primary responsibility was to check for the presence of unauthorized cargo and personnel on board of the vessels. The JCC was located on the campus of the National Defense University, about seven kilometers north of the center of Istanbul. The center was headed by a Turkish admiral. A total of 20 delegates were employed (five representatives each from the four involved parties). Ukrainians and Russians worked separately from each other and contact between them would happen only in emergency situations if deemed necessary. The JCC agreed and issued Procedures for Merchant Vessels. The Procedures specified the coordinates of the corridor and inspection zones and established a buffer security zone 10 nautical miles in radius, moving with a transiting vessel, entry to the zone being prohibited to military ships, aircraft, or UAVs.

The JCC was disbanded with the expiration of the initiative on 17 July 2023.

== July 2022 to July 2023 ==
Following the signing of the deal, wheat prices dropped to pre-war levels. On 23 July 2022, less than a day after signing a grain export deal, it was reported that Russia launched Kalibr missiles at the Odesa sea trade port. Russian officials told Turkey that Russia had "nothing to do" with the missile strike. The next day, Igor Konashenkov, a spokesman of the Russian Ministry of Defence, confirmed the strike, claiming that it destroyed a Ukrainian warship and a warehouse of Harpoon anti-ship missiles. Following the attack, insurers were more reluctant to insure trading ships sailing to Ukraine. The United Kingdom said it would help achieve insurance for the companies involved. On 1 August 2022, the first ship left a Ukrainian port. As of 26 August, according to Ukrainian President Volodymyr Zelenskyy, some 1 million tonnes of grain had been exported by Ukraine. According to the Ukrainian president, the stated aim is at least 3 million tonnes a month. On 4 September, Ukraine dispatched 282,500 tonnes of agricultural products to eight countries in 13 vessels, the largest daily total to that date. In mid-October, Ukraine's grain exports were running about 36 percent lower than during the previous season. In 2022, Turkey (170), Spain (100), Italy (81), China (51), and Egypt (30) received the most shipments.

As of October 2022, the widescale theft of Ukrainian grain involved both private companies and Russian state operatives. Some of the stolen grain was laundered through transfers and by mixing it with legitimate goods. Ukraine intended to export 60 million tonnes over nine months if their ports continued to function well. "Solidarity corridors" were organized on the borders of Ukraine by the European Union for passage of grain through European rail, road, and river cargo shipments to destined countries, 60% of Ukrainian grain were exported through the European "solidarity corridors" and the remaining through the Black Sea ports, unblocked according to the Istanbul agreements, till October 2022.

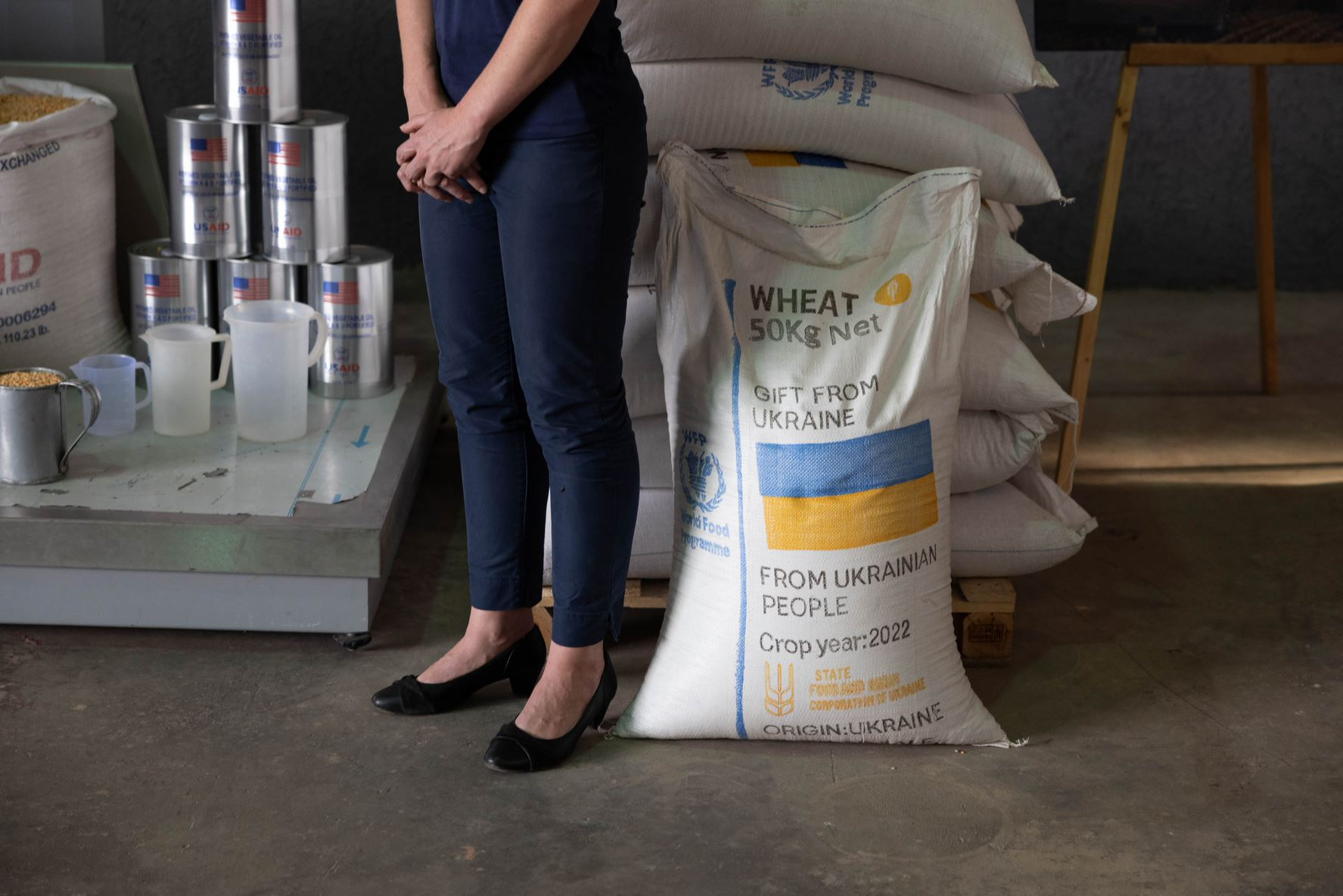
Bags of wheat from Ukraine in Addis Ababa, Ethiopia (March 2023)

By mid-July 2023, more than 1100 voyages had successfully left Ukrainian ports carrying nearly 33 million tonnes of grain and other food products to more than 40 different countries. 57% of grain exports went to developing countries. The United Nations' World Food Programme shipped more than 725,200 tons of grain to relieve hunger around the world, including to Afghanistan, Ethiopia, Kenya, Somalia, Sudan, and Yemen.

=== Controversies on voluntary Russian withdrawal ===
The agreement, initially applicable for a period of only four months, was set to expire on 19 November 2022, unless renewed. In mid-October, Russian diplomats at the UN stated that a renewed agreement must also allow for increased exports of Russian grain and fertilizers. Ukraine criticized the Russian stance and stated that it had no additional demands beyond the July terms it had previously agreed to. The UN coordinator for the agreement, Amir Mahmoud Abdulla, expressed hope that a renewal agreement could be reached as the UN continued to facilitate discussions.

In late June, Russian forces withdrew from Snake Island after sustained attacks by Ukraine. Russia described the retreat as "a gesture of goodwill". Russian Defence Ministry spokesperson Igor Konashenkov said at a briefing, "the move was a symbolic step to disprove statements by Ukraine and its allies that Moscow is economically blockading its pro-Western neighbor".

On 29 October, Russia suspended its participation in the agreement because of a massed drone attack on the Port of Sevastopol. Russia suggested that Ukraine had misused a cargo ship to conduct the strike, but UN stated that no cargo ships were in the grain corridor on the night of the attack. A number of grain ships continued to depart from Ukrainian ports with the UN and Turkey's approval, although it was unclear whether shipments could go on indefinitely. Insurers paused the issuing of insurance for future vessel movements under the initiative. Russia resumed its participation on 2 November after Turkish and UN mediation. Russia stated that Ukraine had agreed not to use the grain export corridor to conduct military operations against Russia, while Ukraine stated that no new assurances were given as Ukraine would not make military use of the corridor.

=== Renewals ===
On 16 November 2022, Turkish president Recep Tayyip Erdoğan expressed confidence that the agreement would be renewed for up to a year. The next day, the UN and Ukraine announced that the agreement had been extended for a further 120 days, with the new deadline being 18 March 2023. By March 2023, Turkey and the UN announced they were facilitating negotiations for a second extension of the deal, with discussions having taken place. Russia had previously stated that it would have accepted a renewal of the deal only if its own exports were unblocked, which had been previously hampered due to international sanctions that had indirectly affected their agricultural industry. Later that month, Russia proposed to renew the deal for only 60 days, which Ukraine refused. However, by 18 March, it was confirmed that the deal had been extended, though neither the UN nor Turkey confirmed for how long. Despite this, Russia and Ukraine both claimed the deal had been extended, for 60 and 120 days, respectively.

On 6 April 2023, Russian foreign minister Sergei Lavrov again visited Turkey to meet his Turkish counterpart, Mevlüt Çavuşoğlu. Russia continued to claim that international sanctions were blocking Russian agricultural exports, but the actual reason was shipping companies' reluctance to move Russian products due to the war. Russian grain exports for the 2022–23 season, which ended in the summer of 2023, were at a record high due to record shipments to Saudi Arabia, which did not impose sanctions. In mid-May 2023, the deal was once again extended for 60 days, expiring on 17 July.

Russia did not renew the deal, citing five requirements in a letter to UN officials on 16 March, the main two ones not resolved being that the Ammonia pipeline from Tolyatti in Russia to the Ukrainian Port of Odesa had not been reopened and the Russian Agricultural Bank had not been reconnected to the SWIFT international payments system. The 2,500 kilometres (1,600 mi) Ammonia pipeline, which BBC News reported the deal required safe passage through, had been damaged by a blast on 5 June 2023 and had not operated since February 2022.

== Timeline March 2022 to July 2023 ==
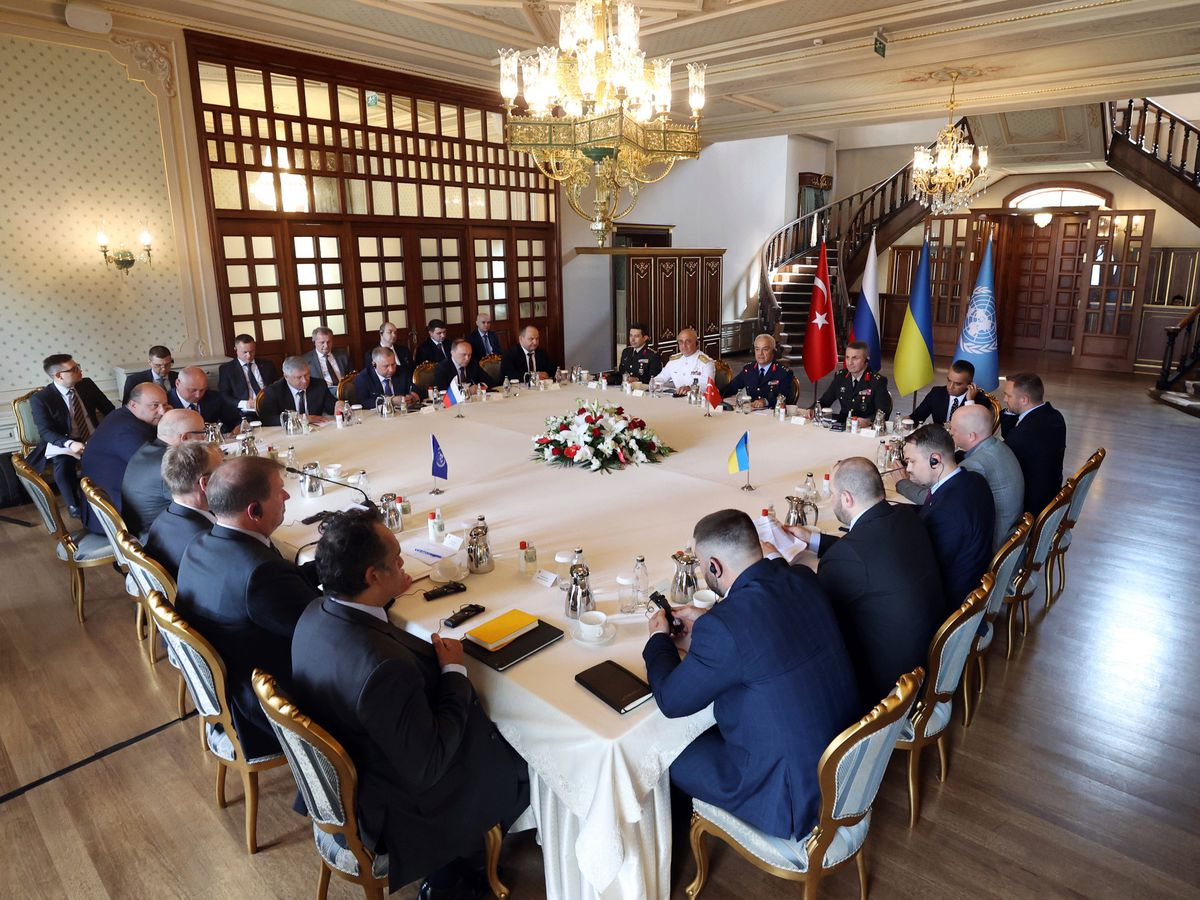
Representatives of the four parties at the negotiating table in Istanbul on 13 July 2022

- 11 March 2022: The International Maritime Organization Council called for a "blue safe maritime corridor" to allow for the safe evacuation of seafarers and ships from high-risk areas of the Sea of Azov and the Black Sea.
- Late March 2022: Centre for Humanitarian Dialogue (HD) proposes structure of possible deal to UN Secretary-General António Guterres and World Trade Organisation.
- 25 April 2022: UN Secretary-General Guterres] and Turkish President Recep Tayyip Erdoğan held a meeting to discuss the impact of the invasion on global issues, including food, energy, and finance.
- 26 April: Guterres met with Russian President Vladimir Putin and described the meeting as "very useful".
- 28 April: Guterres met with Ukrainian President Volodymyr Zelenskyy and other officials to discuss the food crisis.
- 26 May: Russia modified the route of its "blue safe maritime corridor" from Ukrainian ports through its Maritime Exclusion Zone to increase safety for merchant vessels.
- 3 June: Putin met with the President of the African Union, Macky Sall, to discuss grain deliveries from Russia and Ukraine to Africa.
- 7 June: Russian and Turkish defence ministers discussed several topics, including a potential grain export corridor from Ukraine.
- 8 July: Russian foreign minister Sergey Lavrov stated that Russia would let grain exports out if Ukraine de-mines the water around its ports.
- 11 July: Zelenskyy said he had held talks with Erdogan on the need to unblock the ports of Ukraine and resume grain exports.
- 13 July: Military delegations from Russia, Turkey, and Ukraine met with a UN delegation in Istanbul.
- 19 July: In a meeting in Iran, Putin met Erdogan to discuss the export of grain.
- 22 July: The signing ceremony for the documents was held in Istanbul in the presence of Guterres, Erdogan, Russian Defense Minister Sergei Shoigu, Ukrainian Infrastructure Minister Oleksandr Kubrakov, and Turkish Defense Minister Hulusi Akar.
- 23 July: less than a day after signing a grain export deal, Russia bombed Odesa's sea trade port.
- 25 July: Preparation is done by the Ukrainian Sea Ports Authority (USPA) for the resumption of the export of grain.
- 27 July: The Joint Coordination Centre (JCC) is officially inaugurated in Istanbul.
- 28 July: UN aid chief Martin Griffiths said that the first shipment could take place as early as Friday, but that "crucial" details were still being worked out.
- 29 July: In an unannounced appearance in Odesa, Zelenskyy said that a Ukrainian ship was ready and waiting for the signal to leave port.
- 31 July: Turkish Presidential spokesperson İbrahim Kalın announced that the first ship might depart as soon as Monday (1 August) and at the latest by Tuesday (2 August).
- 1 August: The Razoni, the first ship loaded with Ukrainian grain, was reported to have left the port of Odesa. The destination of the ship was Lebanon.
- 7 September: The total number of vessels leaving Ukraine to date in accordance with the agreement reaches 100.
- 28 October: the total number of vessels leaving Ukraine to date, in accordance with the agreement, reaches 400.
- 29 October: Russia suspends its participation.
- 2 November: Russia resumes its participation.
- 15 November: Ukraine proposes expanding the initiative to Ukraine's Mykolaiv Port and Olvia Port in the Mykolaiv Oblast.
- 19 November: The agreement is extended for a further 120 days, with the new deadline being 18 March 2023.
- 27 November: The total number of vessels leaving Ukraine to date, in accordance with the agreement, reaches 500.
- 18 March 2023: Russia and Ukraine, in talks hosted by Turkey and the UN, have agreed to extend the deal by at least another 60 days.
- 17 April 2023: Ukraine Restoration Minister allegedly said that Russia is blocking the inspection of ships.
- 17 May 2023: Russia and Ukraine, in cooperation with Turkey and the UN, agree to extend the deal another 60 days, to mid-July.
- 22 May 2023: The UN expresses concern over the lack of ships arriving at the Ukrainian port of Pivdennyi. Ukraine and the US accuse Russia of violating the deal by halting inspections for ships headed to Pivdennyi since 29 April.
- July 2023: The European Union considered a proposal for the Russian Agricultural Bank to establish a subsidiary in order to reconnect to the global financial network, including SWIFT. This was a Russian demand to safeguard the Black Sea grain deal, by easing sanctions imposed on the bank. To meet Russia's demands, the UN reported that they had created a bespoke payments mechanism, outside of SWIFT through JP Morgan, for the Russian Agricultural Bank. Russia rejected the suggestion.
- 17 July 2023: Expiration date after the extension in May 2023. As of the same date, no agreement to renew the deal was reached. Dmitry Peskov, Kremlin spokesman, said that the Black Sea Grain Initiative had been suspended. Moscow would only rejoin the deal if "concrete results" were achieved to better protect Russian agricultural exports.

== Reactions ==
=== Reactions to the signing of the initiative ===
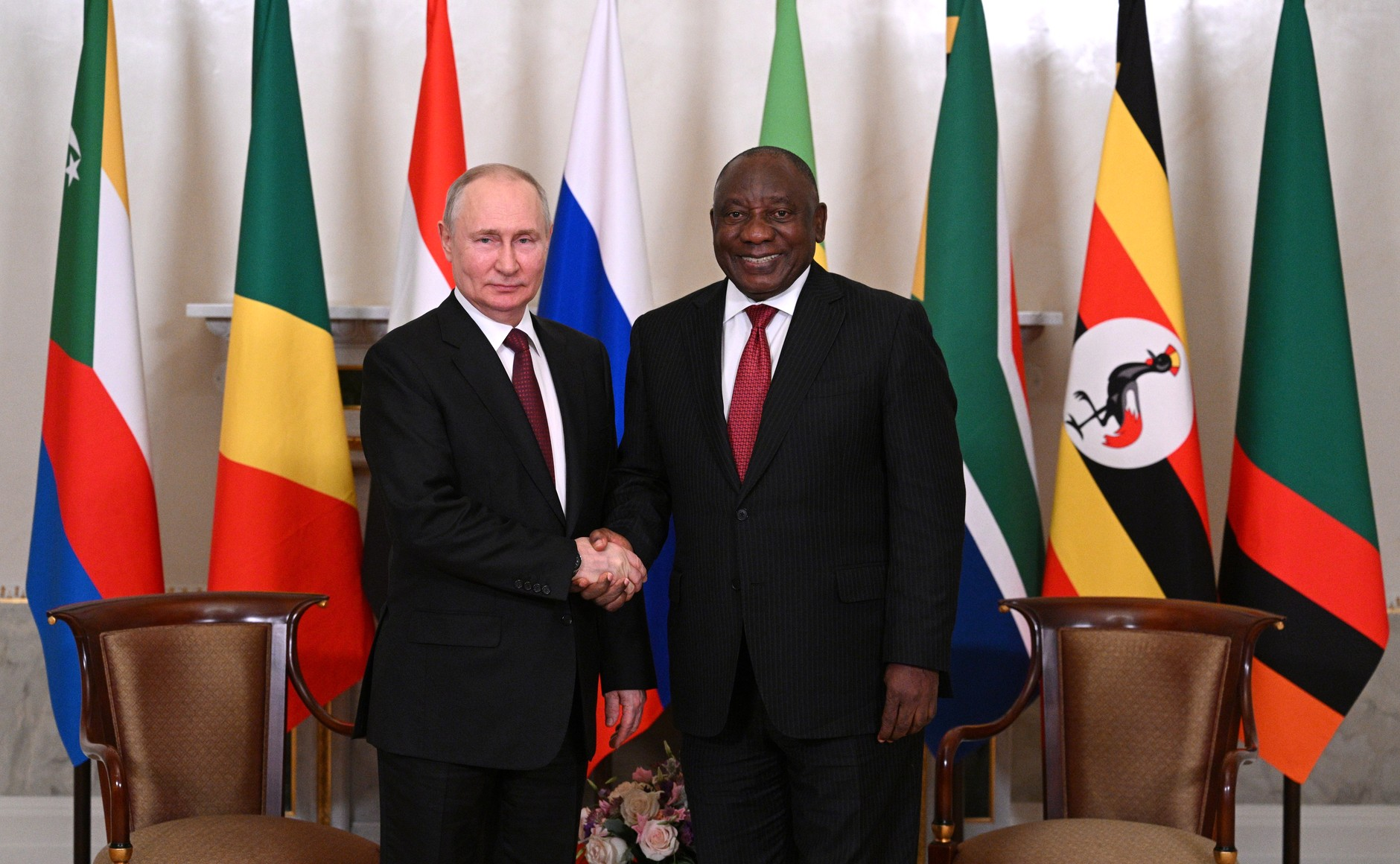
South African President Cyril Ramaphosa welcomed the agreement

The agreement was well received by the international community, which maintained concerns over its implementation. Canadian Prime Minister Justin Trudeau stated that the G7 is "working closely with partners like Turkey and others" to get the grain out of Ukraine, while having no confidence in Russia's reliability. EU foreign policy chief Josep Borrell tweeted that the agreement was a "step in the right direction" and welcomed the efforts by the UN and Turkey.

The British Foreign Secretary Liz Truss welcomed the deal and said to be "watching to ensure Russia's actions match its words". Guy Platten, the Secretary-General of the International Chamber of Shipping, called the agreement a "long-needed breakthrough for the millions of people who rely on the safe passage of grain to survive". African leaders, whose countries import food from Ukraine and Russia, welcomed the agreement, with South African President Cyril Ramaphosa saying "it has taken much too long".

At the signing ceremony, UN Secretary-General António Guterres called the agreement "a beacon of hope". It would "bring relief for developing countries on the edge of bankruptcy and the most vulnerable people on the edge of famine." He also called essential the persistence of President Erdogan through every step of this process. Russian Defense Minister Sergei Shoigu said after the signing ceremony that Russia would not take advantage of the fact that the ports would be cleared and opened.

At the 38th meeting of the Standing Committee for Economic and Commercial Cooperation (COMCEC) of the Organization of Islamic Cooperation (OIC) in Istanbul, Erdogan remarked that over 11 million tonnes of grain had been transported through the Black Sea Grain Corridor since the implementation of the agreement. He also noted that the opening of the grain corridor through the Black Sea showed that a diplomatic solution is possible in the Russian invasion of Ukraine.

=== Reactions to the expiration of the initiative ===
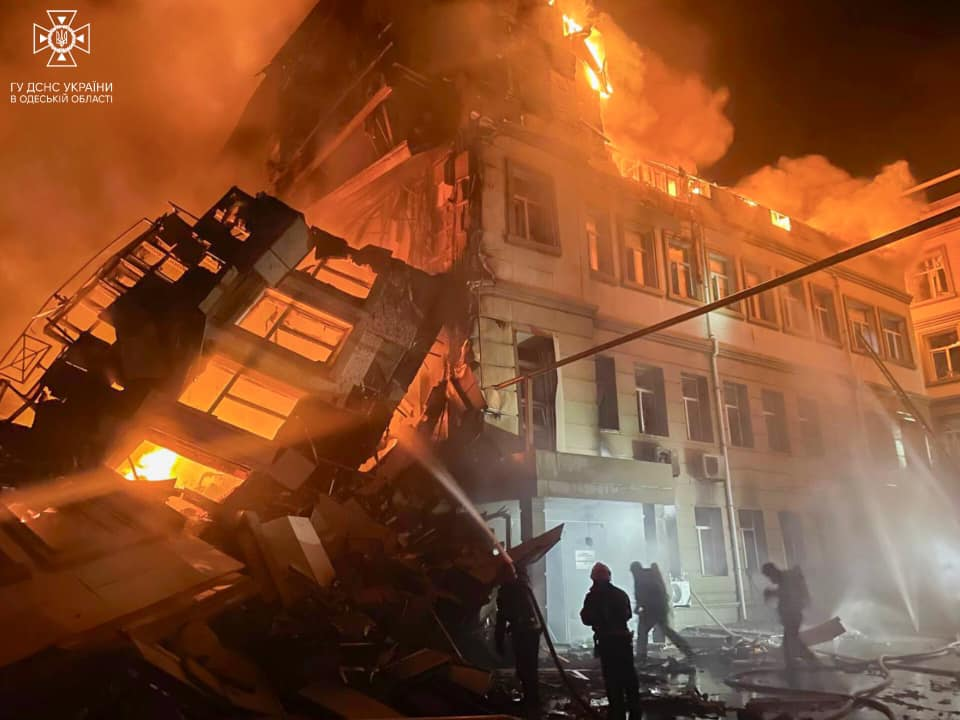
Following Putin's withdrawal from the grain deal, Russia launched a series of attacks on the Ukrainian port cities of Odesa and Mykolaiv.

In July 2023, the UN expressed disappointment over Russia discontinuing the Black Sea initiative. The UN would continue their efforts to facilitate the unimpeded access to global markets for food products and fertilizers, from both Ukraine and the Russian Federation. "There is simply too much at stake in a hungry and hurting world." There is a risk that Putin's withdrawal from the grain deal would deepen the global food crisis.

In the days following the cessation of the Black Sea initiative, Russia fired missiles and used drones against Ukrainian grain storage and loading facilities in ports that had been previously protected by the initiative. Russia also gave notice that any ships entering Ukrainian waters could be considered legitimate targets of war, irrespective of the flags that they flew. Russia's Defense Ministry said the strikes on Ukrainian port cities were in retaliation for the 2023 Crimean Bridge explosion, but Ukraine said Russia was attacking civilian infrastructure linked to grain exports.

China called for the resumption of grain and fertilizer exports from Ukraine and Russia. China had been the largest importer of grains from Ukraine.

Polish Prime Minister Mateusz Morawiecki warned that Poland was not planning to open its borders to imports of agricultural products from Ukraine, saying "We protect our agriculture, that's why we don't open borders for agricultural goods from Ukraine."

During the 2023 Russia–Africa Summit, Egyptian President Abdel Fattah el-Sisi and other African leaders urged Putin to renew the grain deal and allow Ukraine to export grain via the Black Sea route.

Pope Francis appealed to Russia to restore the initiative, saying, "This is a grave offence to God because grain is His gift to feed humanity."

== Post-initiative events ==
=== Attempts to reactivate the initiative ===
On 21 July 2023, Turkish president Erdogan reiterated that he wanted to convince his Russian counterpart Putin to renegotiate the shipment of grain products through the humanitarian corridor via the Black Sea. Russia said previously that such a deal would be a possibility but again blamed economic sanctions for hindering exports of Russian grain and fertilizer and tied a new agreement to its demands to lift certain sanctions. Erdogan is expected to meet Putin face-to-face in August to discuss details. Meanwhile, the UN has expressed grave concern over the "negative effect on global wheat and corn prices which hurts everyone, but especially vulnerable people in the global south". On 22 July, Erdogan confirmed further discussions with Zelenskyy in a personal meeting in Istanbul to renew the initiative despite heavy Russian bombardment of Odesa.

On 5 August 2023, Russian news sources indicated that there were misunderstandings with regard to the second part of the initiative certified by the UN Secretary General, and that further negotiations would have to take place through the Russian Foreign Ministry. Russia signaled that the initiative could be restarted if those disagreements were resolved. The United States claimed that Russian agricultural exports were not hindered by sanctions but Russia argued otherwise. JP Morgan, which had arranged the payments to the Russian agricultural bank, stated that the U.S. State Department would have to act on this issue. The allowance that Russian agricultural exports are ensured through payments by J.P. Morgan or SWIFT access appeared to be the key issues to fulfill Russian demands to reinstate the initiative. China, a key ally of Russia and a main importer of Ukrainian wheat, stated that a rapid return to the agreement was essential to ensure global food security.

On 4 September 2023, Putin discussed the renewal of the initiative with Erdogan during a meeting in Sochi. Erdogan expressed hope for a renewal of the grain deal and said "We, as Turkey, will reach a solution that will meet the expectations in a short time". Putin responded by saying that he was open to negotiations on this issue "as soon" as restrictions on Russian grain exports would be lifted. Russia would also ship up to one million tons of grain to Turkey at reduced prices for subsequent processing at Turkish plants and shipping to countries most in need, according to an Iranian source. Russia was also close to a deal to supply Burkina Faso, Zimbabwe, Mali, Somalia, the Central African Republic, and Eritrea with up to 50,000 tonnes of grain. A few days earlier, UN Secretary-General António Guterres communicated with Russian Foreign Minister Sergei Lavrov to implement "a set of concrete proposals" in order to revive the deal.

=== Timeline post-initiative ===
- 19 July 2023: The International Maritime Organisation circulated information from the Ukrainian government about temporary vessel traffic routes to the seaports of Chornomorsk, Odesa, and Pivdennyi in the sovereign waters of Ukraine, which lead to the territorial waters of Romania.
- 27 July: Putin promised to ship free grain to six low-income African nations during the opening ceremony of the 2023 Russia–Africa Summit in St. Petersburg.
- 30 July: Participants of the Russia-Africa summit depart from the international meeting without concrete plans to restart the initiative.
- 1 August: The first trio of ships from Greece, Israel, and Turkey anchored in a small Ukrainian grain port in Izmail, in the Danube Delta, after traversing the Black Sea under surveillance of NATO forces. The Russian navy made no attempt to interfere.
- 16 August: The Hong Kong-flagged container ship Joseph Schulte became the first ship to use the new "unilateral" corridor to leave the port of Odesa.
- 23 August: A Russian drone attack on the port of Izmail on the Danube destroyed 13,000 tons of grain destined for Egypt and Romania.
- 19 September: the first inbound vessel, the bulk carrier Resilient Africa, successfully called in and out of the port of Chornomorsk using the "unilateral: corridor.
- 13 October: Russia had destroyed 300,000 tons of grain in Black Sea and Danube river ports, hitting six civilian ships and 150 facilities in 17 attacks, since July 2023.
- 16 October: Ali Najafov a Liberian flagged and Turkish-owned oil products tanker was damaged by a sea mine near the coast of Romania. There was minor damage and no injuries.
- 16 October: Seven warships of NATO countries Bulgaria and Romania begin patrols and mine-sweeping operations along Ukraine's recently established commercial shipping lane, having made the decision to protect the shipping lane at a meeting just 4 days previously.
- 8 November: The Liberian flagged civilian ship Kmax Ruler entering the Port of Pivdennyi, in Odesa, was hit by a Russian missile, killing the port pilot and injuring crew members.
- 15 November: 115 ships have passed out through the temporary maritime corridor since August.
- 16 November: The Liberian flagged Georgia S, bulk carrier transporting wheat, was slightly damaged after hitting a floating mine.
- 27 December: The Panama flagged Vyssos, an empty bulk carrier, was damaged by a mine, forcing it to beach in shallow waters, with two injured.
- 31 December 2023: Ukraine had moved 13 million tons by sea on 430 vessels, since the grain initiative had ceased.

== See also ==
- Peace negotiations in the Russian invasion of Ukraine
- Russia–Turkey relations
- Russia–Ukraine relations
- Turkey–Ukraine relations
- United States grain embargo against the Soviet Union
