= List of ambassadors of Georgia to China =

Coordinates: 39.961717°N 116.469409°E

Ambassador of Georgia (country) to China
- Incumbent; Archil Kalandia since December 18, 2018
- Inaugural holder: Mikheil Ukleba
- Formation: 2005

The Georgian ambassador in Beijing is the official representative of the Government in Tbilisi to the Government of the People's Republic of China.

== History ==
- On 9 June 1992 Georgia and People's Republic of China signed the Protocol on the establishment of diplomatic relations

== List of representatives ==
Diplomatic accreditation	ambassador	Observations	en:Prime Minister of Georgia	Premier of the People's Republic of China	Term end
2005	Mikheil Ukleba	Mikheil Ukleba	Zurab Noghaideli	Wen Jiabao	March 2008
March 2008	Zaza Begashvili		Lado Gurgenidze	Wen Jiabao	December 2008
2009	Karlo Kaha Sikharulidze		Nika Gilauri	Wen Jiabao	2011
December 5, 2011	Mamuka Gamkrelidze		Nika Gilauri	Wen Jiabao	2013
2014	David Aptsiauri		Irakli Garibashvili	Li Keqiang	
