= Embassy of Turkey, Kyiv =

Diplomatic mission of Turkey in Ukraine

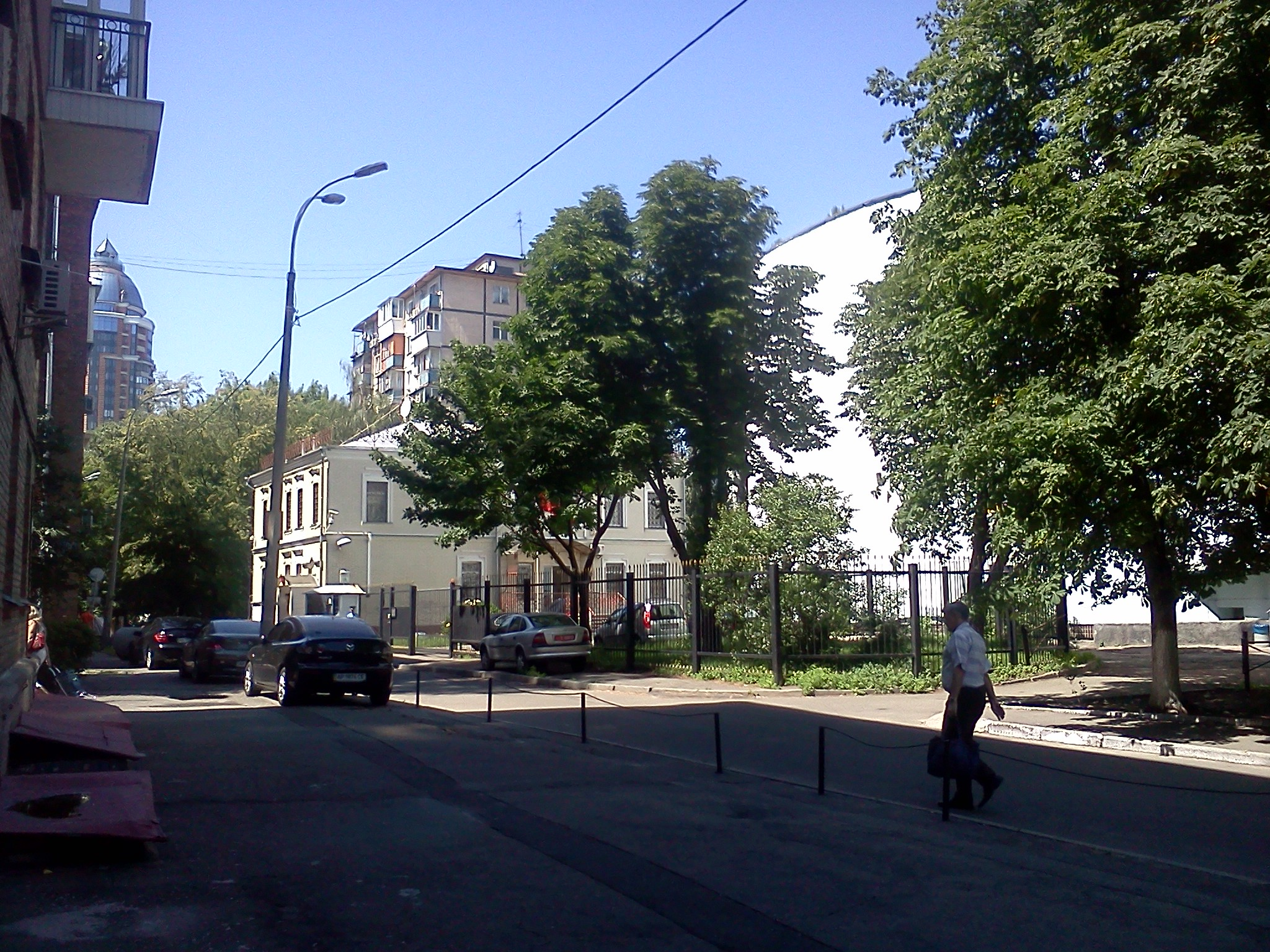
- Location: Kyiv
- Address: Arsenalna Street, 18, Kyiv 01901, Ukraine
- Coordinates: 50.4312°N 30.5374°E
- Ambassador: M. Levent Bilgen
- Website: https://kiev-emb.mfa.gov.tr/Mission

The Embassy of the Republic of Turkey in Kyiv is the diplomatic mission of Turkey, located in Ukraine. Turkey also has a consulate general in Odesa located on Leontovycha Street.

== History ==
On February 9, 1918, Turkey signed the Treaty of Brest-Litovsk, which recognized the Ukrainian National Republic as an independent and sovereign state. Turkey ratified this treaty on August 22, 1918. After the ratification, Ukraine and Turkey exchanged embassies. Ahmet Muhtar Mollaoğlu was the ambassador of the Turkish embassy in Ukraine.

On December 16, 1991, after the restoration of state independence in Ukraine on August 24, 1991, the Turkish Republic recognized the country of Ukraine. On November 20, 1991, Ukraine and Turkey established consul relations. On February 3, 1992, a signed protocol established diplomatic relations between the two countries. On April 3, 1992, the Kyiv Embassy of Turkey was established. On January 3, 1993 in Ankara, Turkey, the embassy began its work in Ukraine. In Dnipro, Ukraine, honorary consulates were hired in the Consulate General of the Republic of Turkey, located in Odesa, Ukraine.

In March 2022, during the 2022 Russian invasion of Ukraine, the embassy moved to Chernivtsi, closer to the western border of the country with Romania. The embassy returned to Kyiv on 5 April 2022.

== Previous Ambassadors ==
1. Ahmet Muhtar Mollaoğlu (1918);
2. Rıza Nur (1922);
3. Edgar Harmon (1992 - 1997);
4. Alp Karaosmanoğlu (1997 - 2002);
5. Ali Bilge Cankorel (2002 - 2006);
6. Erdoğan Şerif İşcan (2006 - 2009);
7. Ahmet Bülent Meriç (2009 - 2011);
8. Mehmet Samsar (2011-2014);
9. Yönet Can Tezel (2014-2018);
10. Yağmur Ahmet Güldere (2018-2023);
11. M. Levent Bilgen (2023-).

== See also ==
- Turkey-Ukraine relations
- Foreign relations of Turkey
- Foreign relations of Ukraine
- Embassy of Ukraine, Ankara
- Diplomatic missions in Ukraine
- Diplomatic missions of Turkey
