= Embassy of Denmark, Kyiv =

Embassy of Denmark in Kyiv
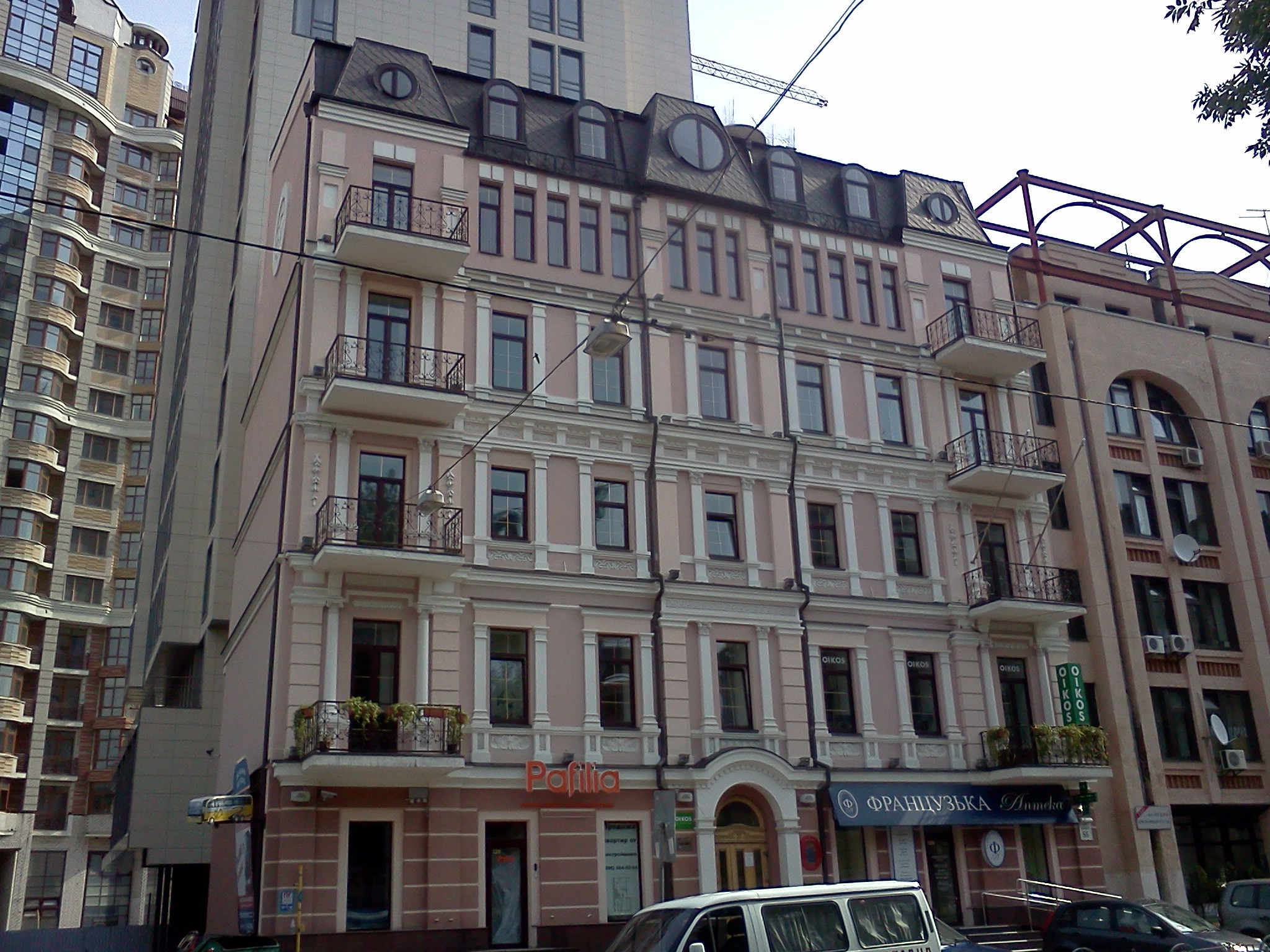
- Location: Kyiv
- Address: Gogolivska str, 8 Kyiv 01054, Ukraine
- Coordinates: 50.4495°N 30.4977°E
- Ambassador: Thomas Lund Sørensen

The Embassy of the Kingdom of Denmark in Kyiv (Danish: Danmarks ambassade i Kiev) is the diplomatic mission of Denmark in Ukraine.

The embassy was also accredited to Georgia, until the establishment of a resident embassy in Tbilisi in 2022.

== History ==
Following the independence of Ukraine on 24 August 1991, Denmark recognized the latter on 31 December 1991. Formal diplomatic relations was established months later, on 12 February 1992.

As a result of the 2022 Russian invasion of Ukraine, the embassy was closed on 22 February 2022 and reopened again on 2 May 2022.

== Previous Ambassadors ==
1. Christian Faber-Rod (1992–1997)
2. Jorn Krogbeck (1997–2001)
3. Martin Kofod (2001–2002)
4. Christian Faber-Rod (2002–2005)
5. Uffe Andersson Balslev (2005–2009)
6. Michael Borg-Hansen (2009–2013)
7. Merete Juhl (2013–2017)
8. Ruben Madsen (2017–2020)
9. Ole Egberg Mikkelsen (2020–2025)
10. Thomas Lund Sørensen (2025-)

== See also ==
- Denmark–Ukraine relations
- Foreign relations of Denmark
- Foreign relations of Ukraine
- Embassy of Ukraine, Copenhagen
- Diplomatic missions in Ukraine
- Diplomatic missions of Denmark
