= Denmark–Ukraine relations =

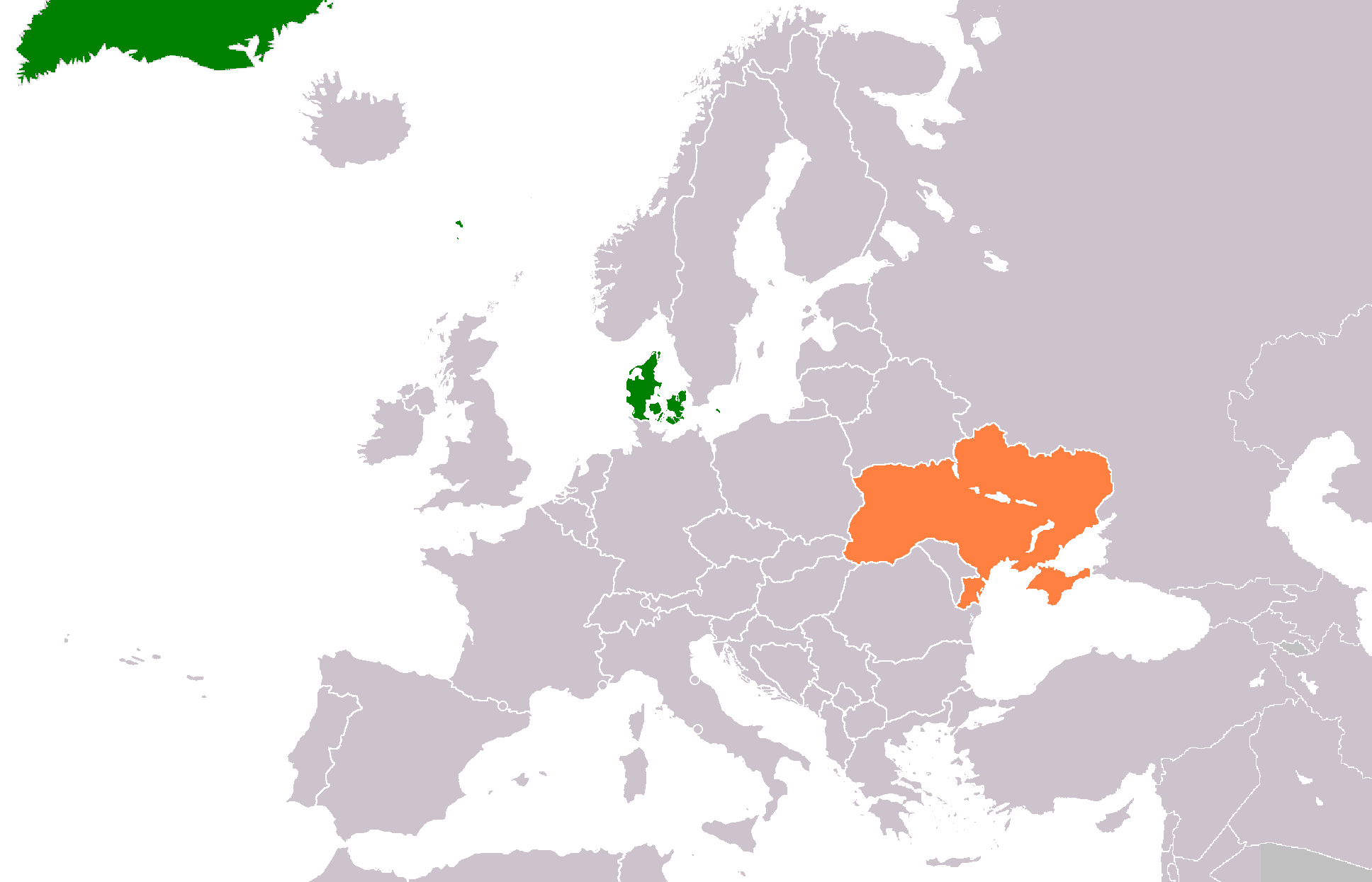
- Denmark: Ukraine

Denmark–Ukraine relations are the current and historical relations between Denmark and Ukraine. Denmark recognized Ukraine on 31 December 1991, and diplomatic relations were established on 12 February 1992.

Denmark supports Ukraine in line with the Eastern Partnership and has contributed to reforming various Ukrainian sectors. Denmark has been described as a key partner for Ukraine. Denmark is a member of the NATO and EU, which Ukraine applied for in 2022. Both countries are members of the Council of Europe and the United Nations.

Denmark has since the Russian invasion of Ukraine aided the Armed Forces of Ukraine with around 8.5 billion euros.

== Early ties ==
In 1918 or 1919, Denmark recognized the Ukrainian People's Republic.

From 1921 to 1991, Ukraine was part of the Soviet Union as the Ukrainian Soviet Socialist Republic. Denmark on the other hand is member of the Western Bloc, being a founding member of NATO. The two countries had no official ties during this period and diplomacy was conducted with the Soviet Union in the Danish embassy in Moscow.

Following the independence of Ukraine on 24 August 1991, Denmark recognized the latter on 31 December 1991. Formal diplomatic relations was established weeks later, on 12 February 1992.

== Modern ties ==
During the Danish Presidency of the Council of the European Union, Prime Minister of Denmark Anders Fogh Rasmussen welcomed Ukraine in the European Union but said that Ukraine needed more reforms before they can join the European Union. In 2004, to strengthen ties with Ukraine, Denmark opened an embassy in Ukraine.

Denmark supported the EU membership candidate status for Ukraine in 2022.

In 2022, after Mykolaiv, Ukraine was partially destroyed by Russia during the Russian Invasion of Ukraine, President Zelenskyy asked the Danish Parliament for reconstruction aid. The Danish government has directed $250 million dollars to Mykolaiv as of 2025. The city is being used as a test bed for assistance policies that could be applied across Ukraine, and is supported by nonprofit groups such as the Danish Refugee Council and international agencies like the United Nations.

== High level visits ==
Danish Foreign Minister Niels Helveg Petersen visited Ukraine in September 1998, during the visit, both countries signed an intergovernmental protocol on financial cooperation. In March 2007, President of Ukraine Viktor Yushchenko visited Denmark, to hold meetings with Danish officials about signing energy, agricultural and food cooperation agreements. In May 2011, Ukrainian Prime Minister Mykola Azarov invited Crown Prince Frederik to Ukraine.

On 30 January 2023 Prime Minister of Denmark Mette Frederiksen visited Ukraine and met President of Ukraine Volodymyr Zelenskyy in Mykolaiv, where they discussed the operational situation on the Southern front of the Russian invasion of Ukraine.

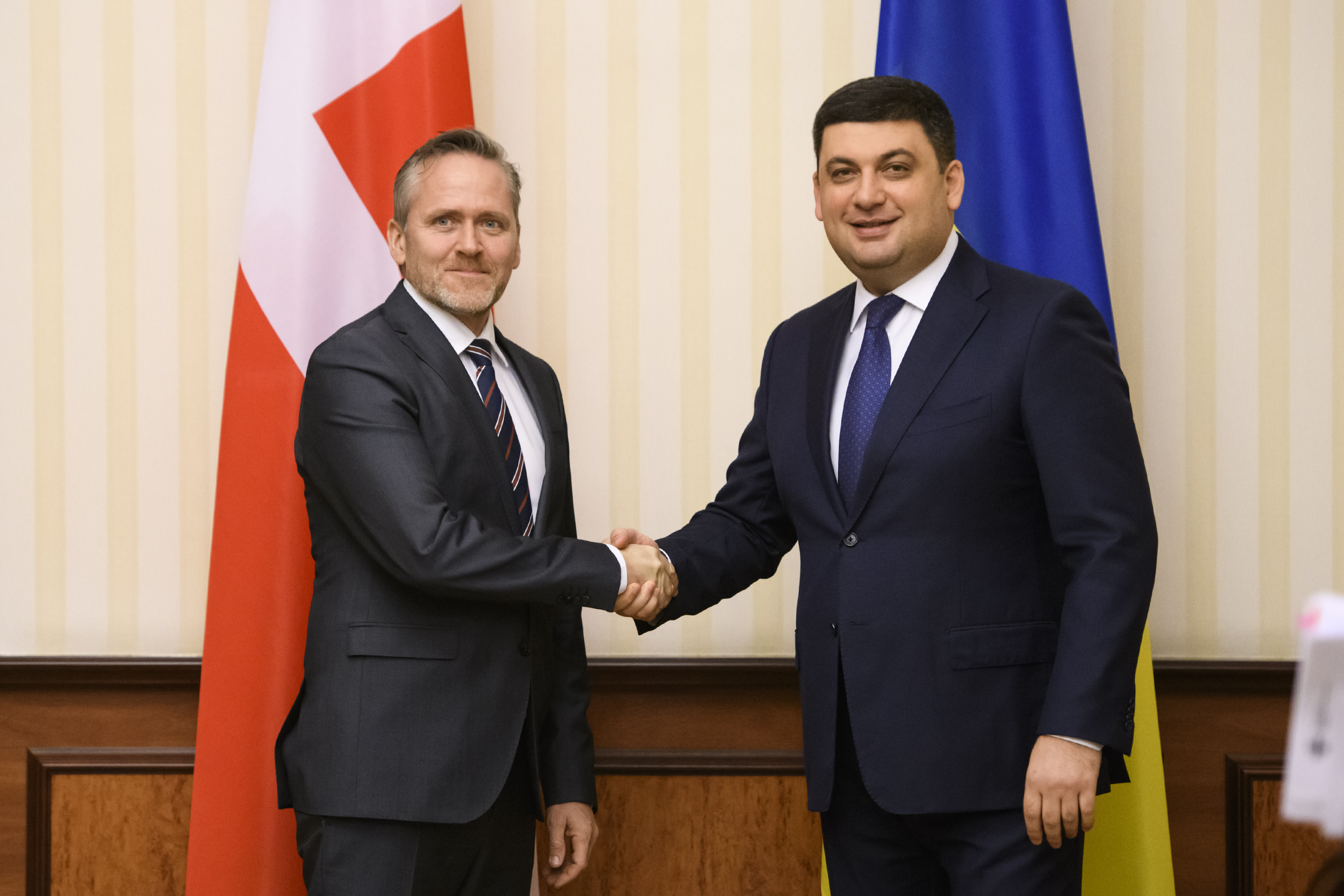
Anders Samuelsen and Volodymyr Groysman in Kyiv, 2018

== Military cooperation ==
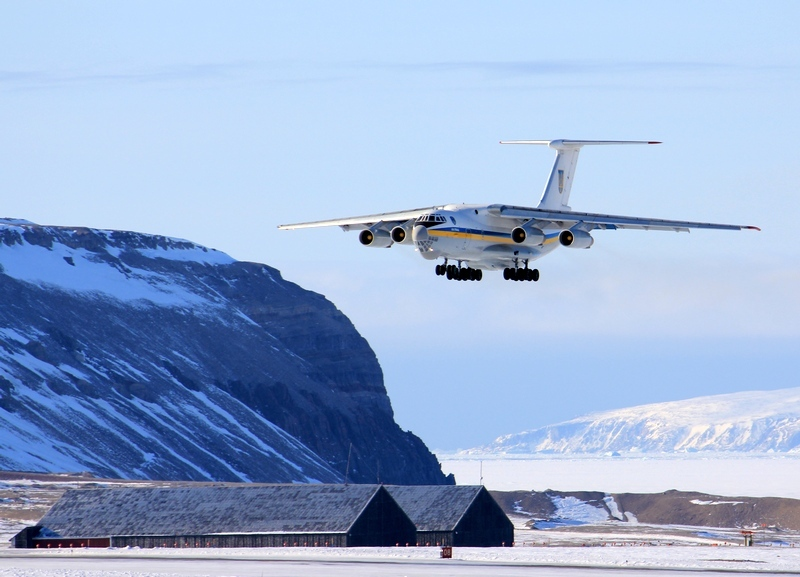
Ukrainian Air Force Il-76MD at Thule Air Base during "Northern Falcon"

=== Operation "Northern Falcon" (2009) ===
In March 2009, in Thule Air Base, American, Danish and Ukrainian air forces transported about 140,000 gallons of fuel and 17 tons of supplies from Thule Air Base to Station Nord, which is 1,000 kilometres (600 mi) away. Ukraine assisted with an Ilyushin Il-76.

=== Assistance to the Armed Forces of Ukraine (2014–2023) ===
Denmark began taking part in the NATO-led capacity building of the Armed Forces of Ukraine in 2014 after the war in Donbas. Denmark has taken part in the British-led training mission Operation Interflex after 2015 with a staff office, training teams, translators. Moreover, soldiers from the Royal Danish Navy and Royal Danish Army have trained Ukrainian soldiers as well.

In January 2022, Denmark supported Ukraine with 164 million DKK to support the Ukrainian defense as the Russo-Ukrainian crisis was continuing.

In January 2023, the Danish Ministry of Defence announced that they would further support Ukraine by donating 19 French-made CAESAR self-propelled howitzers. Though as a further delay to Denmark's own military build-up.

In May 2023, the Danish Parliament supported the donation of 1.7 billion DKK in military equipment to support Ukraine's offensive operations in the Russian invasion of Ukraine, including armoured recovery vehicles, engineering vehicles, demining equipment, ammunition and armoured vehicle-launched bridges.

=== Assistance from the Armed Forces of Ukraine (2025) ===
Following the 2025 Danish drone incidents the General Staff of the Ukrainian Armed Forces reported that a Ukrainian military delegation visited Denmark and successfully demonstrated their Sting interceptor drone against a QinetiQ Banshee target drone.

== Resident diplomatic missions ==
- Denmark has an embassy in Kyiv.
- Ukraine has an embassy in Copenhagen.
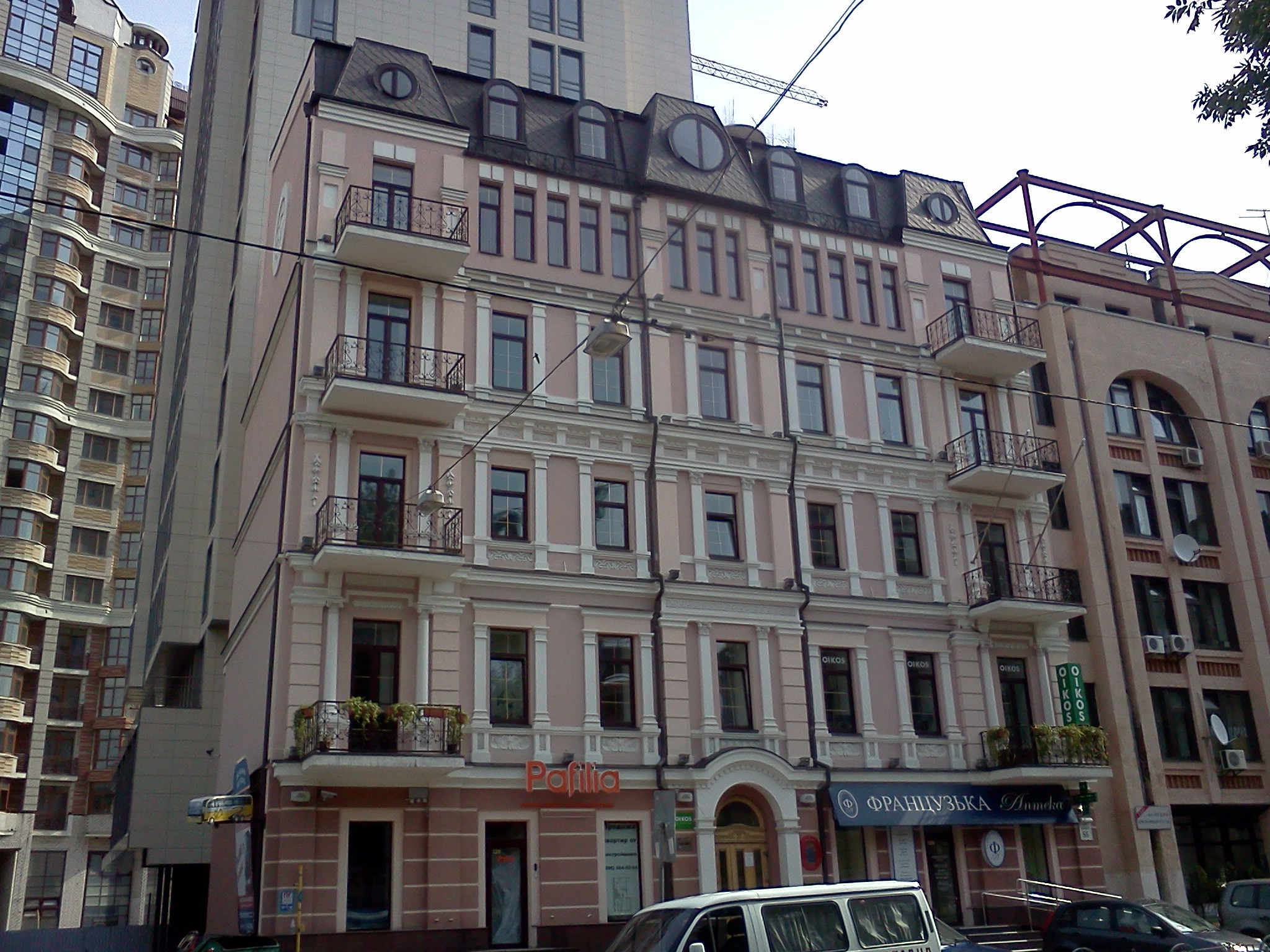
Embassy of Denmark in Kyiv

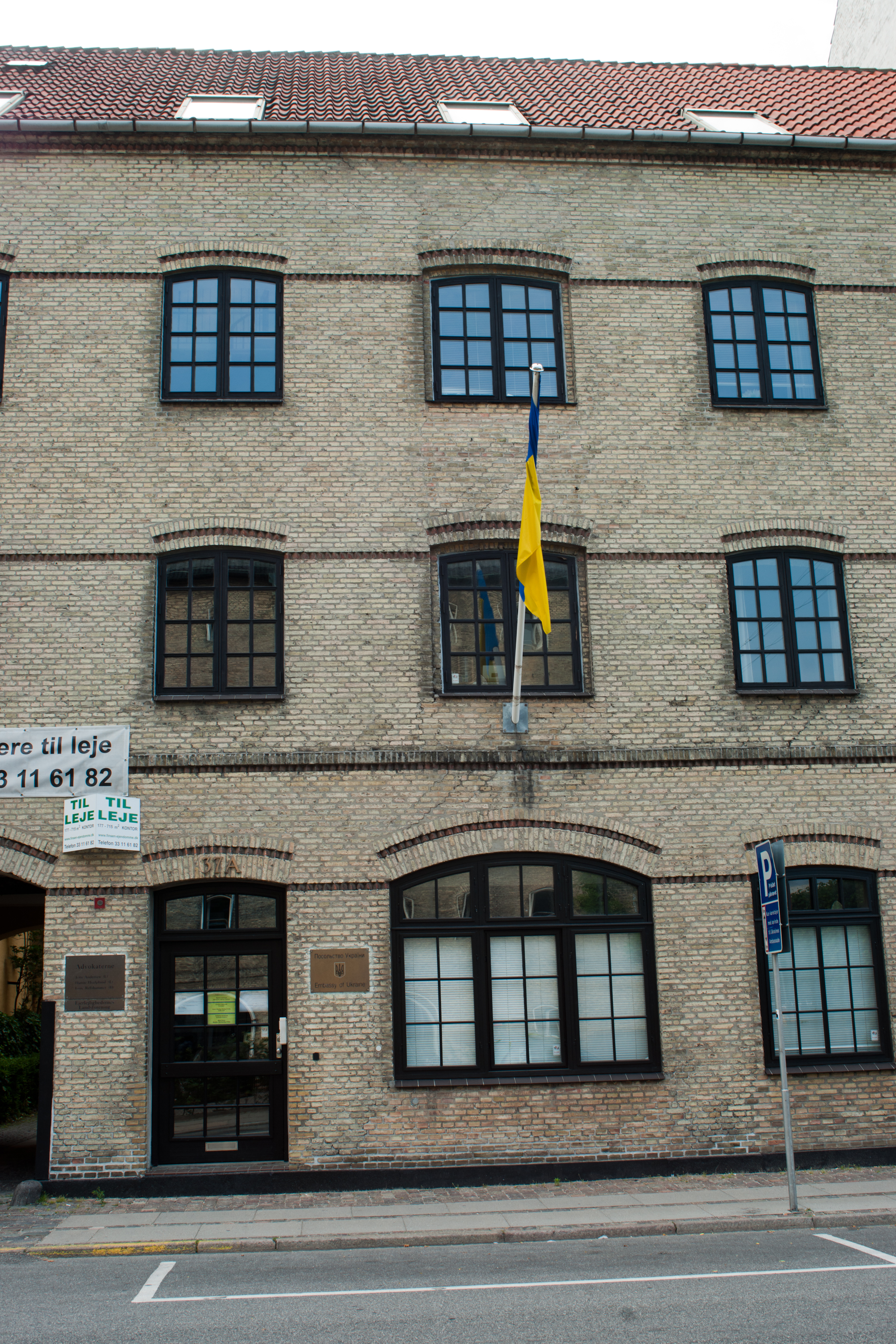
Embassy of Ukraine in Copenhagen

== See also ==
- Foreign relations of Denmark
- Foreign relations of Ukraine
- Ukraine-NATO relations
- Ukraine-EU relations
  - Accession of Ukraine to the EU
