= List of diplomatic missions in Ukraine =

This article lists resident diplomatic missions in Ukraine. At present, the capital city of Kyiv hosts 75 embassies. Several other countries have accredited non-resident diplomatic representation based out of their embassies from other European regional capitals, particularly Berlin and Warsaw.

This listing excludes honorary consulates.

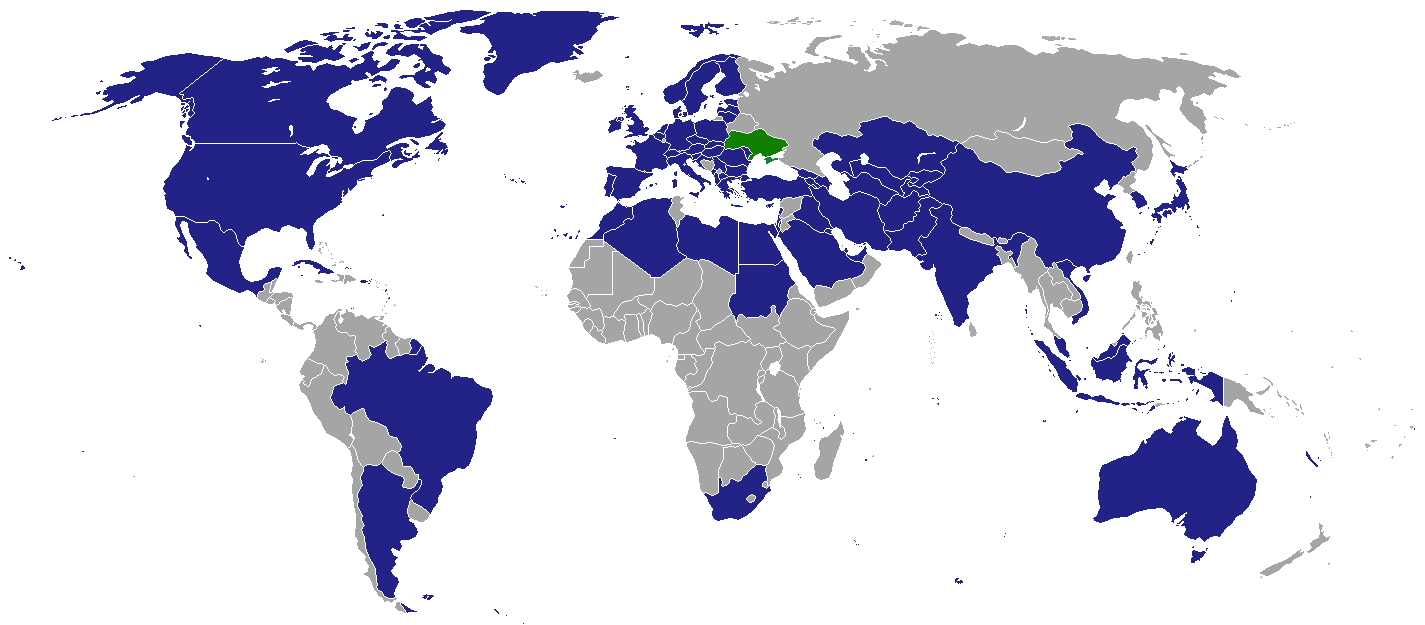
Map of diplomatic missions in Ukraine

== Diplomatic missions in Kyiv ==
Country	Mission type	Photo
Afghanistan	Embassy	
Albania	Embassy	
Algeria	Embassy	
Argentina	Embassy	
Armenia	Embassy	
Australia	Embassy	
Austria	Embassy	
Azerbaijan	Embassy	
Belgium	Embassy	
Brazil	Embassy	
Bulgaria	Embassy	
Canada	Embassy	
China	Embassy	
Croatia	Embassy	
Cuba	Embassy	
Cyprus	Embassy	-
Czech Republic	Embassy	-
Denmark	Embassy	
Egypt	Embassy	
Estonia	Embassy	
European Union	Delegation	
Finland	Embassy	
France	Embassy	-
Georgia	Embassy	
Germany	Embassy	
Greece	Embassy	
Holy See	Apostolic Nunciature	
Hungary	Embassy	
India	Embassy	
Indonesia	Embassy	
Iran	Embassy	
Iraq	Embassy	
Ireland	Embassy	
Israel	Embassy	
Italy	Embassy	
Japan	Embassy	
Kazakhstan	Embassy	
Kuwait	Embassy	
Kyrgyzstan	Embassy	
Latvia	Embassy	
Lebanon	Embassy	-
Libya	Embassy	
Lithuania	Embassy	
Malaysia	Embassy	-
Mexico	Embassy	
Moldova	Embassy	-
Montenegro	Embassy	-
Morocco	Embassy	
North Macedonia	Embassy	
Netherlands	Embassy	-
Norway	Embassy	-
Pakistan	Embassy	
Palestine	Embassy	-
Poland	Embassy	
Portugal	Embassy	
Qatar	Embassy	-
Romania	Embassy	
Serbia	Embassy	
Saudi Arabia	Embassy	
Slovakia	Embassy	
Slovenia	Embassy	
South Africa	Embassy	
Republic of Korea	Embassy	
Sovereign Military Order of Malta	Embassy	
Spain	Embassy	
Sudan	Embassy	
Sweden	Embassy	
Switzerland	Embassy	
Tajikistan	Embassy	
Turkey	Embassy	
Turkmenistan	Embassy	
United Kingdom	Embassy	
United Arab Emirates	Embassy	-
United States	Embassy	
Uzbekistan	Embassy	
Vietnam	Embassy	

== Diplomatic missions in other cities ==
=== Berehove ===
- Hungary (Consulate)

=== Chernivtsi ===
- Romania (Consulate-General)

=== Lutsk ===
- Poland (Consulate-General)

=== Lviv ===
- Czech Republic (Consulate-General)
- Poland (Consulate-General)
- United Kingdom (Embassy Office)

=== Odesa ===
- Armenia (Consulate-General)
- Bulgaria (Consulate-General)
- China (Consulate-General)
- Georgia (Consulate-General)
- Greece (Consulate-General)
- Moldova (Consulate-General)
- Romania (Consulate-General)
- Turkey (Consulate-General)

=== Solotvyno ===
- Romania (Consulate)

=== Uzhhorod ===
- Hungary (Consulate-General)
- Slovakia (Consulate-General)

=== Vinnytsia ===
- Poland (Consulate-General)

== Non-resident embassies accredited to Ukraine ==
=== Resident in Ankara, Turkey ===
- Ghana
- Jordan
- Sri Lanka

=== Resident in Berlin, Germany ===
- Burkina Faso
- Cambodia
- Dominican Republic
- Ethiopia
- Haiti
- Jamaica
- Lesotho
- Malawi
- Mauritania
- Nepal
- Oman
- Paraguay
- Rwanda
- Togo
- Uganda

=== Resident in Warsaw, Poland ===
- Angola
- Bangladesh
- Chile
- Colombia
- Guatemala
- Guinea-Bissau
- Iceland
- Mongolia
- New Zealand
- Panama
- Peru
- Philippines
- Senegal
- Thailand
- Tunisia
- Uruguay
- Yemen

=== Resident elsewhere ===
- Bosnia and Herzegovina (Budapest)
- Botswana (Stockholm)
- Brunei (Geneva)
- Ecuador (Vienna)
- Eswatini (Geneva)
- Kenya (Vienna)
- Luxembourg (Prague)
- Maldives (Brussels)
- Malta (Valletta)
- San Marino (Rome)
- Singapore (Singapore)
- Somalia (Belgrade)
- Tanzania (Stockholm)

== Closed embassies and missions ==
=== Temporarily closed ===
Closed or relocated embassies and consulates, due to the ongoing Russian invasion of Ukraine.

- Nigeria (Operating from Vilnius, Lithuania)

=== Closed missions ===
Host city	Sending country	Mission	Year closed	Ref.
Kyiv	Belarus	Embassy	2022	
Kyiv	Peru	Embassy (Note: Resident in Warsaw, Poland)	2006	
Kyiv	Russia	Embassy	2022	
Kyiv	Syria	Embassy	2018	
Donetsk	Czech Republic	Consulate-General	2014	
Donetsk	Georgia	Consulate-General	2014	
Donetsk	Germany	Consulate-General	2014	
Donetsk	Poland	Consulate-General	2014	
Kharkiv	Russia	Consulate-General	2022	
Lviv	Russia	Consulate-General	2022	
Mariupol	Greece	Consulate-General	2022	
Odesa	Belarus	Consulate-General	2018	
Odesa	India	Consulate-General	1999	
Odesa	Russia	Consulate-General	2022	
Sevastopol	Poland	Consulate-General	2014	
Simferopol	Russia	Consulate-General	2014	

== See also ==
- Foreign relations of Ukraine
- List of diplomatic missions of Ukraine
