= Turkey–Ukraine relations =

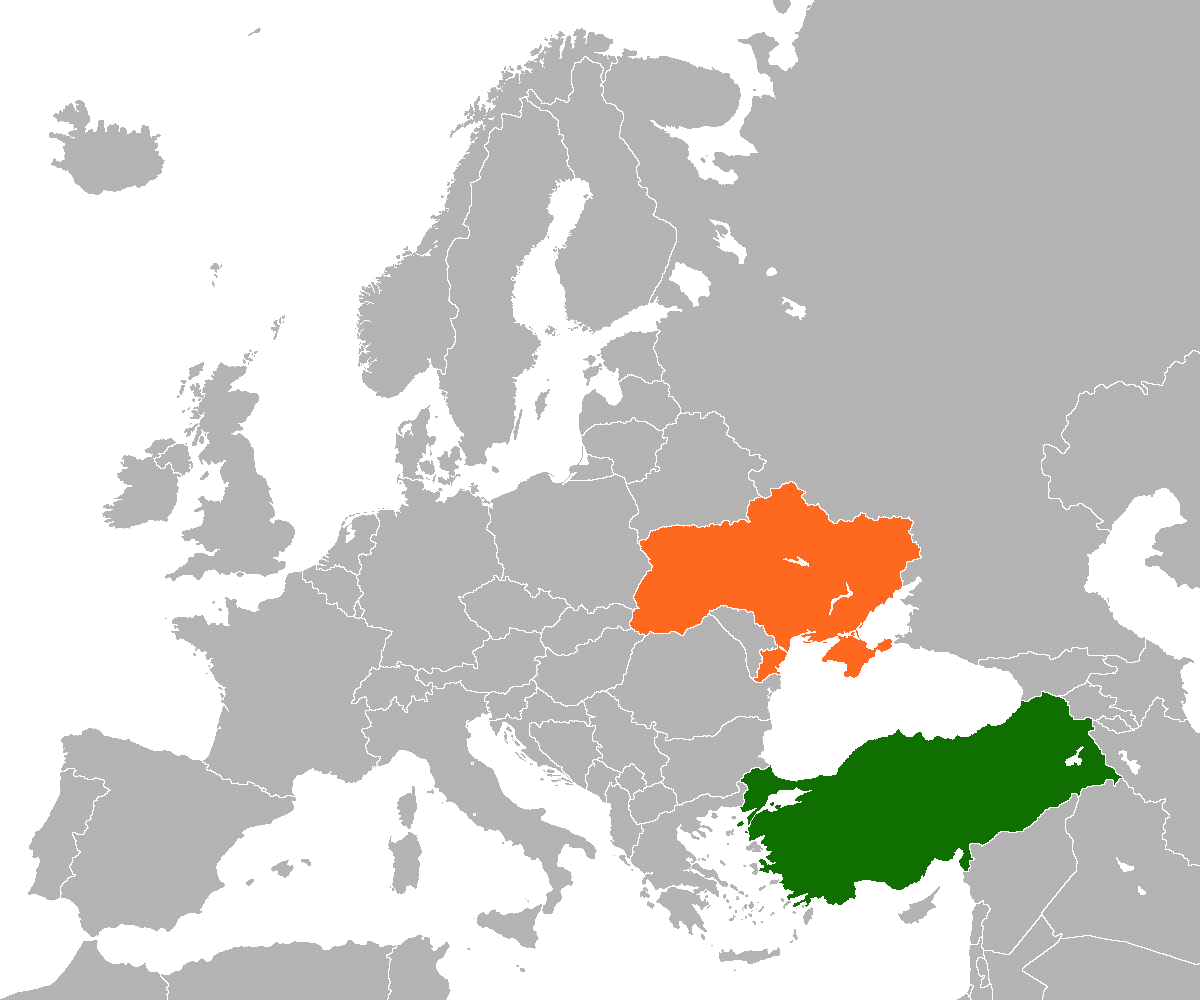
- Turkey: Ukraine

Diplomatic mission
- Embassy of Turkey, Kyiv: Embassy of Ukraine, Ankara

Turkey and Ukraine have a long chronology of historical, geographic, and cultural contact. Diplomatic relations between the countries were established in the early 1990s when Turkey became one of the first countries in the world to recognize Ukrainian sovereign and independence. Turkey has an embassy in Kyiv and a consulate general in Odesa. Ukraine has an embassy in Ankara and a consulate general in Istanbul. Turkey is a full member of NATO, and Ukraine is a candidate for NATO membership. Also, both countries are members of the Black Sea Naval Force and the Organization of the Black Sea Economic Cooperation.

== Historical relations ==
=== Ottoman empire ===
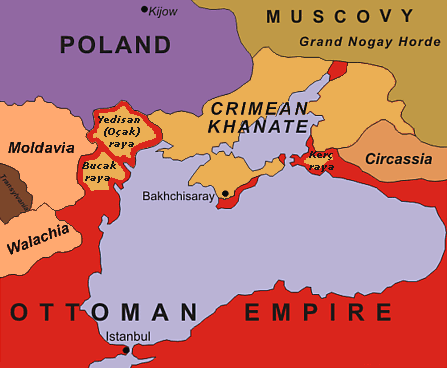
Black Sea Region in 1600

The Ottoman Empire began to dominate the Black Sea region in the second half of the 15th century. In 1475, it conquered the Genovese colonies on the Crimean Peninsula, and in 1478, the Crimean Khanate recognized the Ottoman Empire's suzerainty, becoming a vassal state of the Ottomans. In the late 15th century, the Crimean Tatars began a 200-year campaign of raids on Ukrainian territories, independently and jointly with the Ottomans, to capture slaves and goods that were sold in markets in the Middle East. Some kidnapped slaves attained high positions among the Janissaries, while many other Ukrainians (and Tatars) were promoted to numerous senior positions. Likely the most well-known among these is the case of Ruthenian woman Roxelana, who became one of the most powerful and influential women in the history of the Ottoman Empire as the wife of the Ottoman Sultan Suleiman the Magnificent and a Haseki sultan. In the 15th–17th centuries, the Ottomans and the Crimean Khanate were in constant contact with the Ukrainian Cossacks (whose emergence was partly a reaction to Ottoman and Tatar raids) and the Polish–Lithuanian Commonwealth.

With the rise of the Zaporozhian Cossacks in the mid-16th century, the Cossacks mounted organized resistance and carried out attacks on Turkish-Tatar centers in southern Ukraine and on the Ottoman heartland, even attacking Istanbul several times. However, Ukrainian Cossack leaders also sought alliances with the Ottomans: in 1669, Hetman Petro Doroschenko submitted to the Ottoman Sultan in order to obtain support in the fight against Poland. The Ottomans then briefly ruled parts of right-bank Ukraine, but were largely pushed back by the end of the 17th century. With the conquest of the Crimea by Russia in 1774–1783, Ottoman influence in southern Ukraine came to an end. Following the annexation of Crimea in 1783, large sections of the Muslim population emigrated to the Ottoman Empire, reaching a total of around 1.8 million Crimean Tatars fleeing to Turkey by 1922. Their descendants (estimated at 3–5 million people) still form a significant community of Crimean Tatar descent in Turkey today.

=== Ukrainian People's Republic and Soviet Era ===
During the First World War, the Ottoman Empire was one of the first powers to recognize the independent Ukrainian People's Republic. On February 9, 1918, the Central Rada of the Ukrainian People's Republic signed a peace treaty with the Central Powers (Treaty of Brest-Litovsk), in which the Ottomans recognized Ukraine as a sovereign state and exchanged diplomatic missions. Even after the founding of the Ukrainian SSR in 1922, the young Republic of Turkey initially maintained separate political, economic, and cultural contacts with Soviet Ukraine and concluded a friendship treaty (“Treaty of Friendship and Brotherhood”). From 1923, however, these relations were completely integrated into the diplomatic framework of the Soviet Union, so that by 1991, there were no longer any independent bilateral relations between Ankara and Kyiv. Since Turkey was neutral at first and then became part of NATO in 1952, cultural and economic ties with the Ukrainian Soviet Republic remained rather limited.

=== Independent Ukraine and Turkey ===
Turkey recognized Ukraine diplomatically immediately after its secession from the USSR on December 16, 1991. Formal diplomatic relations were established on February 3, 1992, and both countries opened embassies in Ankara and Kyiv. Both countries cooperated in regional initiatives such as the Black Sea Economic Cooperation (BSEC), founded in 1992. After the Orange Revolution, contacts deepened further. In 2004, an action plan to strengthen relations was adopted, and in 2011, the presidents of both countries agreed to establish a High Strategic Council for closer mutual coordination, giving the relationship the status of a strategic partnership.

In late January 2010 Ukrainian President Viktor Yanukovych and Turkish Prime Minister Recep Tayyip Erdoğan agreed to form a free trade zone between the two countries during 2011. But bilateral free trade talks were put on hold in 2013.

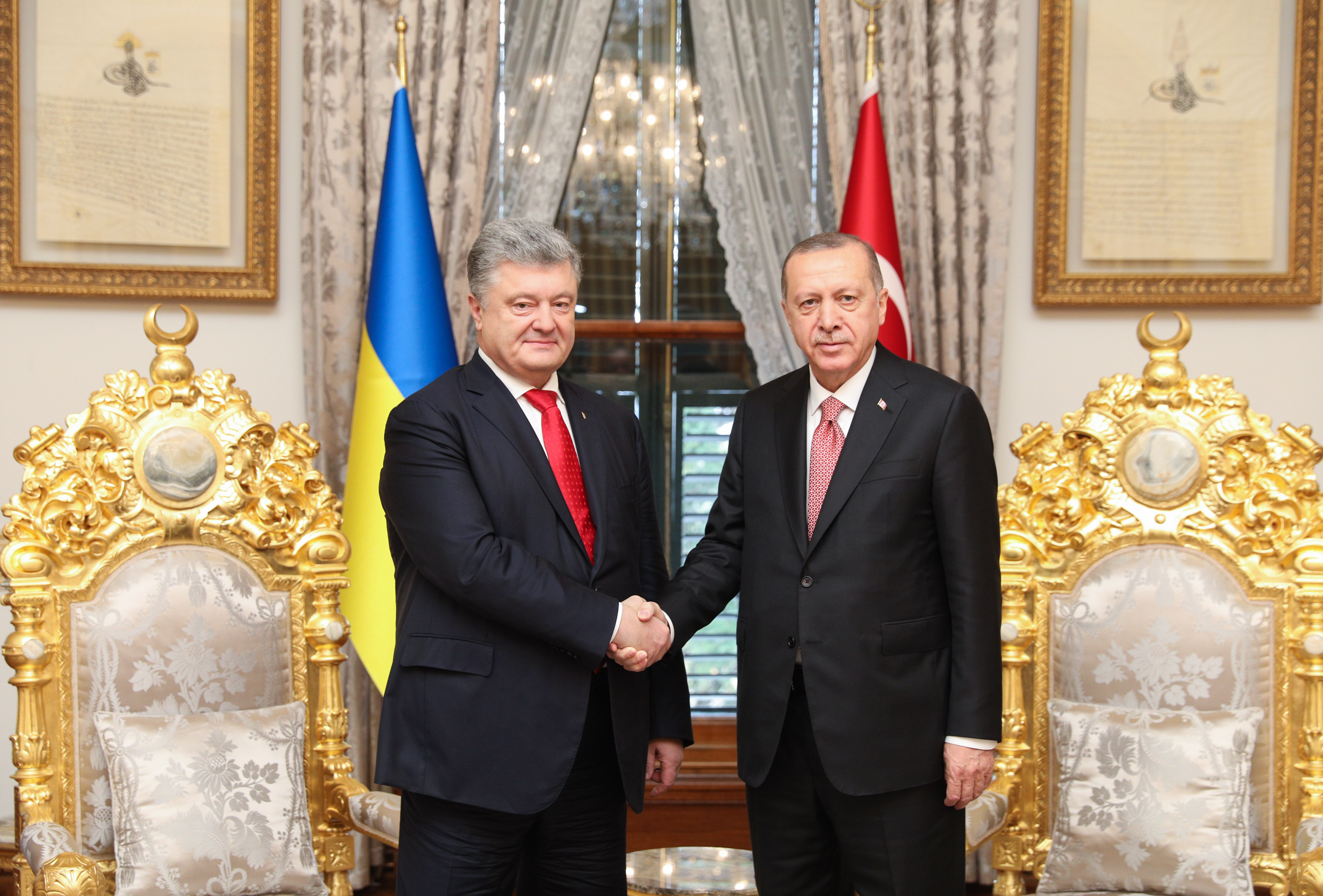
Ukrainian President Petro Poroshenko meeting with Turkish President Recep Tayyip Erdoğan in Istanbul, 3 November 2018

Following the end of 2015, Turkey and Ukraine experienced closer relations as a result of both countries' increasingly strained relationship with Russia. On 20 August 2016. Turkish President Recep Tayyip Erdoğan told his Ukrainian counterpart Petro Poroshenko that Turkey would not recognize the 2014 Russian annexation of Crimea, calling it "Crimea's occupation". On 9 January 2017. Turkey's Foreign Minister Mevlüt Çavuşoğlu stated. "We support the territorial integrity of Ukraine and Georgia. We do not recognize the annexation of the lands of Ukraine." Turkey's self-perception as the protective power of the Crimean Tatars also played a role in this. President Recep Tayyip Erdoğan stated in 2021: “Russia has usurped Crimea ... Things cannot go on with a mentality of occupation.”

In 2020/21, relations reached a new level. Ankara expressly supported Ukraine's rapprochement with NATO and the EU. In October 2020, a new consultation mechanism in the 2+2 format (a “quadriga” of foreign and defense ministers) was launched. On February 3, 2022, shortly before the start of the war, both governments signed a comprehensive free trade agreement after twelve years of negotiations.

==== Russo-Ukrainian war ====
After Russia's large-scale attack on Ukraine in February 2022, Turkey condemned the Russian invasion; however, the Turkish government broke ranks with all the other NATO members, refusing to impose any sanctions against Russia even to this day. On February 27, 2022, just a few days after the beginning of Russia's full-scale invasion of Ukraine, the Turkish government announced that it would strictly enforce the Montreux Convention and thus deny warships passage through the Turkish straits. At the same time, Ankara openly offered its services as a mediator. In March 2022, Turkey hosted the fourth and fifth rounds peace talks between Ukraine and Russia in Antalya. Although these talks did not lead to a breakthrough, Ankara achieved a significant success in the summer of 2022 with the signing of the Black Sea Grain Initiative in Istanbul to ensure the safe export of Ukrainian grain via the Black Sea. The agreement allowed grain to be shipped from Ukrainian ports under Turkish mediation until July 2023, before Russia let the agreement expire.

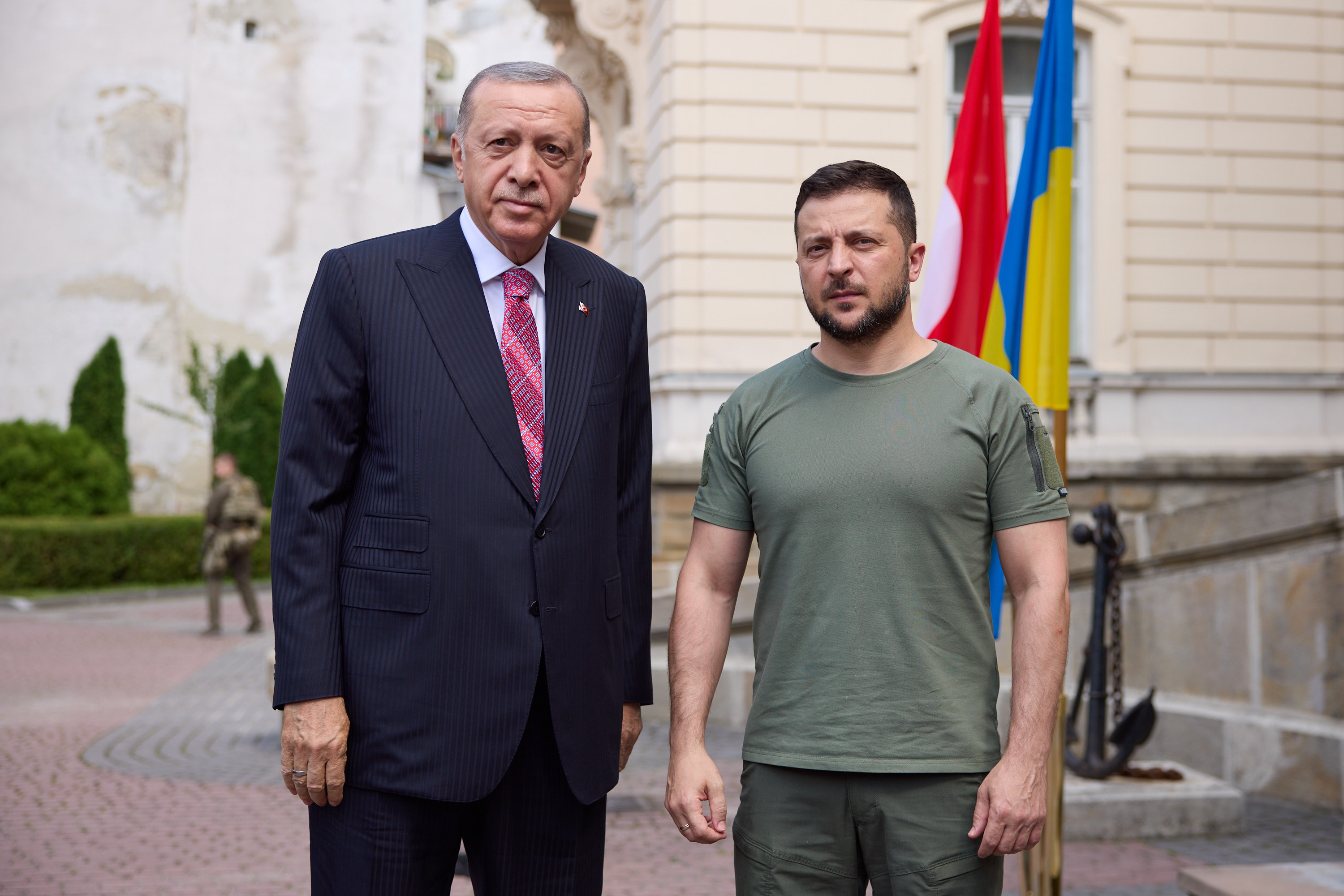
Turkish President Recep Tayyip Erdoğan meeting with Ukrainian President Volodymyr Zelenskyy in Lviv, 18 August 2022

As of April 2022, number of Ukrainian refugees in Turkey has reached up to 85,000.

In June 2025, Turkey once again hosted Russian-Ukrainian peace talks.

== Economic relations ==
Economic relations between Ukraine and Turkey have developed dynamically since 1991. Bilateral trade volume rose from around US$4.8 billion in 2019 to US$7.3 billion in 2023. Turkey ratified a bilateral free trade agreement in August 2024, which provides for the mutual abolition of customs duties on 95% of goods and is expected to increase bilateral trade volume to over US$10 billion.

Even before the agreement came into force, both countries enjoyed lively trade relations. Ukraine traditionally exports mainly raw materials and agricultural products (grain, oilseeds, metals) to Turkey, while Turkish industrial products (machinery, vehicles, textiles, chemical products) and consumer goods are supplied to Ukraine. Turkish companies are actively involved in infrastructure development in Ukraine. Approximately 600 Turkish companies have made investments in Ukraine, estimated at approximately US$3 billion, with many Turkish companies being particularly active in the construction sector. Thanks to visa-free travel introduced in 2017, 1.6 million Ukrainians visited Turkey in 2019, making them one of the largest groups of foreign tourists.

== Military relations ==
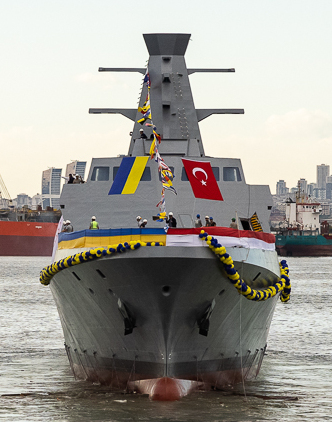
Ukrainian corvette Hetman Ivan Mazepa launched in İstanbul,3 October 2022

In 2019, Turkish unmanned aerial vehicle manufacturer Baykar sold TB2 Bayraktars to Ukraine. In 2020, Turkey sold numerous military equipment to Ukraine, including two Ada-class corvettes. Deliveries of TB2 Bayraktars to Ukraine began in 2021. Ukraine first used TB2s against Russian-backed rebels in the Donbas region on October 26, 2021, and released footage of the operation to the press. Russia strongly condemned the use of Turkish weapons and demanded that Turkey halt its arms exports to Ukraine.

In February 2020, President Recep Tayyip Erdoğan and President Volodymyr Zelenskyy signed an agreement on military-financial cooperation. It provided for the Turkish side to allocate about $36 million for the needs of the Armed Forces of Ukraine for the purchase of Turkish military and dual-use goods.

On October 3, 2022, the first Ukrainian warship built in Turkey, Hetman Ivan Mazepa, was launched. The second Ukrainian warship built in Turkey, Hetman Ivan Vyhovskyi, was launched on August 2, 2024.

Former NATO Secretary General Jens Stoltenberg stated that during a defense cooperation meeting between NATO and Ukraine, former Ukrainian President Petro Poroshenko told him that the United States and other NATO countries were not selling Ukraine the necessary weapons, and that only Turkey had been selling them prior to the war.

=== Russo-Ukrainian war ===
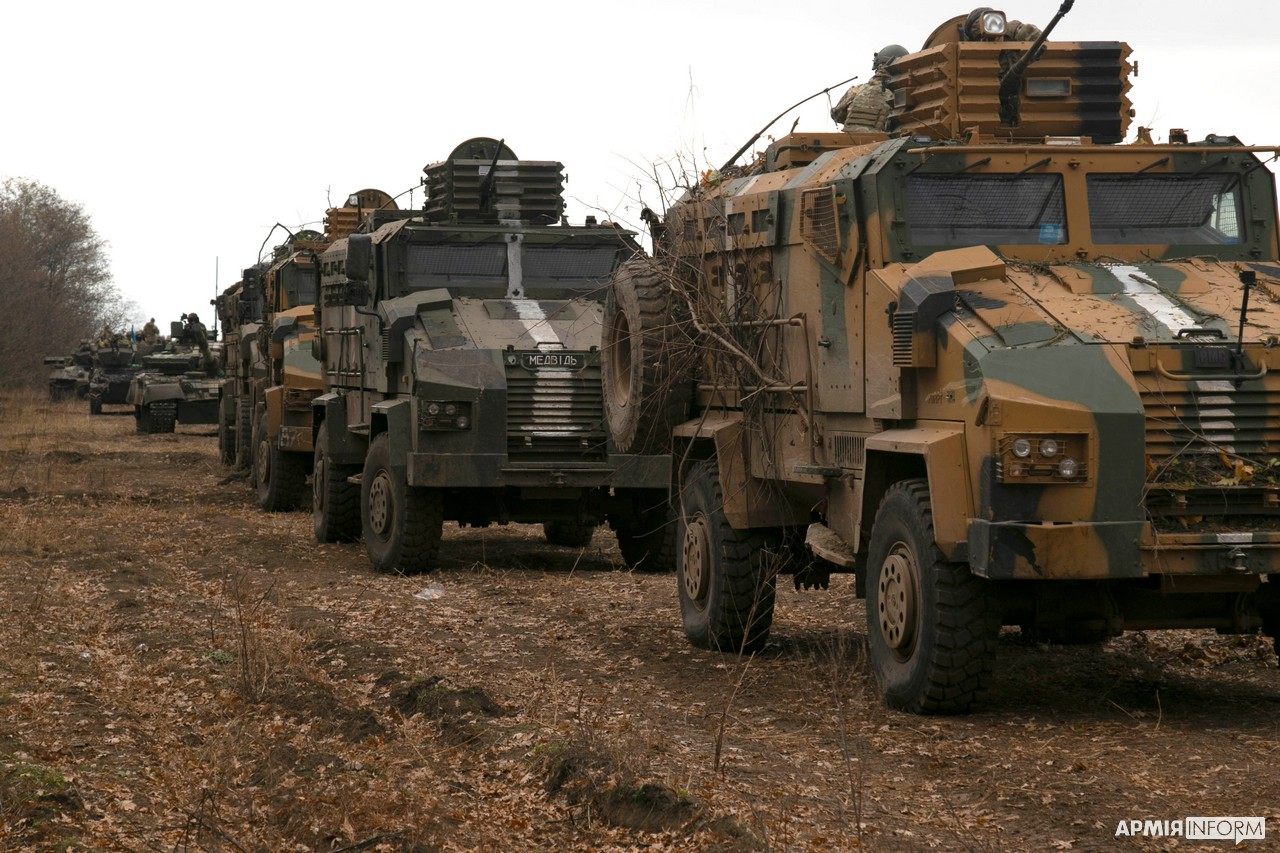
Turkish-made BMC Kirpi in Ukrainian Marine Corps service

On 3 February 2022, Turkish President Recep Tayyip Erdogan volunteered to organize a Ukraine-Russia conference during a visit to Ukraine, as EU leaders increased their outreach to the Kremlin to calm worries of a Russian invasion. As the crisis escalated, the Ukrainian ambassador to Turkey requested that Turkey close the nation's Black Sea-Mediterranean straits to Russian warships. However, on 25 February, the Republic of Turkey abstained from voting on Russia’s suspension from the Council of Europe, as it called for open dialogue between the parties under any circumstances. Turkish Foreign Minister Mevlüt Çavuşoğlu also reiterated Turkey's "readiness to host negotiations that could take place between the Russian Federation and Ukraine," accordingly. On 27 February 2022, Çavuşoğlu publicly stated that Turkey had shifted its terminology to refer to Russia's assault on Ukraine as a "war," and committed to enforce elements of the 1936 Montreux Convention's international pact, which allows Turkey to prohibit Russian warships from entering the Bosporus and Dardanelles and thus hinder Russian vessels' transit from the Mediterranean to the Black Sea. On 28 February, President Tayyip Erdogan publicly confirmed that the straits would be closed to prevent an escalation of the war, while also pledging to maintain relations with both Ukraine and Russia.

While Turkey has provided the Armed Forces of Ukraine with many advanced Bayraktar drones since 2019, which played a significant role in deterring Russian advances in the early stages of the 2022 Russian-Ukrainian War, it continues to remain the only NATO member state that has, even up to December 2025, continuously refused to impose international sanctions against Russia, which have been adopted and enforced by all the European Union and NATO member states, alongside numerous other countries, including Japan, Australia, New Zealand, South Korea, Federated States of Micronesia, the Bahamas, Taiwan (Republic of China), Switzerland, and Liechtenstein, following the 2022 Russian invasion of Ukraine.

On 3 May 2022, Ukrainian President Volodymyr Zelenskyy accused Turkey of having "double standards" by welcoming Russian tourists while attempting to act as an intermediary between Russia and Ukraine in order to end the war.

Ukraine's ambassador to Turkey said that Turkey is one of the countries that is buying grain that Russia stole from Ukraine.

On 17 July 2022, Russian, Ukrainian, and Turkish military delegations met with United Nations officials in Istanbul to start talks on the resumption of exports of Ukrainian grain from the Black Sea port of Odesa. On 22 July 2022, Russian and Ukrainian officials have signed the deal to allow grain exports from Ukrainian Black Sea ports. Under the agreement, a coalition of Turkish, Ukrainian, and UN staff will monitor the loading of grain into vessels in Ukrainian ports, to allay Russian fears of weapons smuggling before navigating a preplanned route through the Black Sea, which remains heavily mined by Ukrainian and Russian forces. On 29 October 2022, Russia said it was suspending its participation in the grain deal, in response to what it called a major Ukrainian drone attack on its Black Sea fleet. US President Joe Biden called the move "purely outrageous".

In August 2022, some news sources published images of Turkish-made Kirpi mine-resistant ambush protected vehicles being used by the Ukrainian Army. BMC Otomotiv, the manufacturer of the Kirpi vehicles, stated that it did not sell the vehicles to Ukraine and that the vehicles used by Ukraine were already in the Turkish army's inventory. Neither the Turkish nor the Ukrainian sides made any statements about the vehicles. A source who stated that they had received information from Ukrainian authorities claimed that Ukraine had received 200 Kirpi vehicles and that the first batch of 50 had been delivered.

In July 2023, Turkish President Recep Tayyip Erdogan declared that “there is no doubt that Ukraine deserves membership of NATO.”

Russian Foreign Minister Sergey Lavrov criticized Turkey for selling weapons to Ukraine despite Turkey acting as a mediator between Russia and Ukraine.

== Cultural relations ==
=== Abduction of Turkish dissidents ===
There has been a rise in the number of Turkish dissidents fleeing to Ukraine, following the violent crackdown launched by Turkish leader Erdoğan following the failed 2016 Turkish coup attempt. In 2018, the Turkish government pressured then-President of Ukraine, Petro Poroshenko, to extradite Turkish dissidents. Subsequently, Ukraine imprisoned and deported two Turkish journalists and a blogger, revoking their visas.

According to Radio Free Europe/Radio Liberty in February 2020, the Ukrainian government was found complicit in allowing the National Intelligence Organization (Turkish intelligence agency) to abduct Turkish dissidents, mostly those who linked with the Gülen movement; Kyiv had already deported several Gülenists back to Turkey in 2021.

=== Crimean Tatars ===
The Crimean Tatar community plays a special role: due to forced emigration since the 18th century, millions of people of Tatar-Crimean origin now live in Turkey. Ankara, in turn, supports the cultural and religious interests of the Crimean Tatars—for example, a memorial museum commemorating the deportation of the Crimean Tatars in 1944 under Stalin was opened in Turkey in 2015. On the Ukrainian side, Crimean Tatar culture is recognized as part of its own cultural heritage; in 2017, the Ukrainian government officially included the Crimean Tatars in the Council of the Ukrainian Diaspora.

=== Humanitarian relations ===
On February 6, 2023, two powerful earthquakes with magnitudes of 7.8 and 7.5 struck southern Turkey and northern Syria, causing widespread destruction and loss of life. According to the Turkish disaster agency, the earthquakes have killed more than 50,000 people in Turkey and over 8,000 people in Syria.

On the same day, Ukrainian Foreign Minister Dmytro Kuleba announced that Ukraine might send several dozen emergency workers to Turkey to assist in the relief efforts. Additionally, the Ukrainian Foreign Ministry received 27 requests from citizens who were unable to get in touch with their relatives in Turkey.

Later that day, Ukrainian foreign ministry spokesman Oleg Nikolenko reported that they had located six Ukrainian citizens who were safe and in satisfactory condition, but their houses were destroyed. They were currently living with Turkish relatives.

On February 7, 2023, President Volodymyr Zelenskyy issued a decree ordering the sending of humanitarian aid to Turkey to assist the country in overcoming the consequences of the earthquake.

=== Public opinion of the Russian invasion of Ukraine ===
The public opinion among Turkish citizens for providing weapons and military equipment to Ukraine has varied over the past years. According to the results of Eurobarometer's 2023 public opinion poll, 63% of Turkish citizens supported their country providing weapons and military equipment to support Ukraine against the invasion, and an additional 67% of Turkish citizens supported providing financial aid to Ukraine. However, in the same poll conducted in spring 2024, support for supplying weapons and military equipment to Ukraine has drastically fallen to 42%. As a result of the conflicts in the Middle East since 2023, particularly the Israeli invasion of the Gaza Strip, dissatisfaction in Turkey with Western support for Israel has increased. Both the Turkish government and the Turkish society have accused Western countries of applying “double standards” by not condemning Israel. The support rose again by 18% according to the latest poll conducted in spring 2025, where 60% of Turkish citizens support their country supplying weapons and military equipment to Ukraine.

== Resident diplomatic missions ==
- Turkey has an embassy in Kyiv and a consulate-general in Odesa.
- Ukraine has an embassy in Ankara and two consulates-general in Antalya and Istanbul.
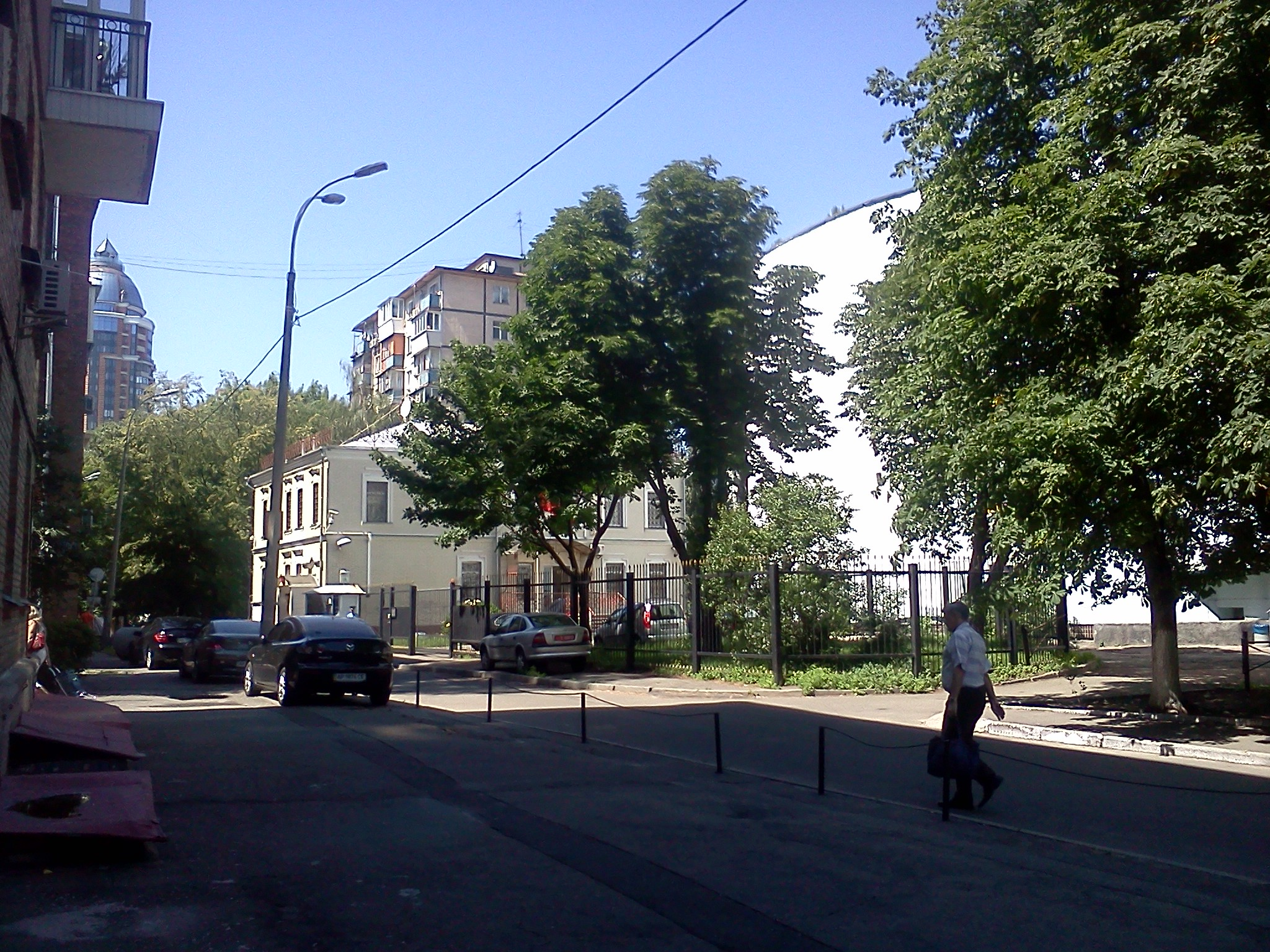
Embassy of Turkey in Kyiv

== See also ==
- Foreign relations of Turkey
- Foreign relations of Ukraine
- Ukraine–NATO relations
- Turks in Ukraine
- Ukrainians in Turkey
- Crimean Tatars
