= Mikheil Ukleba =

Georgian Ambassador (b 1953)

- მიხეილ უკლება
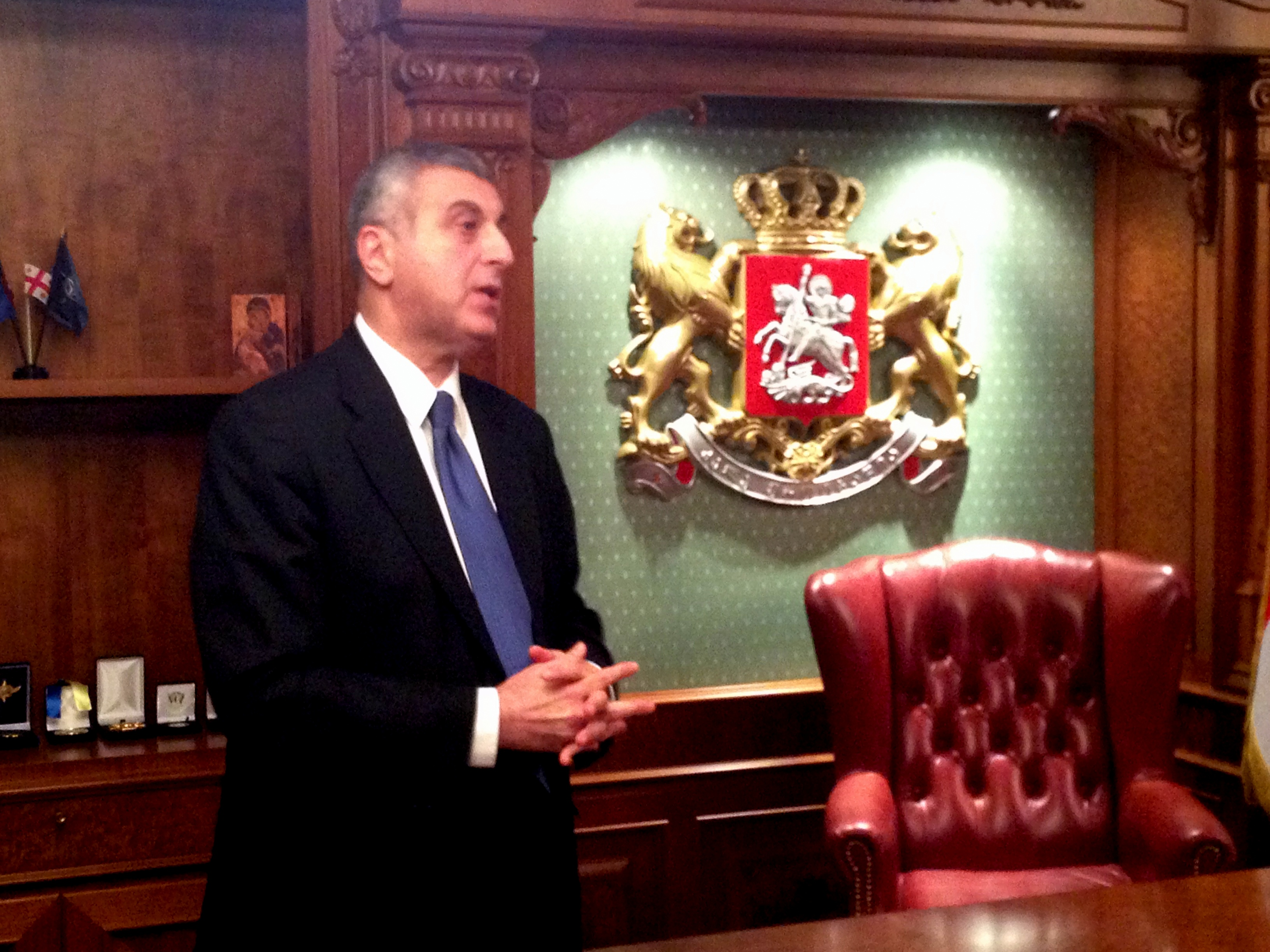
- Citizenship: Georgia
- Occupation: Politician
- Years active: 1989–present

Mikheil Ukleba (Georgian: მიხეილ უკლება]; born April 15, 1953) is a Georgian diplomat and politician.

He was the Minister of State Property of Georgia (1998–2001), until he transitioned to Ambassador-at-Large and became the Ambassador Extraordinary and Plenipotentiary of Georgia to the People's Republic of China (2004–2008), Ambassador Extraordinary and Plenipotentiary of Georgia to Bulgaria (2008–2008), Ambassador Extraordinary and Plenipotentiary of Georgia to Ukraine (2013–2017).

== Biography ==
=== 1990s ===
Ukleba entered the Georgian government in 1989. He served as a Senior Economist, Head of the Department of Foreign Affairs, and First Deputy Head of the Ministry of Foreign Affairs of Georgia.

In 1998, Ukleba became the Minister of State Property of Georgia.

=== 2000s ===
In 2005, Ukleba was appointed Georgia's first Ambassador Extraordinary and Plenipotentiary to the People's Republic of China.

In 2008, Ukleba was appointed as the Ambassador Extraordinary and Plenipotentiary of Georgia to Bulgaria. He was awarded the Order of the Stara Planina.

=== 2010s ===
In 2013, Ukleba served as Georgia's Ambassador Extraordinary and Plenipotentiary to Ukraine, serving until 2017. The period was marked by significant political and social upheaval during the Revolution of Dignity.

Since 2018, Ukleba has been serving at the Diplomatic Institute.
