= India and Russo-Ukrainian war (2022–present) =

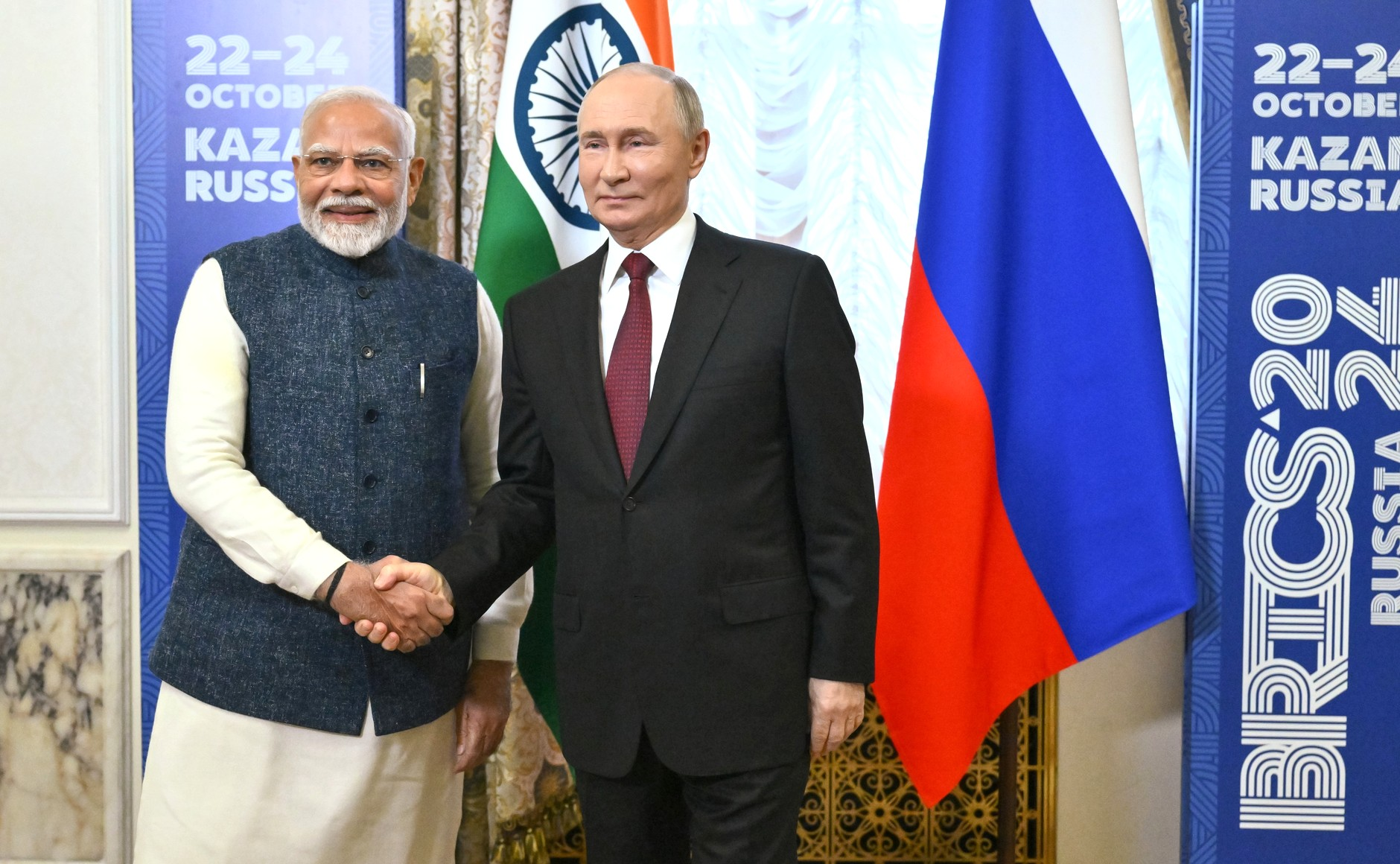
Russian President Vladimir Putin with Indian Prime Minister Narendra Modi at the 16th BRICS Summit on 22 October 2024.

India adopted a neutral stance since the beginning of the Russo-Ukrainian war in February 2022. On multiple occasions Prime Minister of India Narendra Modi has, with both Russia and Ukraine, called for the termination and peaceful resolution of the war. In July 2023, he said that India is not neutral, but rather on the side of peace.

Indian-Russian economic and diplomatic ties saw significant growth, occurring in contrast to Western condemnation of and sanctions on Russia. India's circumvention of Western sanctions to purchase heavily discounted Russian oil and fertilizer, its supply of dual-use technology to Russia, and its repeated abstentions from condemning Russia's war negatively impacted Ukrainian ties to India, complicated Western diplomatic interactions with India. However, India is still seen by many in the west to be a 'perfect' and impartial mediator.

India simultaneously expressed concern over the resulting humanitarian crisis and provided assistance to affected civilians while calling for the cessation of hostilities. The government highlighted Prime Minister Narendra Modi’s communications with both Ukrainian President Volodymyr Zelenskyy and Russian President Vladimir Putin, urging continued negotiations. During a 25 February 2022 Security Council meeting, India’s Permanent Representative, Ambassador T.S. Tirumurti, reiterated the importance of dialogue, condemned the abandonment of diplomacy, and explained that these principles informed India’s decision to abstain from the vote on condemnation of Russia and demanding withdrawal of forces.

As of August 2026, 58 Indians have died in the war; 51 died as support staff in the Russian armed forces.

== Operation Ganga ==
Operation Ganga was conducted with the aim of evacuating Indian nationals from Ukraine. It was conducted by the Ministry of External Affairs and Indian Armed Forces between 26 February 2022 – 11 March 2022. Utilizing the help of private carriers, about 23,000 Indian nationals were evacuated.

== Trade ==
After the start of the Russian invasion of Ukraine and because of international sanctions against Russia, Russia began selling oil and chemical fertilisers at discounted rate to India, increasing India-Russia bilateral trade volume from $13 billion [2021-2022] to $27 billion within 2022 and making Russia the largest oil and fertiliser supplier to India. During 2022–23, India became one of the largest trade partners of Russia, primarily through the purchase of Russian oil. In August 2024, India became the largest importer of Russian oil, overtaking China. India imported 35-40% of its oil from Russia in 2024, up from 3% in 2021.

In December 2023, India's External Affairs Minister S. Jaishankar met Putin and Foreign Minister Sergey Lavrov over a five-day visit, praising the two countries' "all-time high" trading volume, praising the trade as "balanced", "sustainable" and providing "fair market access".

On 12 December 2024, Russian state oil company Rosneft agreed to supply nearly 500,000 barrels of crude oil per day to Indian private refiner Reliance, the largest oil supply deal between the two countries in their trade history.

In July 2025, India became Ukraine's largest diesel supplier, providing 15.5% of imports—up from 1.9% a year earlier, according to NaftoRynok. Exports averaged 2,700 tonnes daily, routed mainly via Romania and Turkey. The fuel aided Ukraine and, according to Indian media, analysts suggest that some of it may have been refined from Russian-origin crude although the official sourcing data remained undisclosed. This occurred while the U.S. imposed tariffs on India over its Russian oil imports. In July 2025, the US announced its first "secondary tariff," targeting India to penalize its trade with Russia. Beginning 27 August 2025, Indian exports have faced an extra 25% tariff or a total baseline tariff of 50%.

In August 2025, US Treasury Secretary Scott Bessent accused India of profiting from reselling Russian oil, saying, "This is what I would call the Indian arbitrage — buying cheap Russian oil, reselling it as product. They’ve made $16 billion in excess profits — some of the richest families in India."

In August 2026, in the backdrop of Ukrainian attacks on Russian oil infrastructure and other shortages in fuel, Russia imported 70% of its oil products, including gasoline, from India. At the same time India was the second largest importer of crude oil and coal from Russia. Centre for Research on Energy and Clean Air reported a huge jump in imports as compared to previous terms.

=== Technology ===
In September 2024, it was revealed that the Russian Federation had been covertly purchasing components for its arms industry from India. In October 2022, the Russian Ministry of Industry and Trade, which is responsible for national defense production, developed confidential plans to spend about 82 billion rupees (about US$1 billion) on the purchase of critical electronic components through channels in India that were hidden from Western governments. Customs records indicated that India also supplied electronic equipment to the Russian Federation which including UAVs and components for radio-electronic systems.

In October 2024, it was published by Western media outlets that India has increased exports of critical sanctioned technologies to Russia, according to information from Bloomberg. The volume of Indian exports of goods subject to restrictions (including integrated circuits and machine tools) to Russia exceeded $60 million per month in April and May, twice as much as in previous months of 2024. In July, this amount reached $95 million, becoming the second-largest volume of such exports, surpassed only by China.

According to information from Bloomberg in October 2024, India played a key role as an intermediary in supplying Russia with powerful AI technologies, despite Western sanctions. The key suppliers included the Indian companies Shreya Life Sciences and Hayers Infotech Private Limited, and also included suppliers from Malaysia. Between April and August 2024, Shreya Life Sciences exported 1,111 Dell PowerEdge XE9680 servers with Nvidia processors designed for artificial intelligence to Russia. Russian company Main Chain, which was not under Western sanctions at the time of the transfers, was the recipient through which the high-tech products were distributed to Russia. The value of these deliveries was estimated at $300 million. In total, since February 2022, Shreya and Hayers had supplied Russia with high-tech products worth $434 million. Despite the exports falling under concurrent Western sanctions due to their potential for military use, India maintained active business with Russia due to it not joining United States and European Union sanctions against Moscow.

== Military ==
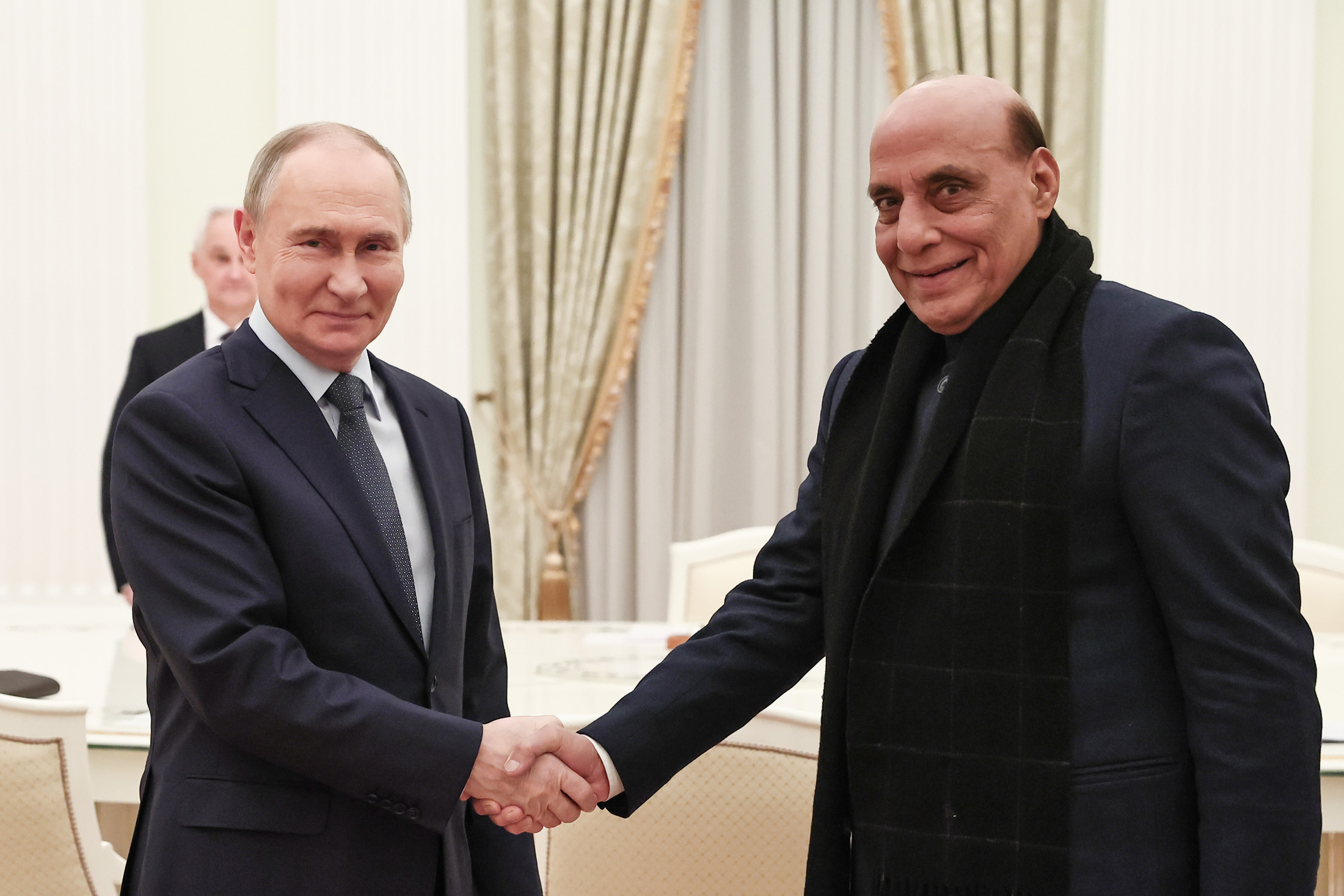
Vladimir Putin with Indian Defence Minister Rajnath Singh in Moscow, December 2024

=== Participation of Indian citizens in the invasion of Ukraine ===
On 8 March 2024, India announced the dismantling of a “vast human trafficking network” that promised young people jobs in Russia and lured them into its war against Ukraine. At least two men who had gone to Russia hoping to work as “helpers” in the army died on the front lines, their families said. The Indian embassy in Russia confirmed one of the deaths. Several others were also seriously injured. The criminal case states that some of the men were also offered admission to “dubious private universities” in the Russian Federation along with “free visa extensions at a discount.” It added that the Indian citizens were sent to the front lines “against their wishes”.

51 Indian citizens have been killed as members of the support staff of the Russian armed forces; 139 have been released after the Indian government intervened.

=== Military cooperation ===
In 2023, Russia and India planned to hold several joint military exercises in the Southern Military District as part of the Indra military project, which was first implemented back in 2003.

On 19 September 2024, it was announced that the Indian government planned to jointly modernize and export its fleet of T-72 tanks, which numbered about 2,500 vehicles, with Russia. The modernization of the vehicles will involve joint efforts by Indian defense manufacturers and Russian technology suppliers.

In October 2025, the countries jointly launched 15-day military drills "Indra 2025" in the Indian state of Rajasthan, near the city of Bikaner. According to the Russian embassy to India, around 250 Russian soldiers were sent to participate.

== India's position ==
Throughout the war, Ukrainian armed forces made use of Indian-produced munitions, including 125 mm tank rounds, mortar rounds, and 155 mm artillery shells. India also provided Ukraine with limited humanitarian and grant assistance. Indian-produced artillery shells reached Ukraine through European countries, including Italy and the Czech Republic, rather than through direct Indian transfers.

In September 2022, Prime Minister Narendra Modi conveyed to Russian President Vladimir Putin that the present moment was not a time for war.

In May 2023, newly elected Indian Prime Minister Narendra Modi met with Ukrainian President Volodymyr Zelenskyy on the sidelines of the G7 summit.

India participated in the June 2024 Swiss Peace Conference but declined to sign the concluding Communiqué, citing the absence of Russia from the negotiating table.

In August 2024, the Indian Prime Minister made his first visit to Ukraine in thirty years. Ahead of the trip, Modi stated his intention to discuss with President Volodymyr Zelenskyy both "the prospects for a peaceful settlement of the conflict in Ukraine" and "the deepening of Indo-Ukrainian friendship." During the visit, the leaders of both countries placed toys at the multimedia martyrology installation "Children" in Kyiv and observed a minute of silence in memory of Ukrainian children who perished in the war.

On 5 February 2026, the Indian Coast Guard intercepted three sanctioned tankers carrying Iranian crude oil, all of which belonged to the so-called "shadow fleet."

=== Neutrality ===
In July 2023, the Prime Minister of India Narendra Modi said "Some people say that we are neutral. But we are not neutral. We are on the side of peace." President Putin has stated that "Prime Minister [Modi] takes a neutral position but with an interest in the end of the conflict."

== Diplomacy ==
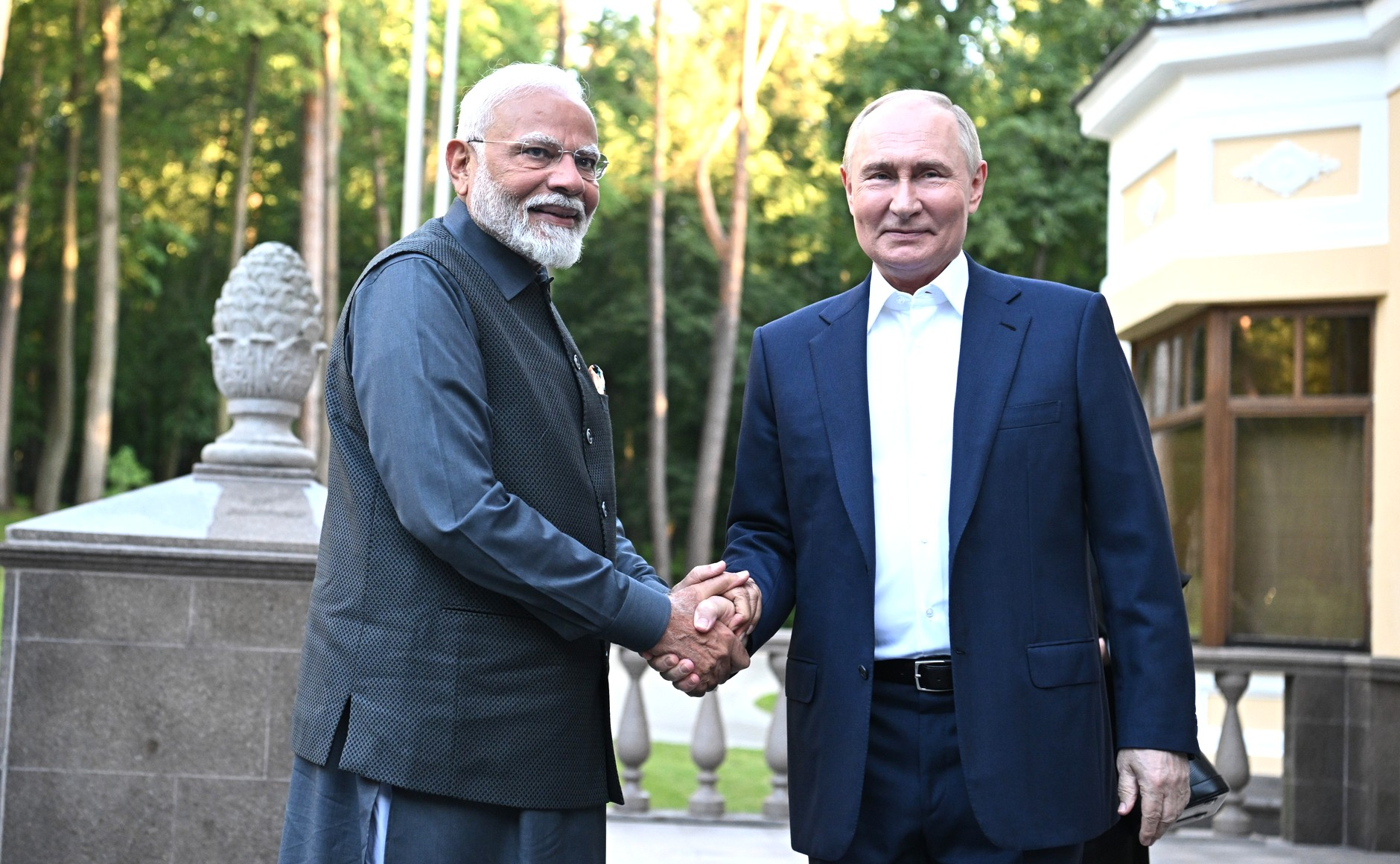
Modi and Putin in Russia on 8 July 2024

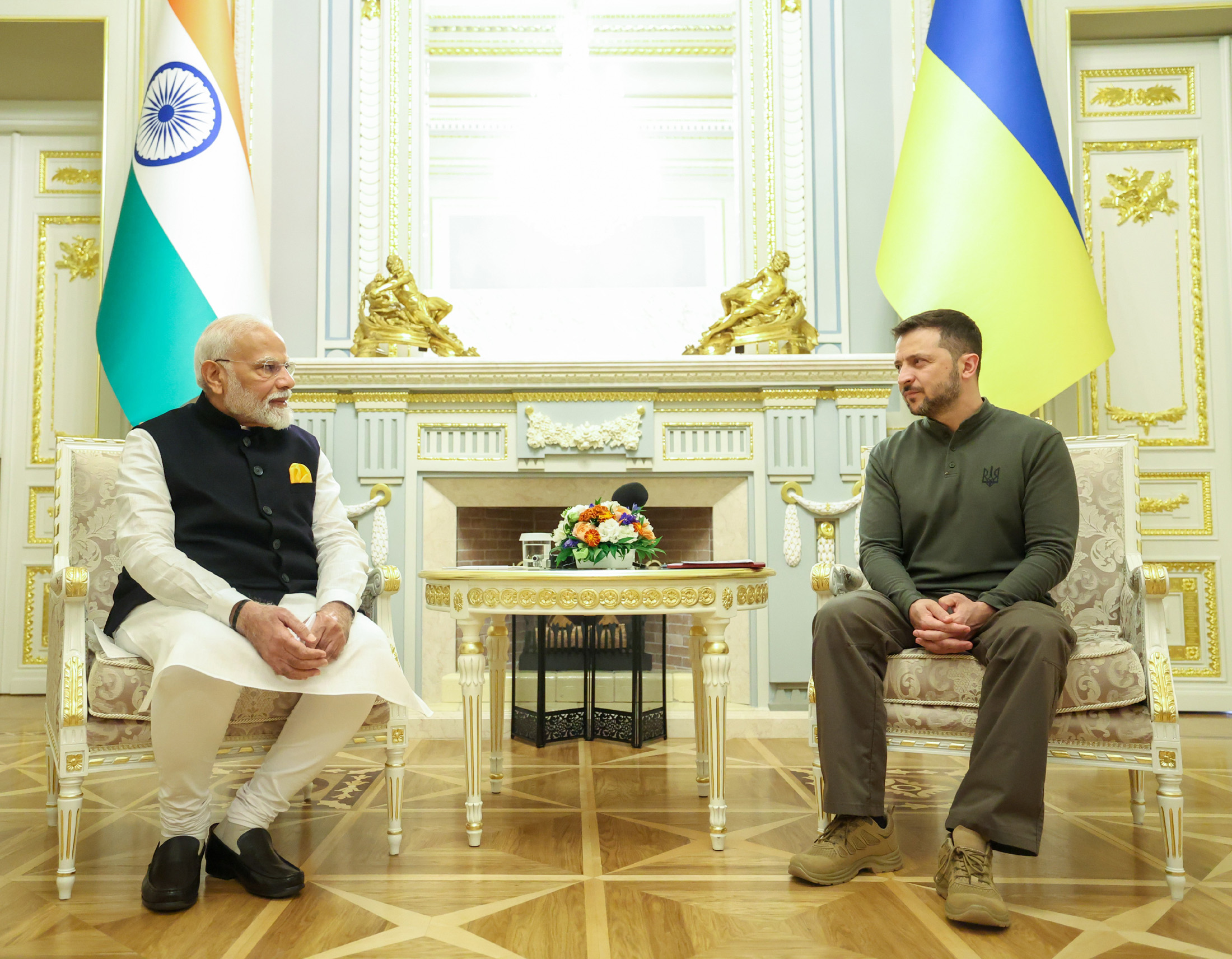
PM Modi meeting with President Zelenskyy in Kyiv on 23 August 2024

=== 2022 ===
On 16 September 2022, during a regional security summit in Uzbekistan, Prime Minister Narendra Modi told Vladimir Putin that "today's era is not an era of war," emphasizing global concerns over food, fertilizer, and fuel security. Modi reiterated India's position in favour of democracy, diplomacy, and dialogue as means to address international challenges.

=== 2023 ===
In July 2023, Indian civil servant Amitabh Kant, in the role of India's G20 Sherpa, stated that "the Russia-Ukraine war is not our creation, it is not a creation of developing and emerging countries, it is not a priority for us".

=== 2024 ===
In March 2024, the Indian government congratulated Vladimir Putin on his re-election in the 2024 Russian presidential election.

In June 2024, President Putin congratulated Narendra Modi on his re-election in the 2024 Indian general election in a telephone call, where both leaders expressed intent on further building upon the India-Russia Special & Privileged Strategic Partnership "in all areas".

In July 2024, Prime Minister Modi visited Moscow to meet Putin, his first visit to Russia in five years. The two embraced as Modi climbed out of his car; this act was criticized by Ukrainian president Volodymyr Zelenskyy as it happened on the same day that Russian missiles struck a children's hospital in Kyiv. During the visit, the two countries discussed nine strategic areas for closer economic cooperation, including nuclear energy and medicine, with a goal to significantly improve bilateral trade by 2030.

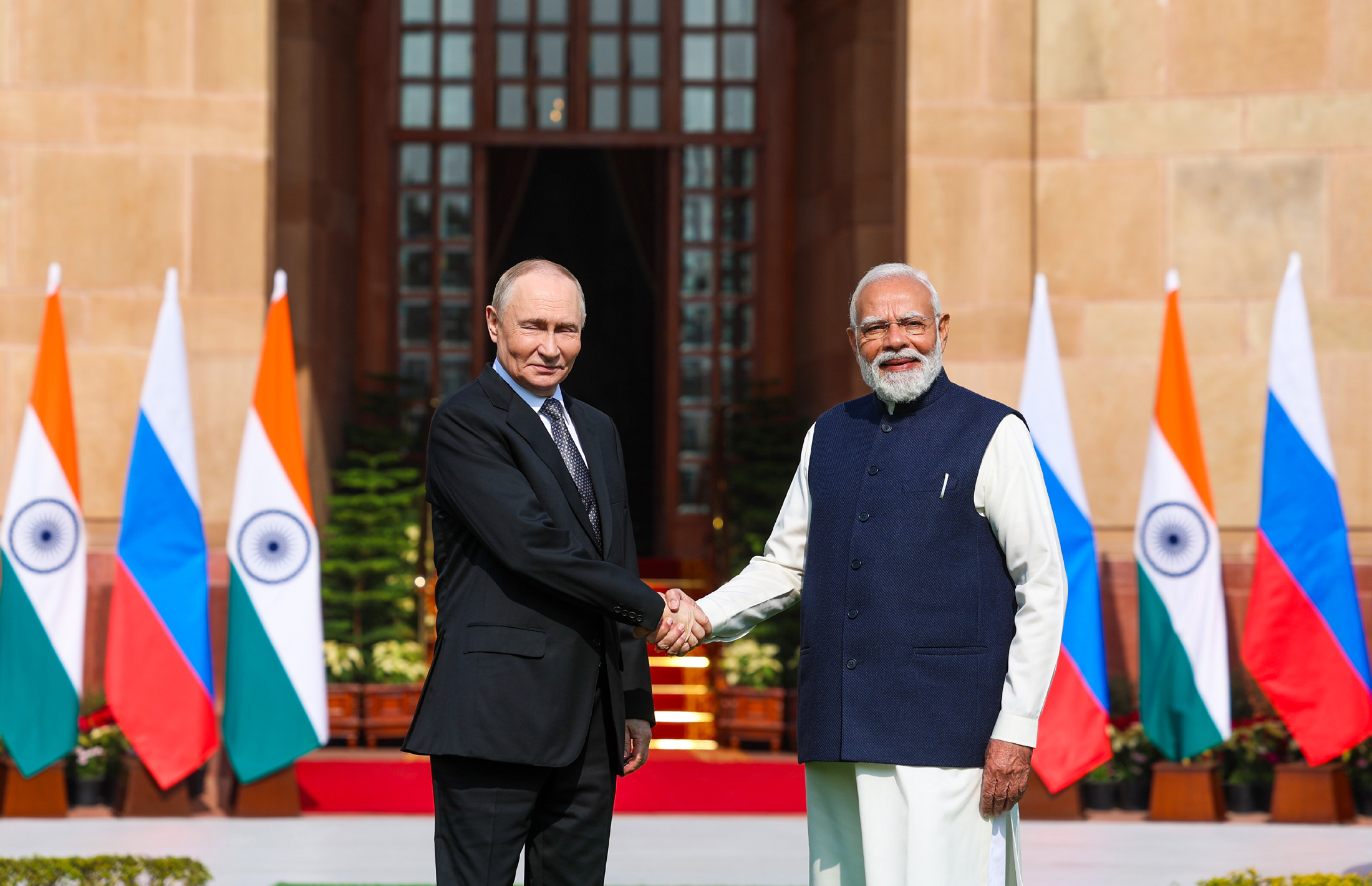
Putin and Modi in New Delhi during Putin's state visit to India, 5 December 2025

=== 2025 ===
In September 2025, US President Donald Trump called Modi to wish him a happy birthday, later praising him on X and thanking him for supporting efforts to end the Russia–Ukraine conflict. The following day, Modi held a separate phone conversation with Putin, during which he reiterated India’s full support for a peaceful resolution to the conflict, according to a statement from the Prime Minister’s Office.

At the Eightieth session of the United Nations General Assembly in September 2025, Indian External Affairs Minister S. Jaishankar commented on the conflict in Ukraine by stating that even countries not directly involved have felt its impact. He called on nations capable of engaging all sides to take a more active role in seeking solutions and reaffirmed that India supports any initiative aimed at ending hostilities and restoring peace.

=== 2026 ===
In August 2026, during a meeting with President Putin on the sidelines of the Shanghai Cooperation Organisation summit, PM Modi stated "we must move from endless wars to ending wars," without directly referencing Ukraine. In Kyiv, Indian External Affairs Minister S. Jaishankar said that India is ready to assist in any way possible to end the war in Ukraine.

Vladimir Putin, Narendra Modi and Chinese President Xi Jinping at the 18th BRICS summit in Bharat Mandapam, New Delhi, 12 September 2026

In September 2026, Modi and Putin met in New Delhi on the eve of the 18th BRICS summit. The two leaders discussed bilateral relations and the effects of the war in Ukraine on maritime trade, while reaffirming their countries' strategic partnership. India continued to import substantial quantities of Russian oil despite pressure from the United States to reduce such purchases. The 18th BRICS summit, held in New Delhi on 12–13 September 2026, attracted attention for its treatment of the Russian invasion of Ukraine. Unlike the 2024 Kazan and 2025 Rio de Janeiro declarations, the New Delhi Declaration made no specific reference to the war in Ukraine, despite addressing several other international conflicts and crises.

President Putin, speaking at the Moscow-based think tank Valdai Discussion Club in October 2026 said,

Prime Minister Narendra Modi is one of those world leaders who, despite our very good and even friendly relations, personal good relations, constantly raises the question and asks the question about putting an end to the conflict in Ukraine… He has an avid interest and very good ideas aimed at finding mutually acceptable solutions. In that sense, naturally, the Prime Minister takes a neutral position but with an interest in the end of the conflict. I think it’s my duty to say that directly. And we are thankful to the Prime Minister for his ideas… We are thankful for his desire to put an end to this conflict through peaceful means and as soon as possible.

In October 2026 it was revealed that India had submitted a peace proposal; Ukraine's Foreign Minister Andrii Sybiha said "We have four proposals. The most comprehensive is India's proposal. For the first time, India has signalled its willingness to play a role."

External Affairs Minister S. Jaishankar said at a Munich Security Conference meeting "We have been advocating it for many years, and in recent months we have got a little bit more involved beyond advocacy".

In November 2026, before the Ukraine-Russia-US talks in Abu Dhabi, President Zelenskyy posted on X after speaking to Prime Minister Modi that India was ready to mediate food corridors through the Black Sea. He also stated that Prime Minister Modi has called for the termination of the war more than once.

== Reactions ==
Ukrainian foreign minister Dmytro Kuleba criticized India for profiting from buying cheap Russian oil. On 29 December 2022, following the Russian strikes against Ukrainian infrastructure, Kuleba tweeted, "There can be no ‘neutrality’ in the face of such mass war crimes. Pretending to be ‘neutral’ equals taking Russia's side."

In March 2024, Dmytro Kuleba said on a visit to India that the country should be concerned about Russia’s deepening ties with China. He declared that “the co-operation between India and Russia is largely based on the Soviet legacy. But this is not the legacy that will be kept for centuries; it is a legacy that is evaporating.” Kuleba emphasized that Ukraine is interested in restoring trade with India and that Indian companies are welcome to participate in the recovery of the country.

In June 2024, Ukrainian president Volodymyr Zelenskyy criticized Narendra Modi's visit to Moscow to meet Vladimir Putin as a "huge disappointment and a devastating blow to peace efforts". In January 2025, The Guardian reported that India's continued technological trade with Russia was causing concern among Western allies, particularly due to the potential military applications of exported goods. A senior European Union official was quoted saying, “India’s position as a strategic partner is valued, but there is unease when this position results in undermining sanctions meant to curb Russian aggression.” Indian officials, however, reiterated that their foreign policy was guided by “strategic autonomy” and “national interest.”

In July 2025, U.S. President Donald Trump criticized India over its continued oil trade with Russia, despite ongoing Western sanctions. Announcing a 25% "reciprocal tariff" on Indian goods and additional penalties linked to India's purchase of Russian arms and energy, Trump also revealed a proposed trade and energy development agreement with Pakistan. These remarks and policy announcements were seen as a reaction to India's ongoing oil imports from Russia, which Trump suggested were indirectly funding the war in Ukraine. On 14 July 2025, Trump threatened to impose 100% tariffs and secondary sanctions on countries purchasing Russian oil if Russia did not agree to a ceasefire within 50 days. Earlier in July, U.S. Senator Lindsey Graham introduced a sanctions bill proposing tariffs of up to 500% on countries—including India—that continued to trade oil with Russia.

In August 2025, the House Foreign Affairs Committee Democrats criticized President Donald Trump's decision to impose 50% tariffs on India over India's trade with Russia, stating that the move threatened US-India relations. They argued that targeting India, rather than China or other major buyers of Russian oil, would hurt Americans and "sabotage" the US-India partnership. The committee had earlier stated that if Trump were serious about ending the conflict, he would have provided military support to Ukraine.

On 22 October 2025, the United States imposed sanctions on Russia's two largest oil producers, Rosneft and Lukoil, to curtail the financing of the war in Ukraine. These measures have significantly disrupted India's oil trade, leading to a sharp decline in imports from these specific entities. India has significantly increased its Russian oil imports since the start of the Russian invasion of Ukraine due to deep discounts, making Russia a top supplier.

Ukrainian analyst Viktor Kaspruk described India's shift away from its neutral stance as "hypocritical", particularly as Prime Minister Modi hosted Vladimir Putin for a state visit in December 2025.

On 19 December 2025, Ukraine’s Security Service (SBU) conducted a first-of-its-kind long-range drone strike on a "shadow fleet" oil tanker in the Mediterranean Sea, targeting a vessel that had recently delivered oil to India.

== See also ==
- India–Russia relations
- India–Ukraine relations
- Foreign involvement in the Russo-Ukrainian war (2022–present)
