= India–Indonesia relations =

- India: Indonesia

Diplomatic mission
- Embassy of Indonesia, New Delhi: Embassy of India, Jakarta

Envoy
- Chargé d'Affaires Yudho Sasongko: Ambassador Sandeep Chakravorty

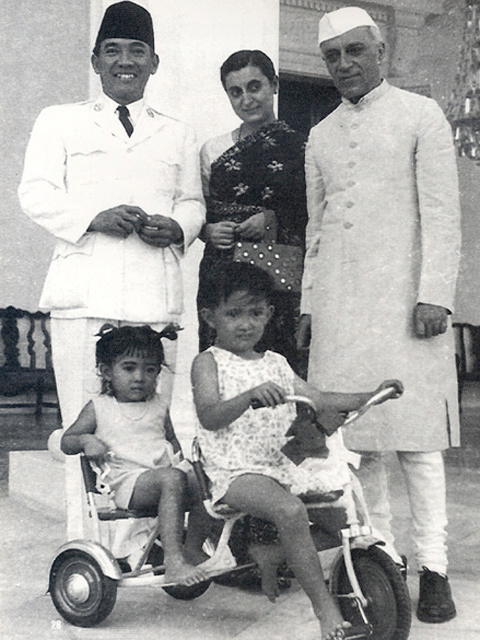
Sukarno and Jawaharlal Nehru, with Indira Gandhi, Megawati Sukarnoputri and Guntur Sukarnoputra. The relationship between India and Indonesia is warm and cordial since the beginning.

The Republic of India and the Republic of Indonesia established diplomatic relations on 16 April 1949. India recognized Indonesia's independence on 2 September 1946. Both countries are neighbours, as India's Andaman and Nicobar Islands share a maritime border with Indonesia along the Andaman Sea.

The Indian-Indonesian relationship stretches back for almost two millennia. In 1950, the first President of Indonesia, Sukarno, called upon the peoples of Indonesia and India to "intensify the cordial relations" that had existed between the two countries "for more than 1000 years" before they had been "disrupted" by colonial powers.

India has an embassy in Jakarta and Indonesia operates an embassy in Delhi. India regards Indonesia as a key member of ASEAN. Both nations had agreed to establish a strategic partnership. The two countries have significant bilateral trade.

India and Indonesia are among the largest democracies in the world. Both are member states of the G20, the E7 (countries), BRICS, the Non-Aligned Movement, and the United Nations.

== History ==
=== Antiquity ===
South Indian-origin rouletted ware at the site of Simberan, Bali has produced a carbon dating of 660 BCE (± 100). The population exchanges and intermarriages in the island of Bali between Indonesians and Indians has been archaeologically dated to the second century BCE.

The ties between Indonesia and India date back to the times of the Ramayana, "Yawadvipa" (Java) is mentioned in India's earliest epic, the Ramayana. Sugriva, the chief of Rama's army, dispatched his men to Yawadvipa, the island of Java, in search of Sita. Indians had visited Indonesia since ancient times, and ancient Indonesian (Austronesian people) embarked in maritime trade in the Southeast Asian seas and Indian Ocean. The ancient Indians spread Hinduism and many other aspects of Indian culture including Sanskrit and Brahmi Script. The trace of Indian influences is most evident in great numbers of Sanskrit loanwords in Indonesian languages.

The name Indonesia derives from the Latin Indus, meaning "India", and the Greek nesos, meaning "island" (due to the similarity of the culture in both regions). The name dates to the 18th century, far predating the formation of independent Indonesia. During the Srivijaya era, many Indonesians studied at Nalanda University in India.

Hinduism expansion in Asia, from its heartland in Indian subcontinent, to the rest of Asia, especially Southeast Asia, started circa 1st century marked with the establishment of early Hindu settlements and polities in Southeast Asia.

Indonesia entered its historical period after the adoption of Pallawa script and Sanskrit language from India as evidence in some of earliest inscriptions dated from Indonesia's oldest kingdoms such as the Yupa of Kutai, Tugu of Tarumanagara and historical records of Kalingga. Indianised Hindu-Buddhist kingdoms, such as Srivijaya, Medang, Sunda and Majapahit were the predominant governments in Indonesia, and lasted from 200 to the 16th century, with the last remaining being in Bali.

The Indian epics — the Ramayana and the Mahabharata — play an important role in Indonesian culture and history, and are popular amongst Indonesians to this day. In the open theatres of the Prambanan in Java, Javanese Muslims perform the Ramayana dance during full moon nights. An example of deep Hindu-Buddhist influence in Indonesian history is ninth century Borobudur and Prambanan temples. Even after the adoption of Islam, the link between two countries remained strong; not only because India has a significant population of Muslims herself. Indonesian Islamic architecture, especially in Sumatra, has been deeply influenced by Mughal architecture, evident in the Baiturrahman Grand Mosque in Aceh and Medan's Great Mosque.

Cultural admiration is not one-sided however, Indians also relate closely to Indonesian culture, especially Hindu Balinese culture. During his visit to Java and Bali in 1927, Rabindranath Tagore, an Indian poet, was so enamored to Bali and said "Wherever I go on the island, I see God". Then 23 years later in 1950, Pandit Jawaharlal Nehru hailed Bali as the "Morning of the World".

=== Post-independence era ===
India gained independence from Britain in 1947, while Indonesia, despite its independence, had to maintain its independence from the Netherlands. The British Empire assisted the Dutch, however, it departed from the Indonesian National Revolution by November 1946. About 600 Muslims in the Indian army defected to fight in favor of Indonesian fighters.

India defied the air blockade over Indonesia, imposed by the Dutch, during 1947 to 1949 and provided supplies and military equipment to the Indonesian freedom fighters. India also stopped Dutch from using their air space after July 1947. In 1948, India invited Indonesians to form a government-in-exile in India if needed.

In 1947, Nehru led international resistance by organising fifteen nation conference, including Australia, against the Dutch. It concluded the Dutch military action on Indonesia violated UN charter. Nehru also ordered a covert operation which involved Indian military rescuing prime minister Sutan Syahrir and Sukarno out of Indonesia. Biju Patnaik carried out this task. In 1964, Sukarno paid a tribute to Nehru on his death and recalled "the part he played in the struggle for Indonesia's independence".

India and Indonesia officially signed a treaty of friendship on 3 March 1951. In 1955, Indian Prime Minister Jawaharlal Nehru and Indonesian President Sukarno were among the five founders of the Non-Aligned Movement. Throughout history, relations between India and Indonesia have been warm. A maritime boundary agreement between the two countries in the Andaman Sea was signed in New Delhi on January 14, 1977.

President of Indonesia Sukarno was the first chief guest at the annual Republic Day parade of India in 1950. In the year 2011, President Susilo Bambang Yudhoyono was the chief guest for the same event.

== Strategic partnership ==
Historic Indian cultural influence: Indianized Hindu-Buddhist kingdoms within Greater India were spread across Indonesia (Srivijaya, Majapahit, Kalingga, Kutai, Singhasari, Tarumanagara and Pan Pan) and other parts of Southeast Asia (Champa, Dvaravati, Funan, Gangga Negara, Chenla, Langkasuka, and Pagan).

India and Indonesia, united by historic cultural ties, have signed strategic partnership agreement to enhance cooperation in the national and maritime security and safety, trade connectivity, infrastructure and economic development. India's southernmost territory of Andaman and Nicobar Islands lies close to Aceh province of Indonesia, an area which is an important global trade route.

In May 2018, "Shared Vision of Maritime Cooperation in the Indo Pacific" agreement was signed when Indian Prime Minister Narendra Modi visited Indonesia. Subsequently, Indian Navy and Indonesian Navy have been hosting bilateral "Samudra Shakti" naval exercise since November 2018 including in Java Sea and Andaman Sea.

These exercises are a significant enhancement of operational engagement between these two navies after their 2002 "Ind-Indo Corpat" agreement. India and Indonesia are also jointly developing Sabang Deep sea Port, and Indian naval ships have been regularly visiting this port after the signing of the agreement. Several Indian navy ships undertook naval exercises and visits to Indonesia e.g. a destroyer INS Rana in 2002, INS Sumitra in July 2018, INS VIJIT in 2019.

Between 6 and 9 July 2026, Narenda Modi undertook a state visit to Indonesia. He met with Indonesian President Prabowo Subianto. The two leaders signed 14 bilateral agreements dealing with critical minerals, agriculture and the procurement of Indian BrahMos supersonic cruise missiles and Astra air-to-air missiles.

== Economic relations ==
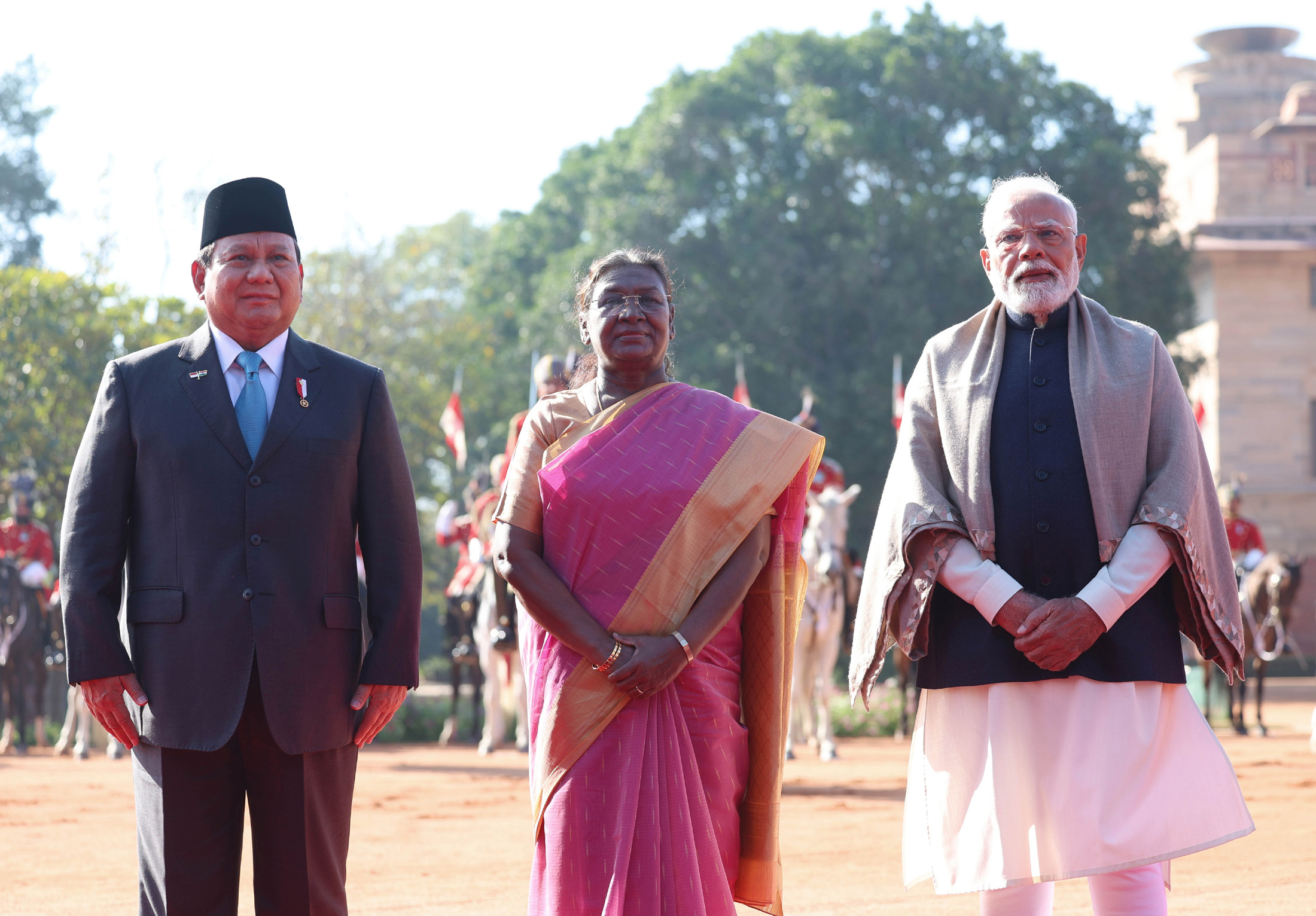
Indonesian President Prabowo Subianto with Indian Prime Minister Narendra Modi and President Droupadi Murmu as chief guest of Republic day celebration 2025

On 25 January 2011, after talks by Indian Prime Minister Manmohan Singh and visiting President of Indonesia Susilo Bambang Yudhoyono, India and Indonesia had signed business deals worth billions of dollars and set an ambitious target of doubling trade over the next five years.

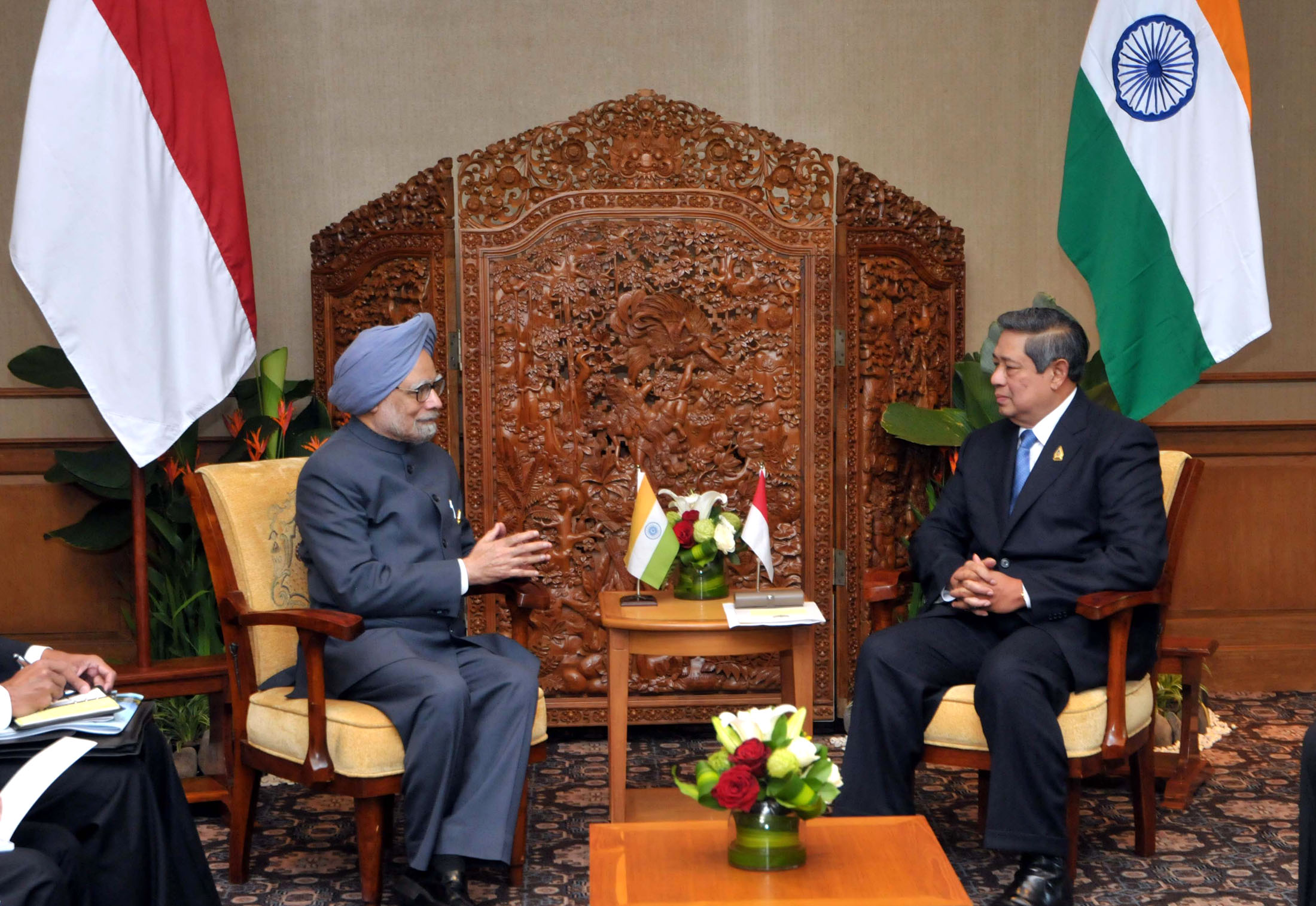
Yudhoyono with the Indian Prime Minister Manmohan Singh, on the sidelines of the 9th ASEAN-India Summit and the 6th East Asia Summit, in Bali, Indonesia.

Yudhoyono's Second United Indonesia Cabinet was announced in October 2009 after he was re-elected as president earlier in the year. The vice-president in Yudhoyono's second cabinet was Dr. Boediono. Boediono replaced Jusuf Kalla who was vice-president in the first Yudhoyono cabinet.

India also has further economic ties with Indonesia through its free trade agreement with ASEAN, of which Indonesia is a member. The two countries target to achieve bilateral trade of $25 billion by 2015, with cumulative Indian investments of $20 billion in Indonesia.

In 2025, economic relations between India and Indonesia strengthened through increased palm oil trade and agricultural cooperation. Following India's reduction of import tariffs, Indonesia projected that its palm oil exports to India would exceed 5 million tonnes, compared with 4.8 million tonnes in 2024. Indonesia also agreed to supply 100,000 germinated oil palm seeds in support of India's National Mission on Edible Oils–Oil Palm, which aims to expand oil palm cultivation to 1 million hectares by 2025–26. In addition, the Indonesian Palm Oil Council and the Indian Vegetable Oil Producers' Association signed a memorandum of understanding to promote institutional cooperation, address consumer concerns, and encourage the sustainable use of palm oil.

== Culture ==
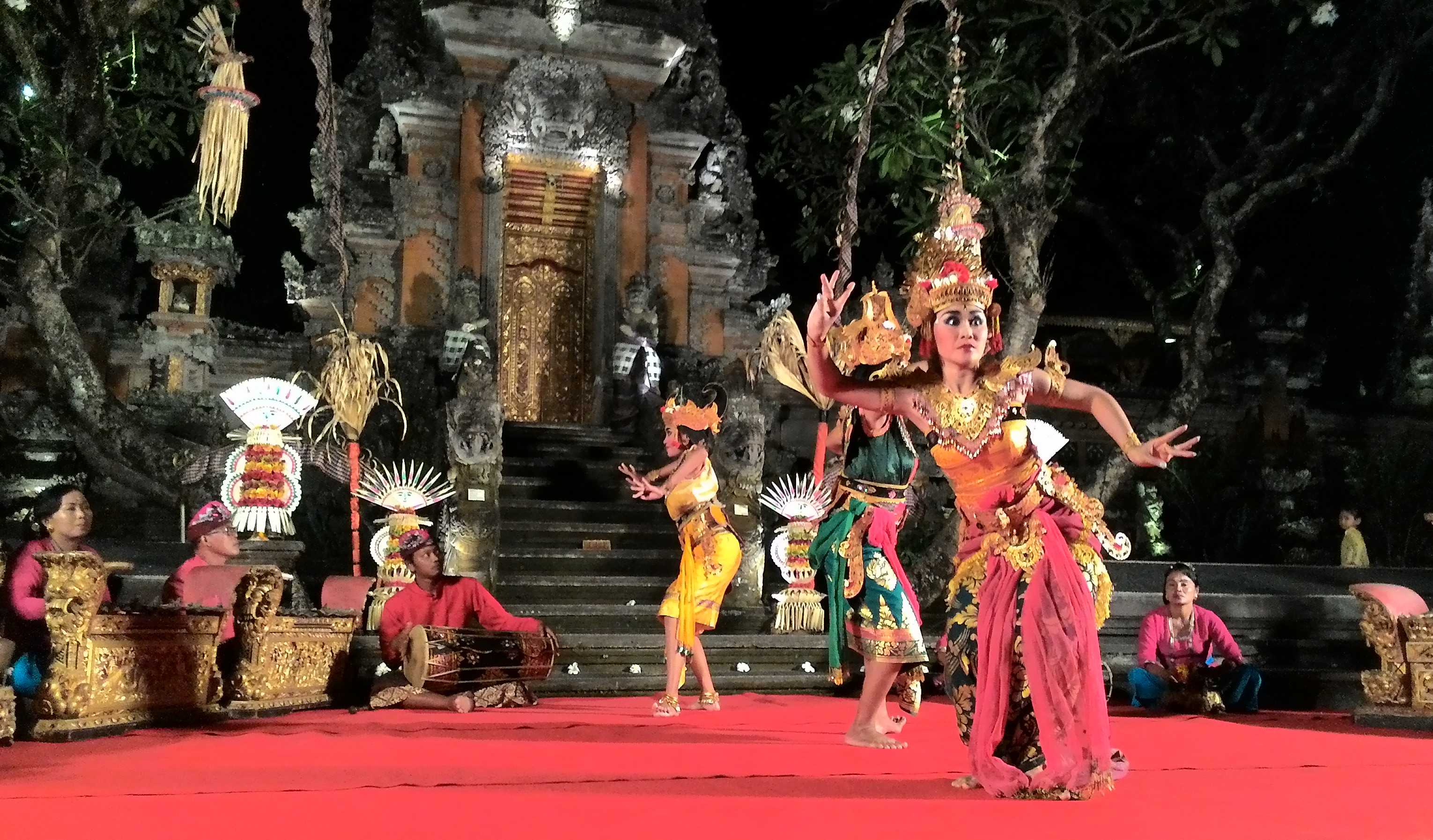
Balinese Ramayana dance drama, performed in Sarasvati Garden in Ubud.

Historically, the Indonesia was heavily influenced by the Dharmic religions of India. For example, Ramayana is a major theme in Indonesian dance drama traditions, especially in Java and Bali.

The cultural ties still continue, with popular Indonesian Dangdut music displaying the influence of Hindustani musics very popular within the people of Indonesia especially middle-class to lower-class people that enjoy the tabla-beat music. Bollywood films and music are also popular in Indonesia. To promote Indian culture in Indonesia, the Jawaharlal Nehru Indian Cultural Centre was established in Jakarta in 1989, featuring a library and providing lessons on Indian culture, as well as promoting art such as Yoga, Indian music and dance.

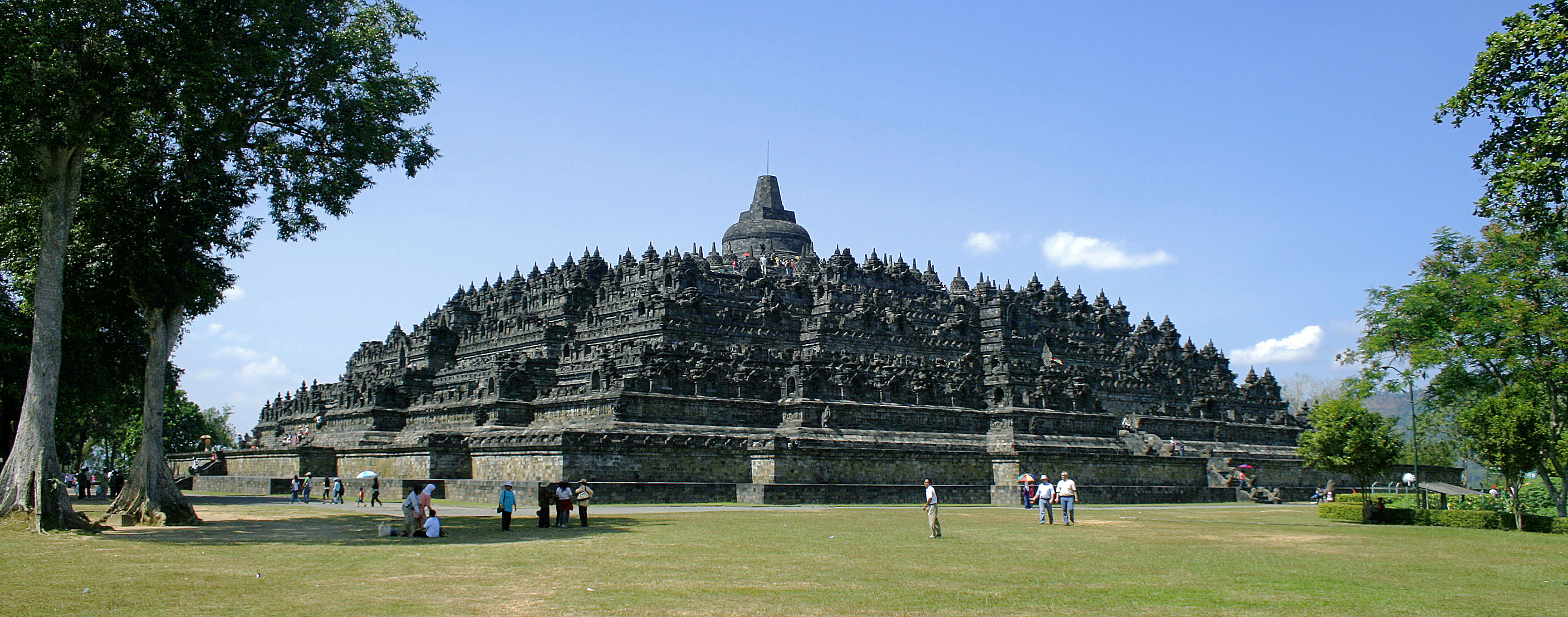
Borobudur, a Buddhist temple built by Sailendra dynasty, the temple's design in Gupta architecture reflects India's influence on the region.

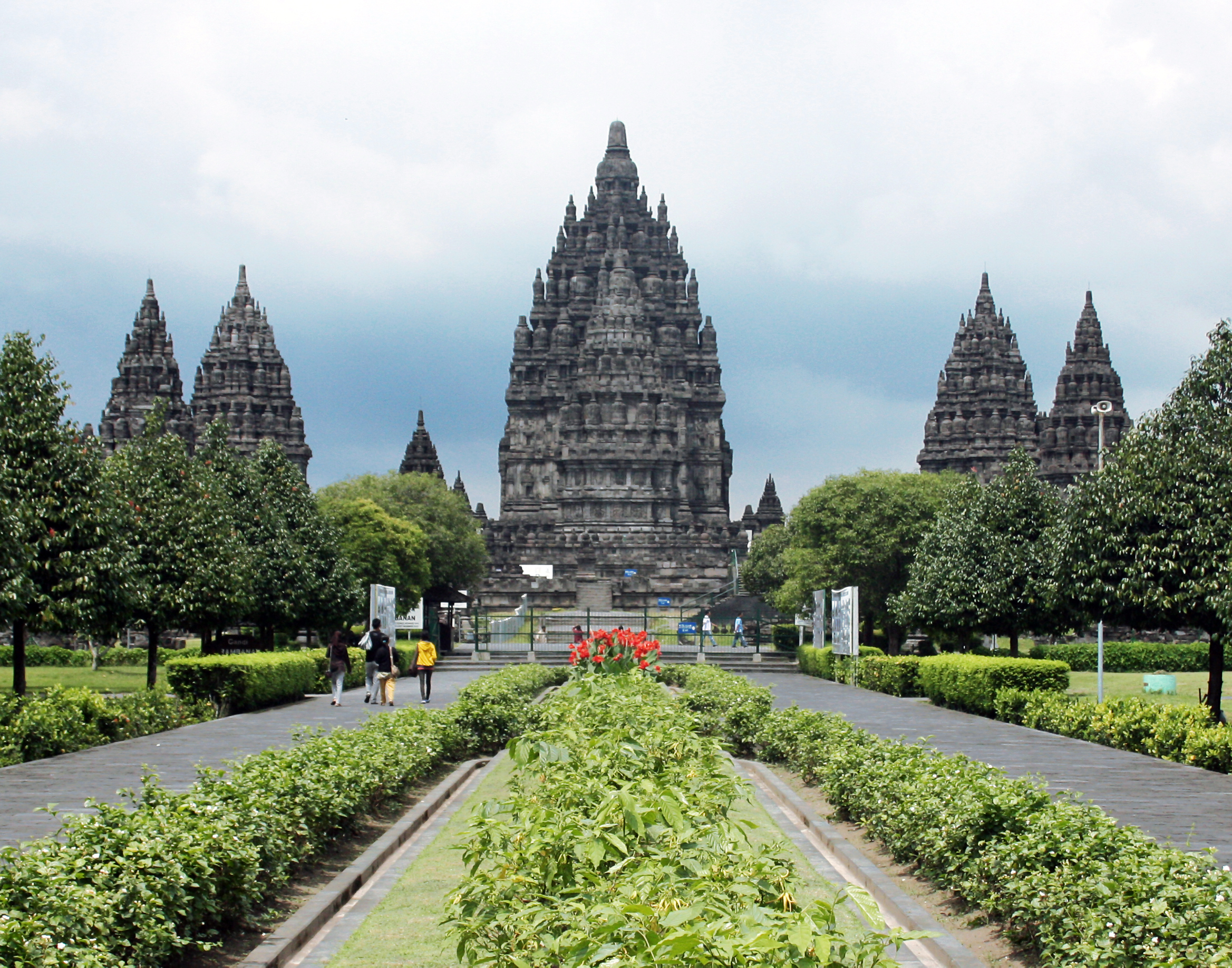
The Prambanan Temple of Central Java, reflecting Hindu architectural influences.

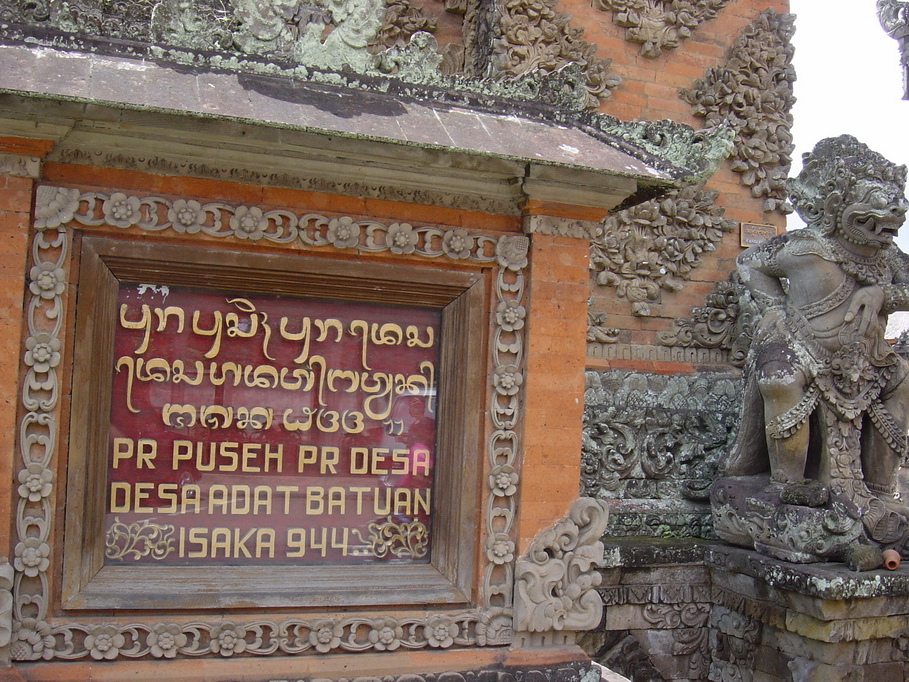
The Balinese script in a Hindu temple. India introduced the first form of writing to Indonesia, which evolved into the writing scripts still used in Bali and Java.

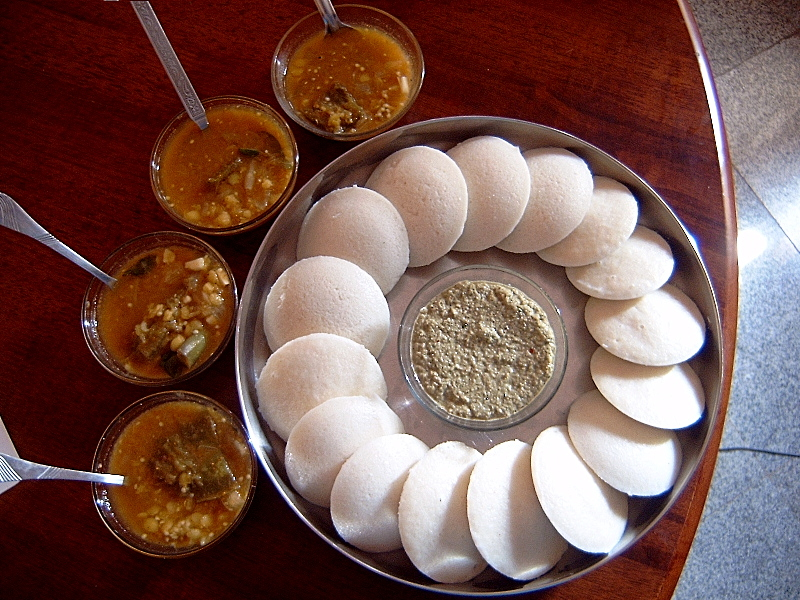
Idli, an Indian savoury cake from South India.

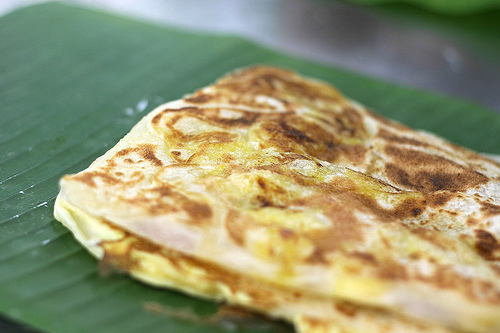
Roti canai, an Indian-influenced flatbread found in Indonesia.

== See also ==
- Foreign relations of India
- Foreign relations of Indonesia
- Delhi Republic Day parade
- Indian Indonesians
