= Oleksandr Polishchuk =

Diplomat from Ukraine

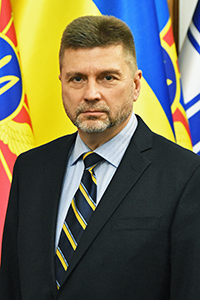

Ambassador of Ukraine in the Republic of India
- Incumbent
- Assumed office June 20, 2023

Deputy Minister of Defence of Ukraine
- In office October 23, 2019 – July 28, 2023

Personal details
- Occupation: Diplomat

Oleksandr Mykolayovych Polishchuk (Ukrainian: Олександр Миколайович Поліщук; born 1963, Novovolynsk) is a Ukrainian military officer and diplomat. He holds the rank of Major General (reserve) and was appointed as the Ambassador Extraordinary and Plenipotentiary of Ukraine to India on June 20, 2023. He previously served as Deputy Minister of Defence of Ukraine from 23 October 2019 to 28 July 2023.

== Biography ==
Polishchuk began his military career in 1980 as a cadet at the Kyiv Higher Combined Arms Command School and graduated in 1984. After in 1996 he graduated from the academy of the Armed Forces of Ukraine.

He served in various command and staff positions within the Armed Forces of Ukraine, the General Staff and the Ministry of Defence until 2010.

He has diplomatic experience, having served as the Deputy Military Representative of Ukraine to NATO from 2004 to 2007.

From June 2012 to July 2013, he worked in the National Security and Defense Council of Ukraine as a state expert. Between April 2014 and October 2017, he held leadership roles related to military security and defense policy.

From 23 October 2019 to 28 July 2023, he served as Deputy Minister of Defence of Ukraine.

He was a member of the Ukrainian delegation to the Trilateral Contact Group (2020–2022), serving as a representative in the security working subgroup.

Since 20 June 2023, he has been serving as Ambassador of Ukraine to the Republic of India.

== Diplomatic activities ==
Polishchuk was appointed by Ukrainian President Volodymyr Zelenskyy as the Ambassador of Ukraine to India on 20 June 2023.

He presented his credentials to the President of India, Droupadi Murmu, at a ceremony held at Rashtrapati Bhavan in New Delhi on 29 August 2023, alongside envoys from Estonia, Burkina Faso, and Norway.

In 2024, Polishchuk stated that Ukraine sought India's support in international peace efforts encouraging India to associate with the joint communique of the Switzerland Peace Summit. He highlighted bilateral cooperation, particularly in humanitarian assistance, including potential Indian support for energy infrastructure, demining efforts and medical rehabilitation initiatives in Ukraine.

== Awards ==
On the occasion of the Constitution Day of Ukraine he was awarded with 'Order of Danylo Halytskyi' for a significant personal contribution to state construction and significant labor achievements.

== See also ==
- Ukraine–India relations
- Ministry of Defence of Ukraine
