= List of ambassadors of India to Indonesia =

Ambassador of India to Indonesia
- Emblem of India

- Flag of India
- Incumbent; Sandeep Chakravorty since August 2023
- Style: His Excellency
- Type: Ambassador
- Member of: Indian Foreign Service
- Reports to: Ministry of External Affairs
- Appointer: President of India
- Term length: No fixed tenure
- Inaugural holder: Paramasiva Subbarayan
- Website: Indian Ambassador to Indonesia

The ambassador of India to Indonesia is the chief diplomatic representative of India to Indonesia, housed in the Indian Embassy located at Gama Tower, 28th floor, Jl. HR. Rasuna Said Kav. C22, Karet Kuningan, Setiabudi, Kota Jakarta Selatan, Jakarta 12940.

The embassy is headed by the Ambassador, while the consulates located in Denpasar and Medan are headed by a Consul.

The following people have served as Ambassadors to Indonesia.

== List of Indian Ambassadors ==
S. No.	Name	Entered office	Left office
1	Paramasiva Subbarayan	1949	1951
2	Alagappan	1952	1954
3	B. Tyabji	March 1954	July 1956
4	G. Parthasarthi	January 1957	June 1958
5	J. N. Khosla	November 1958	June 1961
6	A. B. Pant	October 1961	June 1964
7	P. Rantam	January 1965	June 1967
8	K. M. Kannampilly	July 1967	February 1970
9	N. B. Menon	August 1970	April 1973
10	M. Ahmed	May 1973	February 1977
11	B. C. Mishra	April 1977	May 1979
12	S. K. Bhutani	October 1979	February 1982
13	Gen. O. P. Malhotra	February 1982	November 1984
14	V. C. Khanna	February 1985	March 1988
15	R. S. Kalha	April 1988	February 1992
16	Vinay Verma	May 1992	February 1994
17	S. T. Devara	September 1994	January 1998
18	M. Venkatraman	July 1998	August 2001
19	Shyam Saran	August 2001	October 2002
20	Hemant Krishna Singh	February 2003	May 2006
21	Navrekha Sharma	June 2006	January 2008
22	Biren Nanda	April 2008	March 2012
23	Gurjit Singh	April 2012	December 2015
24	Nengcha Lhouvum	January 2016	May 2017
25	Pradeep Kumar Rawat	September 2017	December 2020
26	Manoj Kumar Bharti	January 2021	February 2023
27	Sandeep Chakravorty	August 2023	
