= Embassy of India, Kyiv =

Diplomatic mission of India to Ukraine

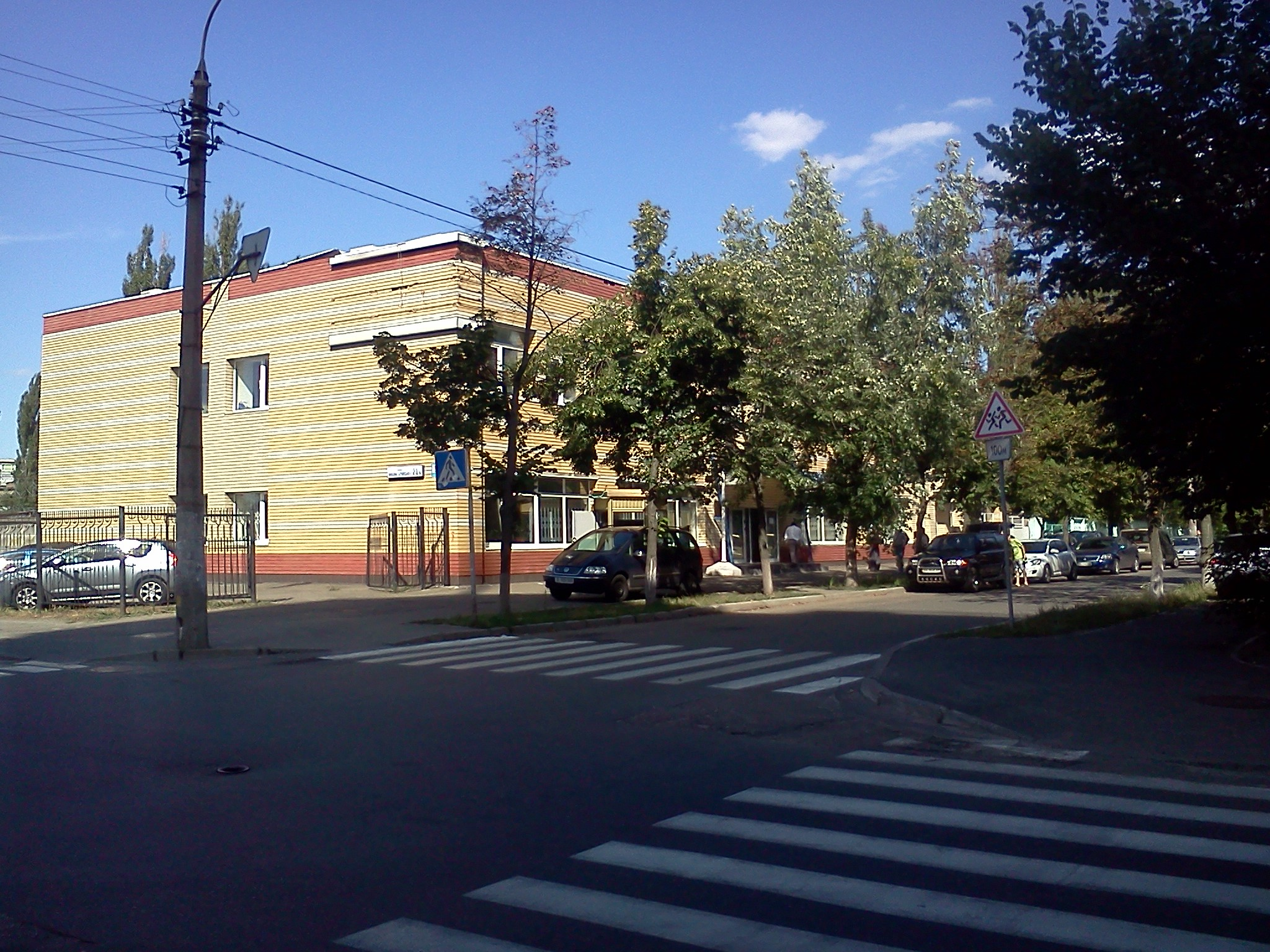
- Location: Kyiv, Ukraine
- Address: 20-B Maksym Berlynskyi Street, Kyiv 01901
- Ambassador: Anjani Kumar
- Jurisdiction: Ukraine
- Website: Official website

The Embassy of India in Kyiv is the diplomatic mission of the Republic of India to Ukraine. It is located at 20-B Maksym Berlynskyi Street in Kyiv. The embassy was opened in May 1992. The current Ambassador of India to Ukraine is Anjani Kumar.

== History ==
India recognised Ukraine's independence on 26 December 1991, and diplomatic relations between the two countries were established on 17 January 1992. The Embassy of India in Kyiv opened in May 1992. Sudhir Tukaram Devare served as India's first ambassador to independent Ukraine and was involved in establishing the new Indian diplomatic mission in Kyiv.

Following the beginning of the Russian invasion of Ukraine in February 2022, a significant part of the embassy was moved from Kyiv to Lviv as India carried out the evacuation of its nationals from Ukraine. On 13 March, the Government of India announced the temporary relocation of the embassy to Poland because of the deteriorating security situation in Ukraine. The embassy resumed operations in Kyiv on 17 May 2022.

== Consulate General in Odesa ==
India opened a consulate general in Odesa in 1962, when the city was part of the Ukrainian Soviet Socialist Republic. It continued to operate after Ukrainian independence and closed in March 1999. The consulate was located at 31 Kirova Street, now Bazarna Street.

During the Soviet period, the consulate provided assistance to Indian seafarers, including repatriation and payment-related issues.

Its closure was linked to declining economic and transport ties between India and Ukraine, including the discontinuation of the Odesa–Calcutta shipping line.

== Cultural and educational activities ==
The embassy carries out cultural diplomacy in Ukraine, including activities related to Indian dance, yoga, philosophy, literature and the promotion of the Hindi language. It has cooperated with Ukrainian universities and cultural organisations and has organised events connected with the International Day of Yoga and Indian cultural festivals.

The embassy also administers educational opportunities offered by the Government of India to Ukrainian nationals. These include scholarships of the Indian Council for Cultural Relations (ICCR) for study at Indian universities and training programmes under the Indian Technical and Economic Cooperation Programme (ITEC).

== Heads of mission ==
The following diplomats have served as heads of the Indian mission in Ukraine.

No.	Ambassador	Term
1	Sudhir Tukaram Devare	12 August 1992 - 22 July 1994
2	Rajendra Kumar Rai	25 March 1995 - 3 July 1997
3	Vidya Bhushan Soni	9 December 1997 - 31 May 2002
4	Shehkholen Kipgen	10 June 2002 - 28 June 2005
5	Debabrata Saha	11 September 2005 - 11 September 2010
6	Jyoti Swarup Pande	20 September 2010 - 31 May 2011
7	Rajiv Kumar Chander	28 July 2011 - 25 July 2015
8	Manoj Kumar Bharti	10 September 2015 - 12 October 2018
9	Partha Satpathy	14 October 2018 - 17 March 2022
10	Harsh Kumar Jain	5 April 2022 - 27 June 2024
11	Ravi Shankar	5 August 2024 - 27 May 2026
12	Anjani Kumar	2026 - present

== See also ==
- India–Ukraine relations
- Embassy of Ukraine, New Delhi
- Foreign relations of India
- Foreign relations of Ukraine
- List of diplomatic missions of India
- List of diplomatic missions in Ukraine
