= India–Ukraine relations =

- India: Ukraine

Diplomatic mission
- Embassy of India, Kyiv: Embassy of Ukraine, New Delhi

Envoy
- Ambassador to Ukraine, Ravi Shankar: Ambassador to India, Oleksandr Polishchuk

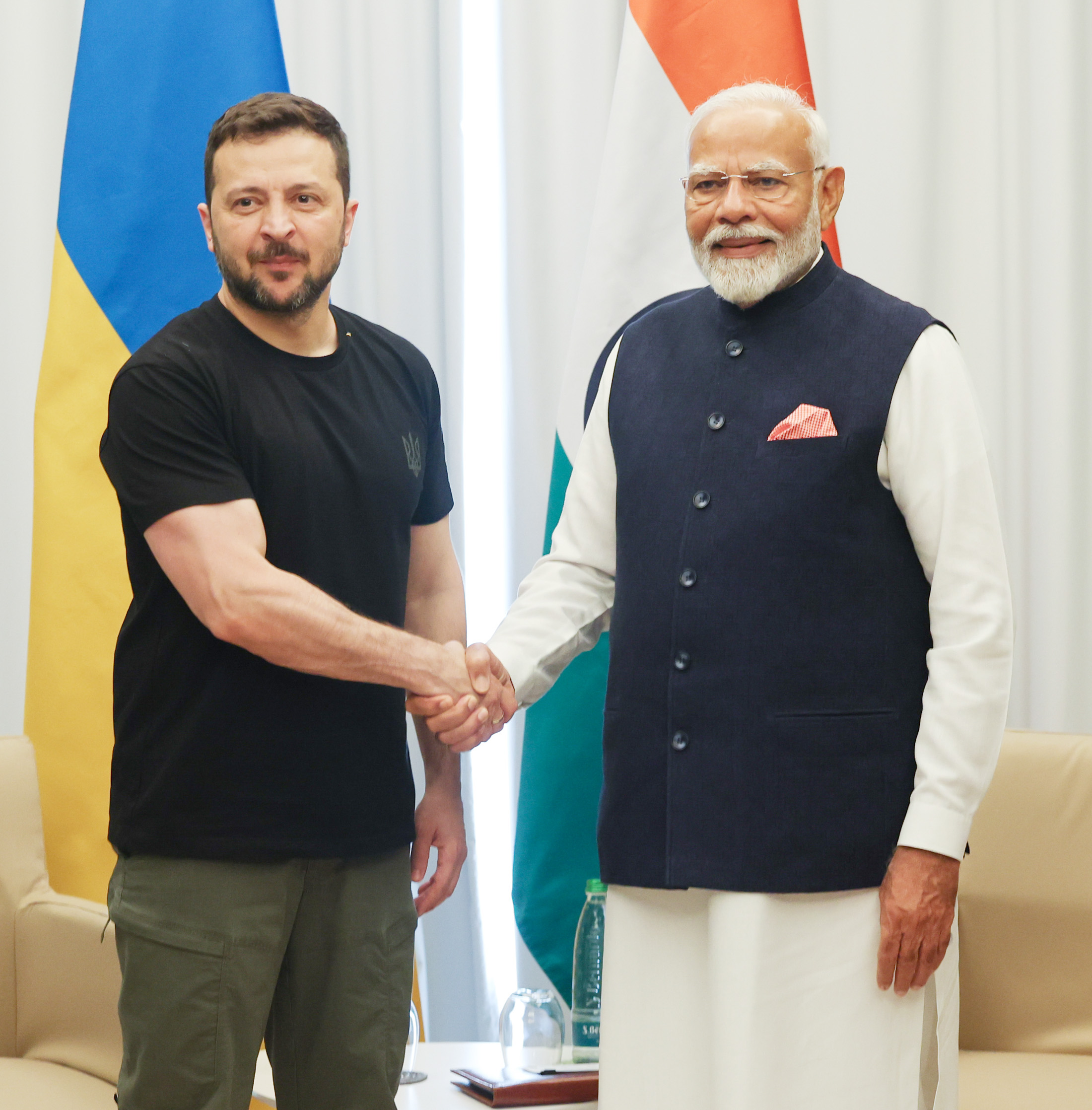
Ukrainian President Volodymyr Zelenskyy and Indian Prime Minister Narendra Modi at the G7 Summit in Italy, 14 June 2024

The Republic of India recognised Ukraine as a sovereign country in December 1991 following the dissolution of the Soviet Union and established diplomatic relations in January 1992. The Indian Embassy in Kyiv was opened in May 1992 and Ukraine opened its Mission in New Delhi in February 1993. The Consulate General of India in Odesa functioned from 1962 until its closure in March 1999.

== History ==
=== Bilateral treaties and agreements ===
More than 17 bilateral agreements have been signed between India and Ukraine, including agreements on cooperation in science and technology, foreign office consultation, cooperation in space research, avoidance of double taxation, and the promotion and protection of investments. During Aero India 2021, Ukraine signed four agreements worth ₹530 crore (equivalent to ₹649 crore or US$69 million in 2026) with India which includes the sale of new weapons as well as the maintenance and upgrades of existing ones in service with the Indian armed forces.

=== Trade relations ===
India-Ukraine trade relations and economic cooperation has developed on the basis of the long-standing friendship between the two countries. In March 1992 the Treaty on Friendship and Cooperation was signed between India and Ukraine, providing a major boost to India-Ukraine trade relations.

India-Ukraine trade relations have been developing at a very fast pace. There has been a threefold increase in India-Ukraine trade during 2003-2005, with the total volume exceeding $1 billion USD. Ukraine’s imports from India have doubled and stand at $3.214 million USD in 2006, while Ukraine’s exports to India have increased by 3.6 times and stands at $7.369 million USD in 2006. The total turnover in India-Ukraine trade during 2005-2006 has exceeded $3.1 billion USD (as of January 2014). The main items being imported by Ukraine from India are drugs, pharmaceutical production equipment, ores and minerals, tobacco products, tea, coffee, spices, silk and jute. The main items imported by India from Ukraine are chemicals, equipment, machines and engines. Bilateral trade between the two countries has grown significantly in the last 25 years. In 2018–19, it was almost $2.8 Billion USD. India is Ukraine's largest export destination in the Asia-Pacific region and its fifth largest overall export destination.

Both the Ukrainian and Indian governments take part in sessions of the Ukraine-India Inter-Governmental Commission which hosts the Joint Business Council Meeting of Ukraine-India. This has given a major boost to India Ukraine trade relations. Ukraine is not a new member in the Indian industry as its enterprises are actively involved and form the backbone of Indian power sector and heavy industries among others.

There are joint stock companies such as 'Ukrindustry' that has won contracts for conducting coke battery reconstruction at the plants of metallurgy in Rourkela and Bokaro. There are also Azovmash and Novokramatorskyi machine building plants that supply oxygen converter manufacturing equipment. India-Ukraine trade relations have also been successful in increasing co-operation between the two countries in the technology and scientific fields.

=== Science and technology relations ===
Under the Agreement signed between India and Ukraine in May 1992, the Joint S&T Committee meets annually to discuss implementation of projects, holding of exhibitions and co-operation in scientific research. The Committee last met in Kyiv in October 2007 and approved 11 S&T projects for implementation. Days of Ukrainian Science and Technology were held in New Delhi in December 2004. National Space Agency of Ukraine and ISRO have ongoing co-operation in the space sector. Ukraine has a very strong IT Sector. Many offshore call centres have been successful. Aptech Limited from Mumbai has signed an Agreement in May 2004 with International Institute of Personnel Management (the biggest IT training centre in Ukraine) to organise IT programmes for schools and institutions in Ukraine. Bio-technology is the latest sector where companies such as Biocon, Genome etc. are co-operating with each other. It also supplies turbines for thermal, hydroelectric and nuclear power plants.

In 2005, then President A. P. J. Abdul Kalam expressed interest in strengthening co-operation with Ukraine in the field of space research during a speech given to Indians in Ukraine. He and members of the Indian Space Research Organisation (ISRO) later visited the Ukrainian space agency Yuzhnoye, one of the largest rocket manufacturing units in the world.

== Political relations ==
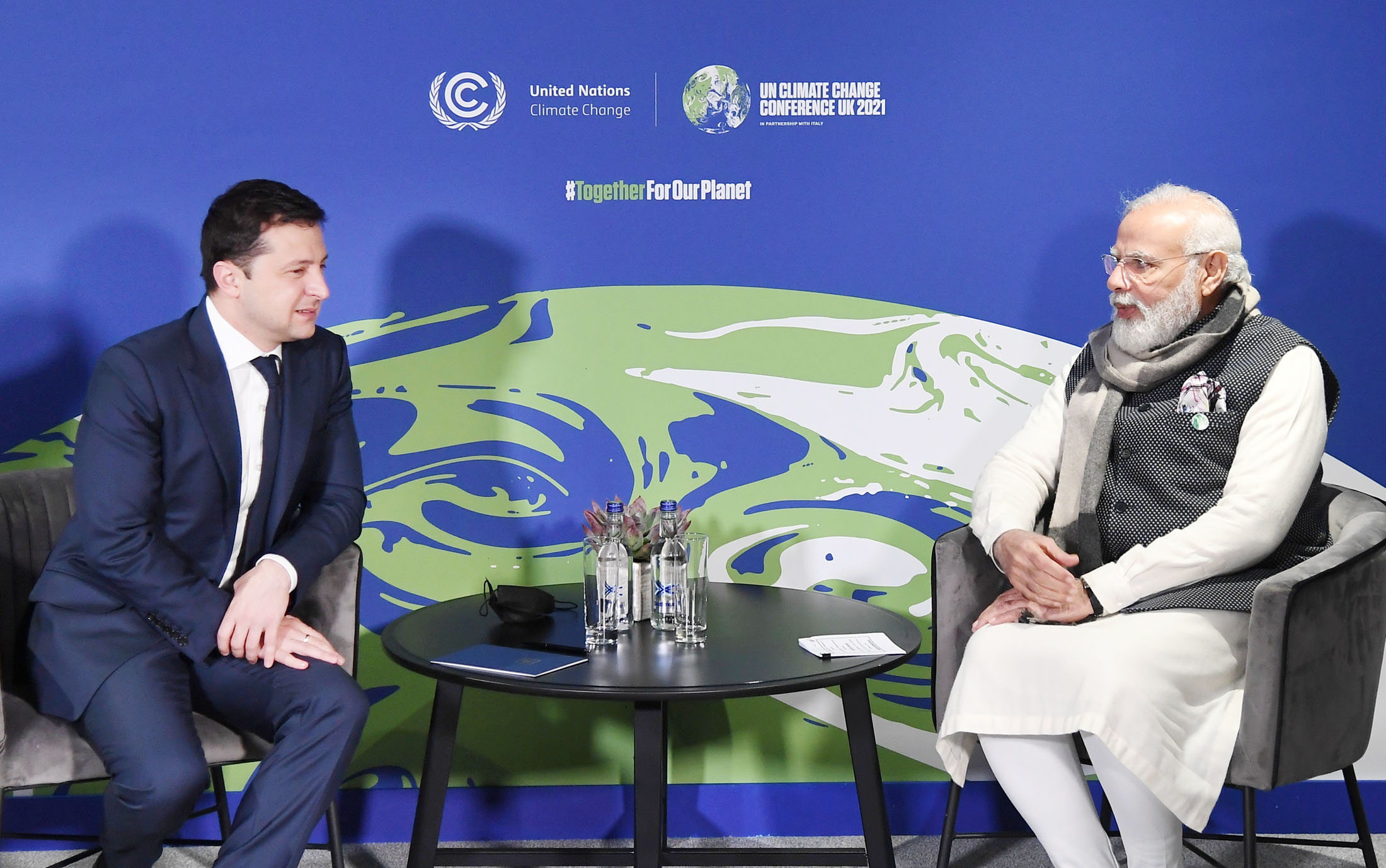
Indian Prime Minister Narendra Modi meeting the Ukrainian President Volodymyr Zelenskyy at COP26 in Glasgow, Scotland UK on 2 November 2021.

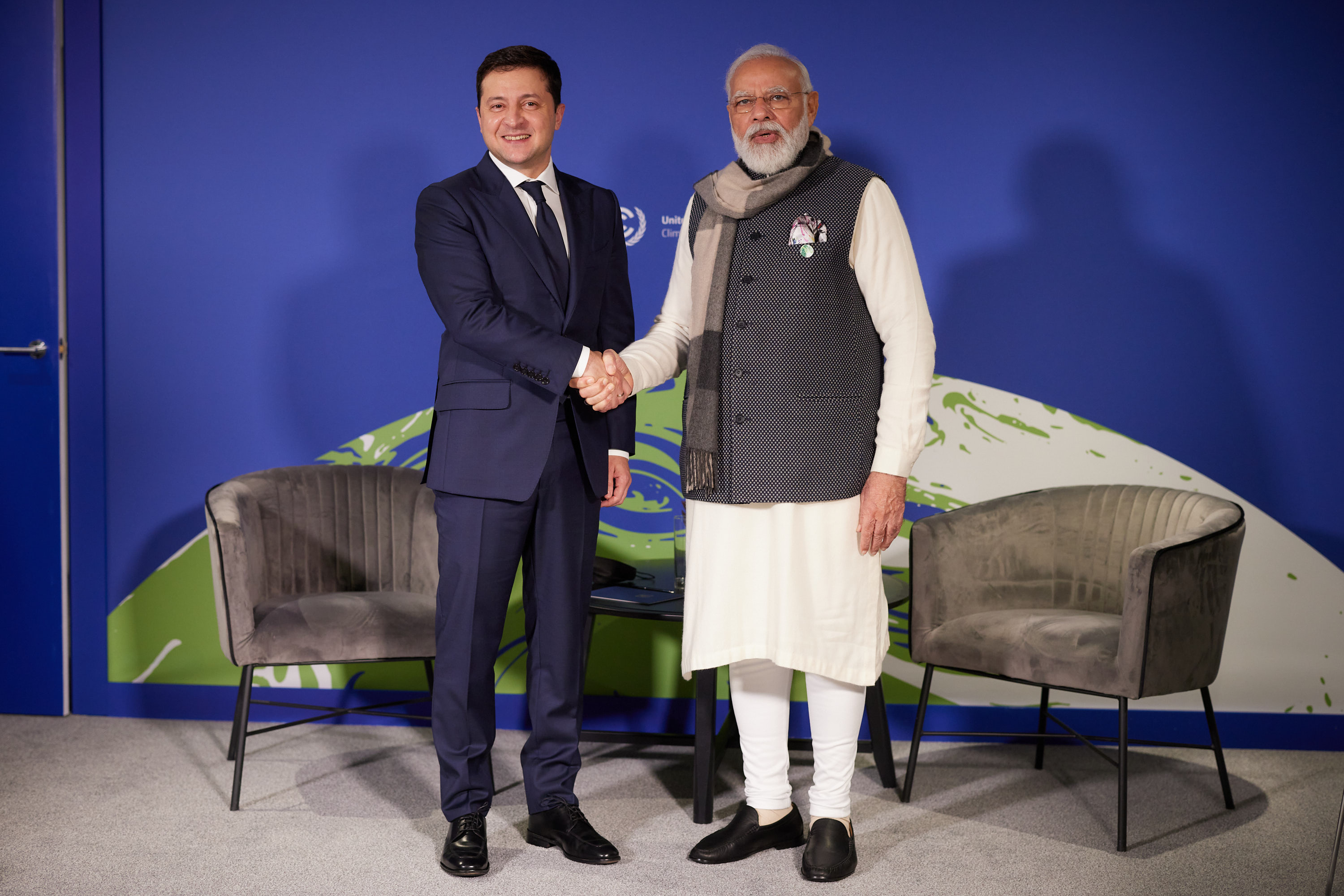
Prime Minister of India, Narendra Modi shaking hands with President of Ukraine, Volodymyr Zelenskyy on the sidelines of COP26 Summit in Glasgow, Scotland on 2 November 2021.

India has had friendly relations with Ukraine even when the latter was a republic part of the Soviet Union. Annual Foreign Office consultations are held at Secretary level. The Deputy Foreign Minister in charge of the Asia region represents the Ukrainian side in these consultations. Ukraine has been positively co-operating with India at the international level also. Ukraine supports the resolution of the issue of Jammu & Kashmir on the basis of bilateral Simla agreement by India and Pakistan. Ukraine also supports reforms of the UN structure.

The Permanent Representative of Ukraine to the United Nations, Volodymyr Yelchenko, condemned India for testing nuclear weapons in a statement.

=== Position on Crimea ===
After the Russian annexation of Crimea in 2014, India abstained from a resolution condemning it. India also does not support international sanctions against Russia. In December 2014, Prime Minister of Crimea, Sergey Aksyonov, made an unofficial visit to India to sign a memorandum with a business group called the Indian-Crimean Partnership. India's Ministry of External Affairs spokesman said that he was not officially aware of the visit by Mr. Aksyonov. The spokesman also said that Mr. Aksyonov was not a member of Putin's delegation. However, some experts have expressed scepticism regarding the explanation offered by India's Ministry of External Affairs spokesman. Ukraine president criticised India for allowing Sergey Aksyonov to visit India. U.S. State Department spokeswoman, Jen Psaki, also expressed concerns regarding the visit.

In November 2020, India, along with 22 other countries, voted against a Ukraine-sponsored resolution in the United Nations condemning alleged human rights violations by Russia in Crimea.

== Position on 2022 Russian invasion of Ukraine ==
India's position on the Russo-Ukrainian war, as stated in its parliamentary responses and at the United Nations, called for an immediate cessation of hostilities and a peaceful resolution through diplomacy and direct dialogue. India expressed concern over the humanitarian crisis and provided assistance to civilians, while maintaining a neutral stance emphasizing respect for international law, the UN Charter, and state sovereignty. During the 25 February 2022 Security Council meeting, Ambassador T. S. Tirumurti highlighted the importance of dialogue, regretted the abandonment of diplomacy, and explained that these principles guided India’s decision to abstain from the vote condemning Russia and demanding its withdrawal.

Throughout the Russian invasion of Ukraine, India abstained from voting in support of several resolutions aimed at condemning Russia's actions in Ukraine, both at the United Nations General Assembly and at the United Nations Security Council. India was one of three countries on the UN Security Council to abstain from voting on the resolution to condemn the 2022 Russian invasion of Ukraine, which ultimately failed due to a veto from permanent member Russia. India has also abstained from voting in support of resolutions demanding probe into Russia's human right violations in Ukraine and the resolution aimed at terminating Russia's membership to United Nations Human Rights Council. Russia, in turn, has also praised India from abstaining on resolutions aimed at Russia and termed India's position as "balanced and independent".

The Government of India had also refused to condemn Russia's invasion of Ukraine and termed India-Russia friendship "unbreakable". Following the invasion of Ukraine, India doubled down on buying large amounts of Russian oil at discounted price and continued placing orders for Russian-made weapons. This made Russia the 3rd largest oil supplier to India in 2022. In 2021, Russia was at the 17th spot, supplying only about 1 percent of India's overall oil imports. From April 2022 to January 2023, India's Russian import rose by 384%, mainly driven by increased import of Russian oil. Ukrainian Foreign Minister Dmytro Kuleba criticized India for profiting from buying cheap Russian oil. On 29 December 2022, following the Russian strikes against Ukrainian infrastructure, Kuleba tweeted, "There can be no ‘neutrality’ in the face of such mass war crimes. Pretending to be 'neutral' equals taking Russia's side." The Indian government has provided a significant amount of non-violent and humanitarian aid to Ukraine including essential medicines, essential medical equipment and school buses, emphasising on its de-hyphenated policy.

In March 2024, Dmytro Kuleba said on a visit to India that the country should be concerned about Russia’s deepening ties with China. He declared that "the co-operation between India and Russia is largely based on the Soviet legacy. But this is not the legacy that will be kept for centuries; it is a legacy that is evaporating." Kuleba emphasized that Ukraine is interested in restoring trade with India and that Indian companies are welcome to participate in the recovery of the country.

In June 2024, Indian diplomat Pavan Kapoor attended the Ukraine peace summit in Switzerland. Kapoor did not sign the Joint Communiqué.

In July 2024, Indian Prime Minister Narendra Modi visited Moscow to meet Russian President Vladimir Putin. Ukrainian President Volodymyr Zelenskyy criticized Narendra Modi's visit to Moscow as a "huge disappointment and a devastating blow to peace efforts". The two embraced as Modi climbed out of his car; this act was criticized by Zelenskyy as it happened on the same day that Russian missiles struck a children's hospital in Kyiv.

In August 2024, Modi visited Ukraine, marking his first visit to Ukraine by any Indian Prime Minister.

In August 2025, PM Modi invited Volodymyr Zelenskyy to visit India.

In July 2025, India became Ukraine’s largest diesel supplier, providing 15.5% of total imports—up from just 1.9% in July 2024, according to NaftoRynok. Exports averaged 2,700 tonnes per day, with deliveries routed via Romania’s Danube ports and Turkey’s Opet terminal. The increased supply supported Ukraine’s fuel needs and analysts noted that some diesel may have been refined from Russian-origin crude, though official data remained unconfirmed. The fuel aided Kyiv even while the U.S. imposed punitive tariffs on India over its continued imports of Russian oil.

In 2025, several top U.S. officials and political figures have accused India of effectively financing Russia’s war in Ukraine by serving as a major buyer of Russian energy. In late 2025, the United States, European Union, and United Kingdom significantly escalated sanctions against Russia's two largest oil producers, Rosneft and Lukoil, to curtail the financing of the war in Ukraine. India has significantly increased its Russian oil imports since the start of the Russian invasion of Ukraine due to deep discounts, making Russia a top supplier.

Ukrainian analyst Viktor Kaspruk described India's shift away from its neutral stance as "hypocritical", particularly as Prime Minister Modi hosted Vladimir Putin for a state visit in December 2025.

On 19 December 2025, Ukraine’s Security Service (SBU) conducted a first-of-its-kind long-range drone strike on a "shadow fleet" oil tanker in the Mediterranean Sea, targeting a vessel that had recently delivered oil to India.

On 9 November 2026, Volodymyr Zelenskyy held a telephone conversation with Narendra Modi ahead of planned talks between Ukraine, Russia and the United States in Abu Dhabi. According to Zelenskyy, India expressed its willingness to mediate efforts to establish corridors for Ukrainian grain exports through the Black Sea, which had been disrupted by Russian attacks. Modi's office reaffirmed India's readiness to contribute to efforts aimed at a peaceful resolution of the conflict.

=== Scandals ===
The Ukraine Defense Ministry’s official Twitter account posted a caricature image mocking the Hindu deity Kali and called it a "work of art". Following subsequent backlash, Ukraine’s Deputy Foreign Minister Emine Dzheppar Dzhaparova tweeted "We regret @DefenceU (Ukraine Defense Ministry’s official Twitter account) depicting Hindu Goddess Kali in a distorted manner."

=== Sanctions ===
Oleksandr Merezhko, a senior Ukrainian lawmaker and a top aide to Volodymyr Zelenskyy, while on a visit to Washington, had requested United States to impose sanctions on India and China if they continue buying oil from Russia.

=== Protest against transfer of ammunition to Ukraine ===
On 2 September 2022, The Economic Times reported that India has strongly raised objection against the transfer of Pakistan's manufactured arms and ammunition to Ukraine through Royal Air Force's aircraft with the government of United Kingdom.

== Indian diaspora ==
A small but vibrant Indian community lives in Ukraine, composed mostly of business professionals and students. There are about 18,000 Indian students studying in Ukraine, mainly in the field of medicine. Indian business professionals work predominantly in the fields of pharmaceuticals, IT, engineering, medicine, and education. The ‘India Club’, founded by Indian expats in 2001, actively engages the Indian diaspora in Ukraine and organises several events - such as a Diwali festival, cricket tournaments, a Holi festival, Indian dance festival, screenings of Bollywood movies, etc. An Indian student from Madlauda wrote an autobiography on his life in Ukraine, the atrocities of the Russian invasion of Ukraine and resulting Operation Ganga in a book titled The Life of Tolka.

On 4 March 2022, India asked Ukraine and Russia to enforce a truce in the northeastern Ukrainian city of Sumy to allow hundreds of Indian students besieged there to be evacuated as the situation worsened.

== See also ==
- Operation Ganga
- Indian Embassy in Ukraine
- Foreign relations of India
- Foreign relations of Ukraine
