= Embassy of Ukraine, New Delhi =

Embassy of Ukraine in the Republic of India
- Logo of Embassy of Ukraine in the Republic of India
- Location: New Delhi, India
- Address: C-6/5, Vasant Vihar, New Delhi, 110057
- Coordinates: 28.5686°N 77.1590°E
- Opened: February 1993
- Ambassador: Dr. Oleksandr Polishchuk
- Jurisdiction: Republic of India
- Website: india.mfa.gov.ua/en

The Embassy of Ukraine in the Republic of India is the diplomatic mission of Ukraine to India. The Embassy of Ukraine in New Delhi covers the services for India, Sri Lanka, Bangladesh, the Maldives, Bhutan and Nepal.

== History ==
The embassy is located at New Delhi, Delhi. The diplomatic relations between Ukraine and India were established in 1992, following Ukraine's independence after the dissolution of the Soviet Union. The embassy in New Delhi was established in February 1993 to facilitate diplomatic engagement and cooperation between the two nations and its the first one in Asia.

Since its establishment, the embassy has played an important role in strengthening ties in areas such as trade, education, science and technology, and cultural exchange.

== Cultural diplomacy ==
The embassy is actively involved in promoting Ukrainian culture in India through exhibitions, workshops, and collaborative cultural events. It works with local institutions and organizations to enhance people-to-people connections and cultural understanding.

The embassy has also supported educational initiatives involving Indian students. In 2026, it facilitated a nationwide essay contest organised by the East European Development Institute (EEDI) and PT Global Edu under the project Ukraine and South Asia: Open Dialogues. The contest received over 950 entries from more than 200 schools across India, and winners were felicitated in the presence of Ambassador Oleksandr Polishchuk.

== See also ==
- Ministry of Foreign Affairs of Ukraine
- India–Ukraine relations
