= Sandeep Chakravorty =

Indian diplomat

Sandeep Chakravorty IFS
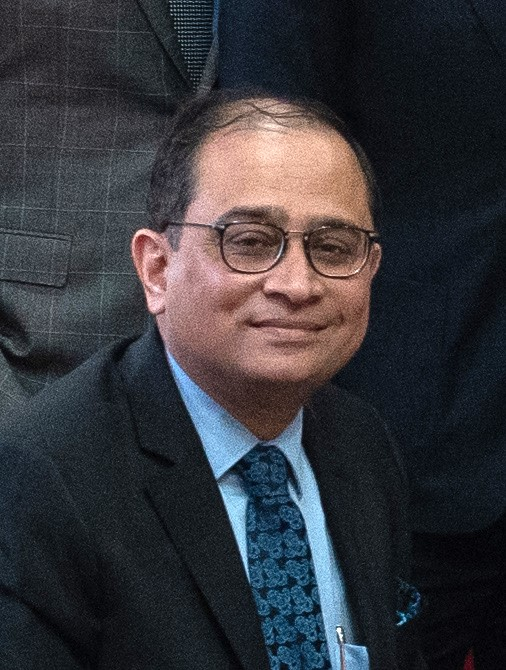
- Chakravorty in 2019

Ambassador of India to Indonesia
- Incumbent
- Assumed office August 2023
- Preceded by: Manoj Bharti

Ambassador of India to Peru
- In office 10 July 2015 – 2 August 2017
- Preceded by: Manpreet Vohra
- Succeeded by: Mandarapu Subbarayudu

Personal details
- Occupation: Indian Foreign Service

Sandeep Chakravorty is the Ambassador of India to Indonesia. He is the former Ambassador of India to Peru.

== Early life and education ==
Sandeep Chakravorty was born on April 5, 1968. He holds a postgraduate degree in Forestry Management, as well as a Master's degree in Advanced Studies in International and European Security from Geneva University and a Master's degree in Sociology.

== Career ==
Prior to joining the Indian Foreign Service, he worked for over five years in non-profit organizations in India, focusing on environment and sustainable development projects. He has a long-standing interest in conservation and sustainability issues involving forests, mangroves, and wildlife.

Chakravorty joined the Indian Foreign Service in 1996. He served as the Deputy High Commissioner of India to Bangladesh (July 2012), Ambassador of India to Peru with concurrent accreditation to Bolivia (July 2015 to August 2017), and Consul General in New York (August 2017 to 2020). He has also served in Indian missions in Spain and Colombia.

On July 21, 2023, he was appointed as the Ambassador of India to Indonesia, with concurrent accreditation to Timor-Leste. Previously, he served for three years as Joint Secretary (Europe West) at the Ministry of External Affairs, handling India's relations with Europe and the European Union. On October 23, he presented his credentials to the President of Indonesia. On December 20, he presented his credentials to the President of Timor-Leste.
