= Operation Ganga =

Evacuation of Indians from Ukraine

- Part of the 2022 Russian invasion of Ukraine
- Operational scope: Humanitarian relief
- Planned by: Ministry of External Affairs and Indian Armed Forces
- Objective: Evacuation of Indian nationals
- Date: 26 February 2022 – 11 March 2022; Beyond 11 March 2022 for nationals left if assistance sought
- Executed by: Ministry of External Affairs, Indian Air Force and Air India, IndiGo, SpiceJet, Air India Express, Go First, AirAsia India, with the support and coordination of the government and embassies of neighbouring countries.
- Outcome: About 25,000 Indian nationals were evacuated 147 citizens of 18 other countries were evacuated
- Casualties: one student killed one student injured

Operation Ganga was an evacuation mission carried out by the Indian government to rescue its citizens stranded in neighboring countries of Ukraine during the 2022 Russian invasion of Ukraine. The citizens were also transported to Romania, Hungary, Poland, Moldova, and Slovakia and from there to India with assistance from these countries. India maintained a neutral stance during the invasion. Indian Prime Minister Narendra Modi had a phone call with Ukrainian President Volodymyr Zelenskyy on 26 February 2022 during which, among other issues, the safety of students was brought up.

The first evacuation flight from Bucharest reached New Delhi with 249 nationals at around 2:55 am Indian Standard Time (IST) on 27 February. Four union ministers—namely, Hardeep Singh Puri, Jyotiraditya Scindia, Kiren Rijiju and V.K. Singh—were sent the next day to neighbouring countries of Ukraine to assist in prioritizing coordination with local authorities. The Indian Air Force and multiple Indian private airlines provided logistical support. India had about 20,000 Indian nationals in Ukraine, out of which just over 18,000 were students.

Approximately 16,000 Indian citizens were present in Ukraine at the moment of commencement of Russian invasion. By 5 March, about 18,000 had crossed the border of Ukraine. However emergency evacuation was requested by students still in Ukraine, such as in Sumy. Following a "Leave Kharkiv Immediately" embassy advisory on 2 March, the Indian Ministry of Defence released a survival advisory for those still in Ukraine and specifically Kharkiv. By 6 March about 16,000 Indians had been flown to India in 76 flights. On 8 March the MEA said that all students in Sumy have been moved facilitated by humanitarian corridors.

== Background ==
Ukraine government statistics from its Ministry of Education and Science place just over 18,000 Indian students in the country. Hotspots for Indian students in Ukraine included Taras Shevchenko National University of Kyiv, Bogomolets National Medical University and Kyiv Medical University of UAFM. In an affidavit submitted by Indian government in Kerala High Court on 2 March 2022 the government estimated 20,000 Indian nationals in Ukraine.

== Operation ==
Animated map of the military situation (click to view) (For further information see 2022 Russian invasion of Ukraine)

The Indian government through its Embassy in Kyiv issued advisories before the conflict through its communication channels. It had mixed impact. Approximately 4000 Indian nationals left Ukraine before the closure of airspace over the affected areas on the morning of 24 February. The first Indian government advisory was issued on 15 February which was followed by stronger advisories. As it was becoming increasingly difficult to provide assistance to the growing numbers the embassy, on 26 February, advised students not to go to border posts without prior coordination from the embassy. On 28 February, the MEA advised all Indian citizens in Ukraine to move to and seek shelter in the towns of western Ukraine and to go to the border only after coordinating with Indian authorities. The MEA set up multiple information dissemination and communication channels— a round the clock helpline, email, website, fax, other phone numbers—and later on a Twitter handle. The Indian Community Welfare Fund, for Indian citizens in other countries in distress, was activated.

Between 24 February and 7 March, the Indian Prime Minister talked to Ukrainian President Volodymyr Zelenskyy and Russian President Vladimir Putin multiple times about the situation, during which Modi expressed his belief the evacuations were important and acknowledged the warring nations' assistance of them.

A survival advisory on 3 March, put together by Manohar Parrikar Institute for Defense Studies and Analyses, targeted those still in Ukraine and specifically Kharkiv. This included sharing WhatsApp geolocations, usage of a white flag and learning some Russian lines. By mid-6 March, the MEA control room had received over 12,400 calls and 9000 e-mails. On the same day, the Embassy of Ukraine also tweeted the utilization of Google Forms to collect data of those still left in Ukraine. The first flight took place on 26 February from Bucharest in Romania and reached Delhi on 27 February at 2:55 am Indian Standard Time (IST). By 27 February 2022 (Day 3), 469 students were evacuated. By 1 March, over 2000 nationals were back. The next five days saw the number climb to about 16,000. Airlines assisting the evacuation included the private carriers AirAsia India, Air India, IndiGo, Air India Express and SpiceJet. The Indian Air Force provided additional support; multiple C-17 Globemasters were utilized, along with Ilyushin Il-76 aircraft on standby. The evacuations were coordinated with COVID-19 pandemic protocols at airports. IndiGo and Air India went on to carry out the maximum number of flights. AirAsia India operated multiple flights from Budapest in Hungary and Suceava in Romania to Delhi. Additionally, the airline operated 16 domestic flights in collaboration with Governments of Odisha and Kerala to facilitate the onwards journey of over 2,500 Indians evacuated as part of Operation Ganga.

Prime Minister Narendra Modi dispatched special envoys to assist coordination efforts. The special envoys were high level Union Ministers– ministers of civil aviation, transport, law, and petroleum and natural gas. Jyotiraditya Scindia would assist coordination from Romania and Moldova, Kiren Rijiju from Slovakia, Hardeep Singh Puri from Hungary and General V. K. Singh from Poland. By 28 February the Prime Minister had chaired at least three high level meetings related to the operation with the external affairs minister and secretary and the national security advisor. The PM (head of government) briefed the President of India Ram Nath Kovind (head of state) on the situation on 1 March. On 2 March India, including through its National Disaster Response Force (NDRF) stocks, sent a batch of humanitarian relief in form of medical aid, tents, blankets, sleeping mats and solar lamps.

On 10 March, the last stranded Indian Nationals of about 600 from Ukraine's Sumy were brought to Rzeszow airport in Poland via 13 buses, and then were finally brought back to India on 11 March via three flights, accomplishing the operation. On the same day, India's Minister of External Affairs S. Jaishankar on Twitter hailed the operation, thanking everyone who were responsible and helped to accomplish this mission. Prime Minister Narendra Modi interacted with Indian diaspora who were at the forefront of the operation in respective neighbouring countries via video conferencing.

== Situation ==
Educational hostels and bunkers in buildings in Ukraine provided shelter for those unable to travel to evacuation points. Students faced problems withdrawing and exchanging money. Indian students were less prepared for how to react to the escalating military situation as compared to the Ukrainians (Russo-Ukrainian War).

On 1 March the Indian Ministry of Foreign Affairs announced that all Indians have left the capital of Kyiv. The Indian Embassy in Ukraine, in all caps, on 2 March tweeted "LEAVE KHARKIV IMMEDIATELY" and that, using any means possible, reach nearby locations including Pisochyn. (These are 11, 12 and 16 kilometers walking distance.) The deadline given was "by 6 pm local time (9.30 pm IST)". A defence advisory on 3 March suggested multiple survival guidelines to those still left. All Indians were evacuated by Pisochyn by 5 March. The last major locality with Indians was Sumy. Around 1,000 foreign students were among the first wave of evacuees from Sumy to Poltava on 8 March, among whom 576 are Indians. This was facilitated by humanitarian corridors. Indian sailors and several sailors from other countries stranded in port of Mykolaiv were also provided evacuation assistance in the same time period.

Some Indian students reported through social media that they faced trouble and others were beaten up, while attempting to cross the Ukraine-Poland border. But they were relieved and made to feel home by the selfless Indian diaspora in Poland who were at the border. Poland's Ambassador to India clarified that it was a humanitarian situation and Poland would ease border crossings and all nationalities would be provided food and shelter. Attempts were made, including in an Indian embassy advisory, to get Indian students to use the tricolour, the flag of India, to provide identification. Some students who crossed over found temporary accommodation by themselves, while others required embassy arrangements. Evacuation flights had taken off from locations including Budapest in Hungary, Rzeszow in Poland, Kosice in Slovakia.

Russian passage had been sought on the eastern front of Ukraine to evacuate through Russia. Some Indian students in Russia had started preparing for eventualities even though Russia was showing signs of normalcy. The blow of the COVID-19 pandemic to education since 2020 threatened to be worsened for the students by the ongoing situation. The Russian Embassy in India in the capital saw small scale protests on 25 February by some of the families whose relatives haven't been able to get themselves out.

On 17 March, Official Spokesperson of the Ministry of External Affairs stated that there are still some Indians in Ukraine and if assistance is required it will be provided.

== Routes ==
2005 derivative UN map. Ukraine is 784.93 miles (1,263.22 km) wide and 346.4 miles (557.5 km) long.

From Ukraine, land routes to the bordering states were used. From the capitals of the bordering countries, there were flights to Indian cities of Delhi and Mumbai. From Moldova, there were land routes to Romania.

== Casualties ==
A fourth year medical student from the Indian state of Karnataka named Naveen S.G. was India's only casualty in the war.

== Return ==
Students shared narratives regarding their experiences. People from Kerala were mentioning about how the Malayali community in Poland made them feel at home. Chandramohan Nallur, a resident of Poland along with Pradeep Nayar were the first responders who worked with embassy staff and the MEA crisis management desk. Chandramohan Nallur became the face of Operation Ganga among students and parents of those who crossed via Poland. He along with Pradeep Nayar ran the largest volunteer group of 98 from day 1 until the Sumy evacuation. Families and some senior government leaders greeted their children at the airports. The Indian embassy also helped in the evacuation of 147 citizens of 18 other countries—two Lebanese and three Syrian sailors in Mykolaiv, nine Bangladeshi nationals, a Pakistani national, and Nepalese, Tunisian student.

== Reactions ==
A number of stranded Indian students in Ukraine had criticised Indian government's rescue efforts. They had also uploaded a number of videos on social media to highlight their plight in Ukraine. The criticism intensified after an Indian student was killed in the Russian shelling of Kharkiv. In response, several supporters of the ruling Bharatiya Janata Party, including individuals followed by ministers in the central government, resorted to online harassment and misinformation targeting students, especially those who were related to opposition politicians or even just criticised the government. Such supporters even spread pro-Russia propaganda and misinformation, claiming that Russia said it would ensure the safety of Indian students and would not shoot down Indian airliners (no Indian airliners ever flew over Ukraine during the war) and even stopped their war for six hours at India's request.

A number of Indian politicians and citizens had also criticised government's efforts and accused it of not doing enough to rescue the students. They also asked government to scale up its efforts to rescue the stranded Indian students. On 28 February, an unidentified Indian student interrupted the reporting of Gaurav Sawant, an Indian journalist, and said that there was no help and no representative to assist them.

However, the government was later praised, sometimes by officials within the government itself, for carrying out the operation successfully by evacuating close to 20,000 Indian nationals from Ukraine. Prime Minister Narendra Modi said that the mission was a success due to 'India's growing influence', and stated that it was carried out when other countries were facing problems.

== In popular culture ==
The 2023 non-fiction book The Life of Tolka, co-authored by Nitin Chopra and Niveditha Preeth, provides a first-hand account of an Indian medical student's (Chopra) survival and eventual evacuation during the conflict. It is being made into a movie. Another film, Operation Ganga, directed by Vishnu Mohan and starring Mohanlal is currently in production.
