= Manoj Bharti =

Indian politician and former diplomat (born 1963)

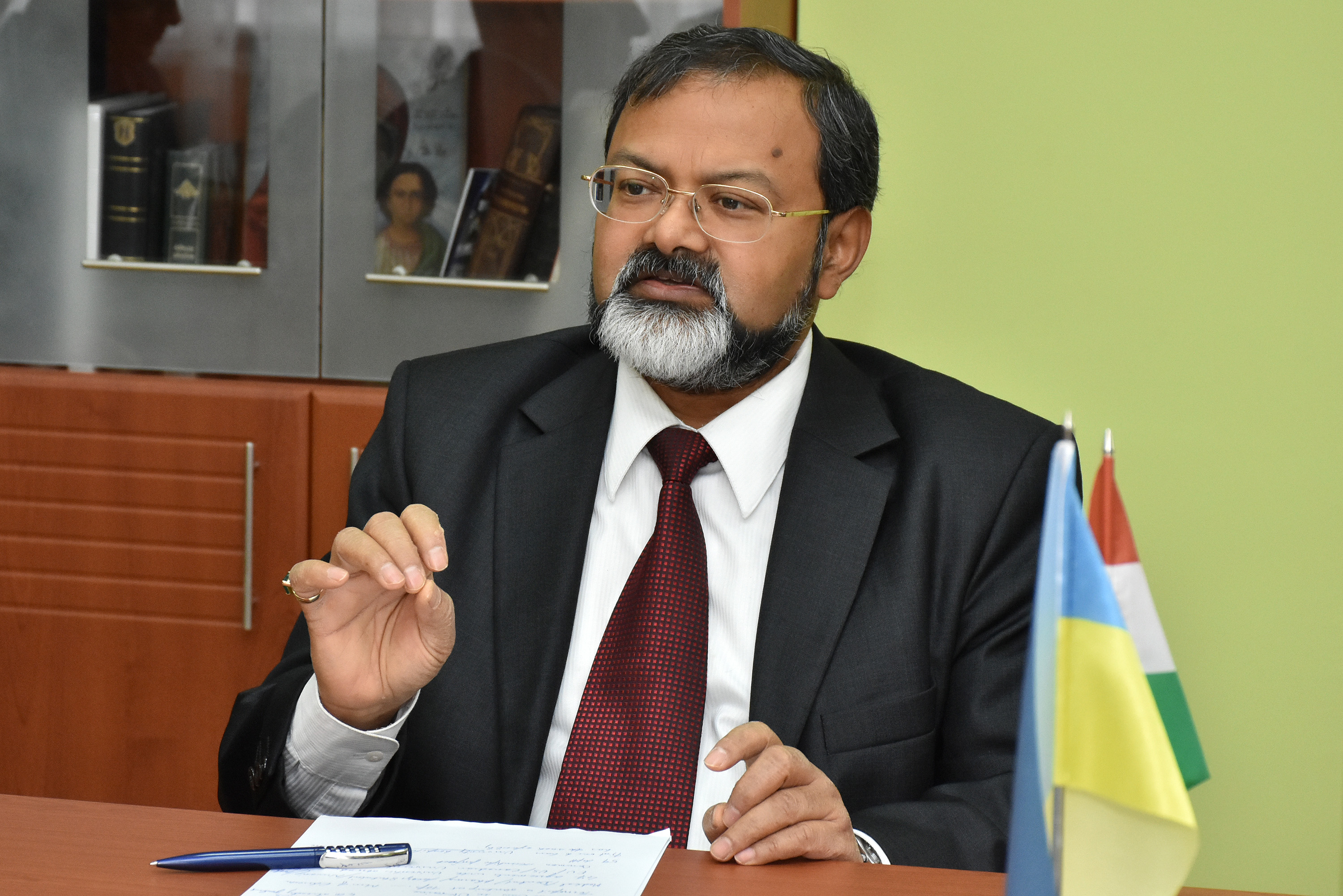

1st President of the Bihar State Jan Suraaj Party
- Incumbent
- Assumed office 2 October 2024
- President: Uday Singh (from 19 May 2025)
- Preceded by: office established

Ambassador of India to Indonesia and Timor-Leste
- In office October 2020 – March 2023
- Preceded by: Pradeep Kumar Rawat
- Succeeded by: Sandeep Chakravorty

Ambassador of India to Ukraine
- In office 10 September 2015 – 12 October 2018
- Preceded by: Rajiv Kumar Chander
- Succeeded by: Partha Satpathy

Ambassador of India to Belarus
- In office 20 May 2011 – 10 September 2015
- Preceded by: Ramesh Chander
- Succeeded by: Pankaj Saxena

Personal details
- Born: Manoj Kumar Bharti; 19 February 1963 (age 63) Madhubani, Bihar, India
- Party: Jan Suraaj Party
- Spouse: Anamika Bharti
- Children: 2
- Education: Netarhat Residential School; IIT Kanpur (B.Tech); IIT Delhi (M.Tech)
- Occupation: Politician, Ex Diplomat

Manoj Kumar Bharti (born 19 February 1963) is an Indian politician and retired diplomat of the Indian Foreign Service who is currently serving as the Bihar State President of the Jan Suraaj Party, a political party founded by Prashant Kishor in Bihar. A retired Indian Foreign Service (IFS) officer, Bharti has held ambassadorial positions in several countries.

== Early life and education ==
Manoj Bharti was born in Madhubani district, Bihar. He completed his schooling at Netarhat School (now in Jharkhand) Bharti pursued higher education in engineering, earning a Bachelor of Technology (B.Tech) in Electrical Engineering from the IIT Kanpur, followed by a Master of Technology (M.Tech) from IIT Delhi. He also holds an honorary doctorate from Zaporizhzhya State Medical University in Ukraine.

== Diplomatic career ==
Bharti joined the Indian Foreign Service in 1988. Throughout his diplomatic tenure, he served as India's ambassador to multiple countries, including Ukraine, Belarus, Timor-Leste, and Indonesia.

From May 2011 to September 2015, Bharti served as the Ambassador of India to Belarus. In September 2015, he was appointed as the Ambassador of India to Ukraine, where he remained until 2018.

On 13 October 2020, he was appointed as the Ambassador of India to Indonesia. During his tenure as Ambassador to Indonesia, Bharti was involved in coordinating high-level visits, including the participation of the Indian delegation during the 2022 G20 summit hosted by Indonesia. On 31 December 2021, he received an additional concurrent accreditation as Ambassador to Timor-Leste (East Timor).

His last posting before retirement in March 2023 was as the Ambassador to Indonesia. He also served in various capacities within the Ministry of External Affairs in New Delhi, including as Secretary (Administration).

He retired from the Indian Foreign Service in March 2023.

== Political career ==
After retiring from diplomatic service, Bharti transitioned into politics. On 2 October 2024, he was appointed as the Working President of the Jan Suraaj Party founded by former political strategist Prashant Kishor and subsequently the Bihar State President of the Party. This appointment was in line with Kishor's commitment to inclusive leadership, as Bharti hails from the Dalit community.
