= Viktor Kaspruk =

Ukrainian political scientist and journalist

Victor Arsenyevich Kaspruk (Ukrainian: Віктор Арсенович Каспрук; born April 30, 1955, in Kiev) is a Ukrainian political scientist, political analyst, journalist, and publicist.

== Biography ==
In 1980, Kaspruk graduated from the Taurida National V.I. Vernadsky University (Simferopol, Crimean Oblast, Ukrainian SSR, Soviet Union, now Simferopol, Autonomous Republic of Crimea, Ukraine). He is the author of more than 1,800 articles on the subject of Ukrainian and international politics. He has trained with courses at the Ministry of Foreign Affairs of Egypt in Cairo (1998) and courses organized by the Center for International Cooperation with the Ministry of Foreign Affairs of Israel "Mashav" (2006).

Research and interests by Victor Kaspruk include internal Ukrainian politics, the Middle East, the Arab world, and the following countries: Egypt, Syria, Palestine, Iraq, Saudi Arabia, Kuwait, UAE, Lebanon, Jordan, Libya, Tunisia, Morocco, Algeria, Sudan, Somalia, Mauritania, Yemen, Djibouti, Eritrea, Qatar, Bahrain, Oman, Israel, Iran, Afghanistan, Pakistan, Latin America, the United States, and South-Eastern Asia, in particular: China, India, Japan, South Korea and North Korea.

Victor Kaspruk has been an international observer for The Ukrainian Week magazine and newspaper Den ("Day"). He cooperates with the Ukrainian services of Radio Free Europe/Radio Liberty.

He has been Laureate of the magazine Suchasnist ("Modernity") and the League of Ukrainian patrons of 2006, for a series of articles on domestic and world politics, as well as interviews with leading figures of the Belarusian opposition.
