= Baykar Bayraktar family =

Family of UAVs produced by Turkish company Baykar

Bayraktar family
- Bayraktar UAV family

General information
- Type: Unmanned aerial vehicle
- National origin: Turkey
- Manufacturer: Baykar
- Designer: Baykar
- Status: In service
- Primary user: Turkish Armed Forces
- Number built: 1,100+

History
- Variants: Bayraktar Mini UAV; Bayraktar TB1; Bayraktar TB2; Bayraktar Akıncı; Bayraktar TB3; Bayraktar Kızılelma; Bayraktar VTOL

The Bayraktar UAV or Bayraktar UCAV is a family of unmanned aerial vehicles designed and manufactured by Turkish company Baykar. The UAVs were developed for the Turkish Armed Forces from 2004 until the present. Some models are designed for surveillance and reconnaissance only, others are capable of tactical ground-strike missions. Baykar is also developing drones to counter other aerial systems. The word bayraktar means flag-bearer in Turkish.

== Bayraktar Mini UAV ==
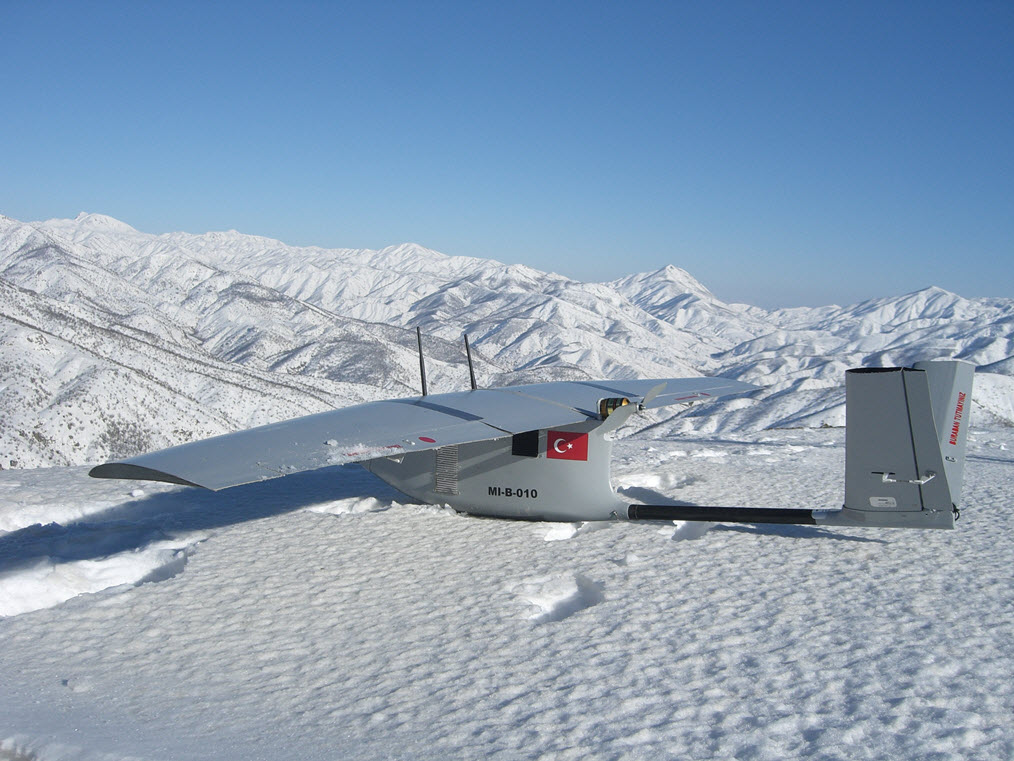
Bayraktar Mini UAV

Bayraktar Mini UAV is a miniature UAV and the first UAV produced by Turkish company Baykar.

With the concept of short range day and night aerial reconnaissance and surveillance applications, system design activities started in 2004. An initial prototype Bayraktar Mini A was developed in 2005, and following successful autonomous flight demonstrations, Baykar was awarded a contract to start series production by the Turkish Armed Forces. The first batch was composed of 19 aircraft and they were mainly deployed to the southeast parts of Turkey for use in counterterrorism operations.

After hundreds of hours of flight trials, the system was subjected to major modifications and improved versions were developed. As a result, Bayraktar Mini B was fielded and became operational in December 2007 to be initially operated by the Turkish Armed Forces. It was first presented to the general public in 2010, during the Efes exercise.

Due to its success in the region, the system was also exported to the Qatar Armed Forces in 2012. The development of the aircraft is being continued and the most recent version (Bayraktar MINI D) has twice the communication range and 3 times higher maximum altitude of its predecessors.

== Bayraktar TB1 ==
Bayraktar TB1 (or Bayraktar Çaldıran) is the prototype UAV made for the Tactical UAV program of the Undersecretariat for Defence Industries (Savunma Sanayii Mustesarligi or SSM; now the Presidency of Defense Industries) of Turkey, started in 2007. SSM invited two companies to compete for a prototype demonstration phase of the Tactical UAS Program. In 2009, Kale-Baykar, a joint venture between the Kale Group and Baykar Technologies, demonstrated Block A (named Bayraktar Çaldıran) with its dual redundant avionics system and fully autonomous takeoff and landing capability. The aircraft was selected as the winner of the program. While the contract was signed with the Presidency of Defense Industries for Bayraktar TB1s, these products were not delivered and remained as prototypes for Bayraktar Block 2s. Instead, serial production commenced with Bayraktar TB2.

== Bayraktar TB2 ==
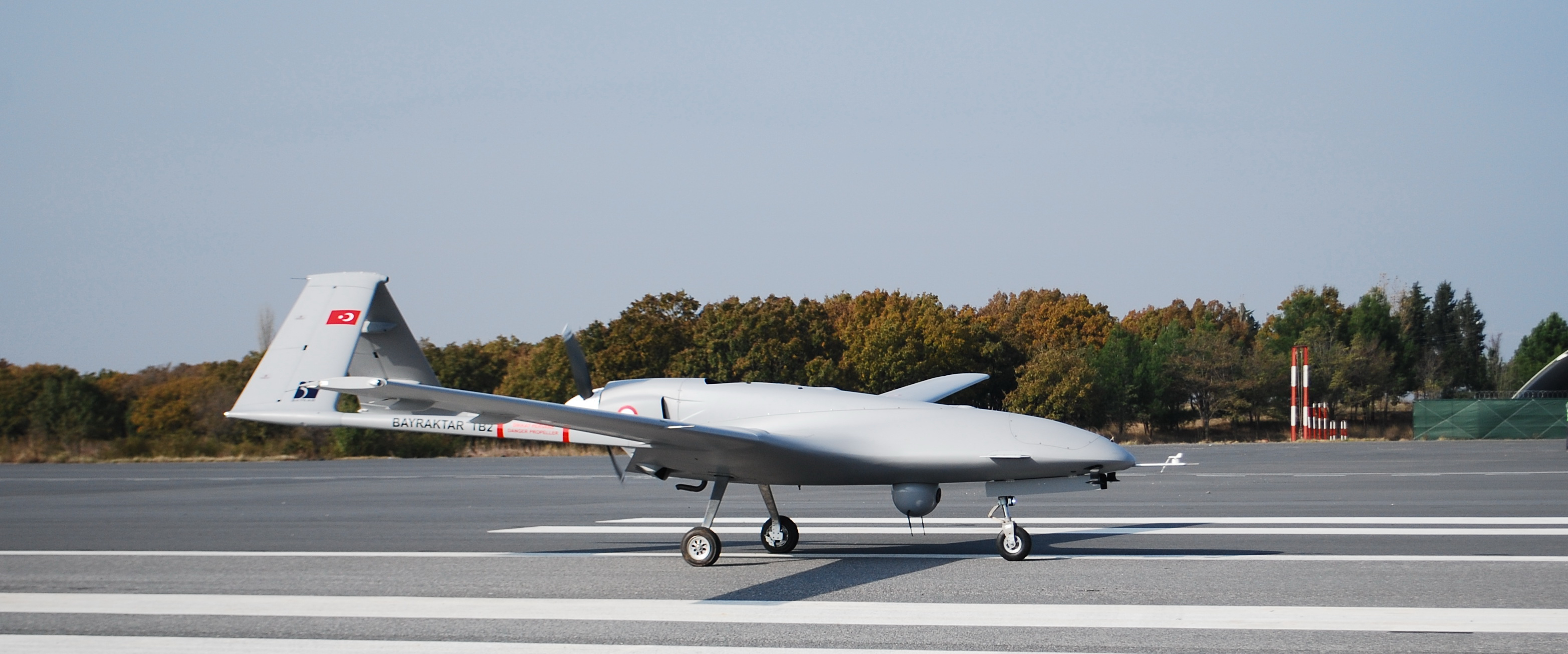
Bayraktar TB2

Bayraktar TB2 is the serial production aircraft of the first tactical UAV of Baykar, Bayraktar TB1.

Baykar started to develop a new combat tactical aerial vehicle system on request of Presidency of Defense Industries, after the experiences of its first tactical UAV Bayraktar Çaldıran (TB1) flown in 2011. The Bayraktar TB2 conducted its maiden flight in August 2014. On 18 December 2015, a video was published for the missile test of Bayraktar TB2 in collaboration with ROKETSAN, testing Roketsan's MAM (Smart Micro Munition)s and TUBITAK-SAGE BOZOK laser-guided bombs for the first time.

The Turkish Armed Forces describe Bayraktar as a "Tactical UAV Class" to avoid competition with the TAI Anka UAV, but international standards would classify it as a medium-altitude long-endurance UAV.

== Bayraktar Akıncı ==
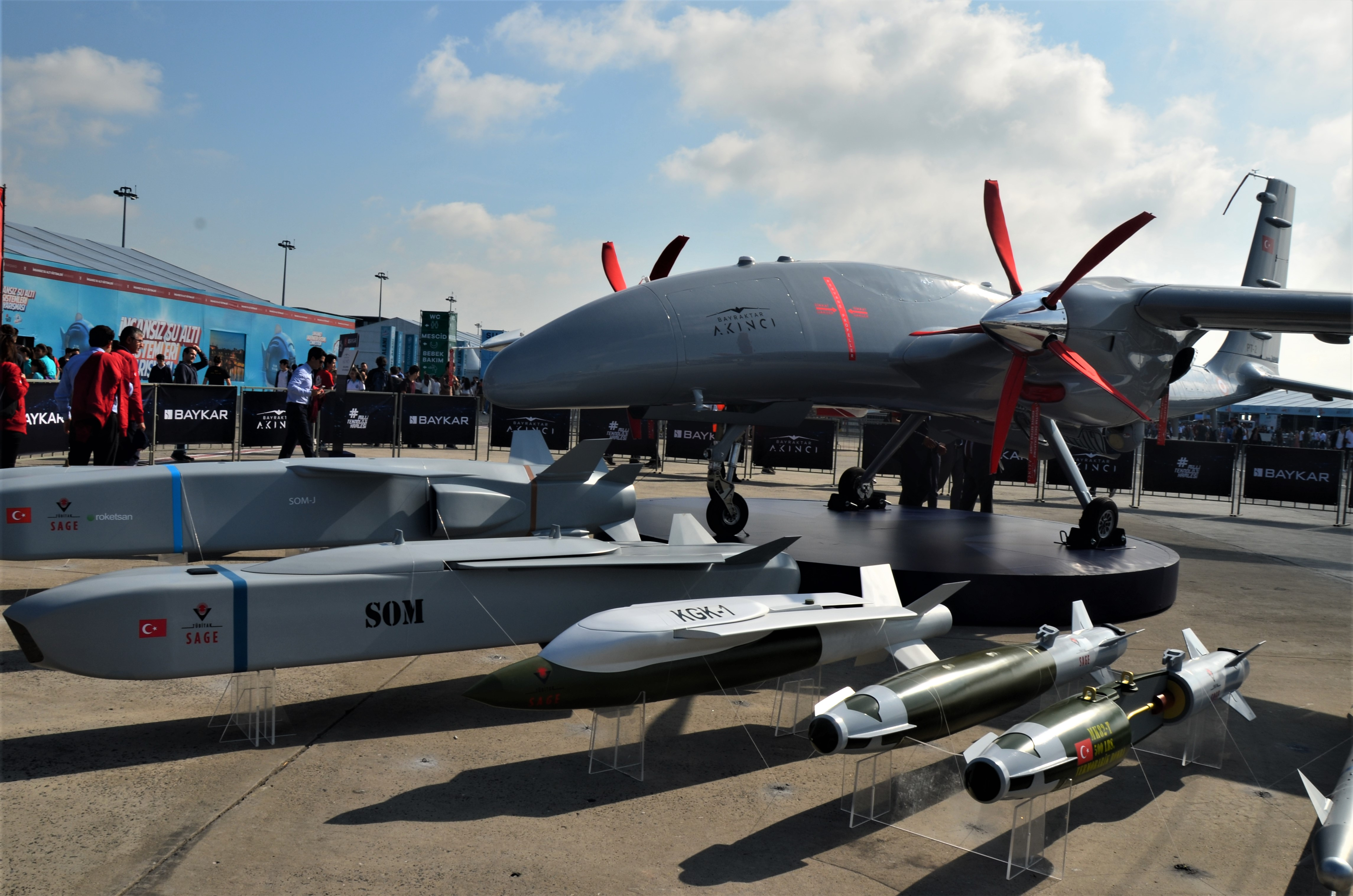
Bayraktar Akıncı at Teknofest 2019

Bayraktar Akıncı is the first High-altitude Long Endurance (HALE) class unmanned combat aerial vehicle (UCAV) of Baykar.

The aircraft has a 5.5+ ton maximum takeoff weight (MTOW), with 1350+ kg of this composed of payload. Akıncı is equipped with two turboprop engines of 450 or 750 hp. Akinci is equipped with electronic support and countermeasure systems, dual satellite communication systems, air-to-air radar, collision avoidance radar and national advanced synthetic aperture radar.

== Bayraktar TB3 ==
The Bayraktar TB3 is a variant of the TB2 that is capable of landing on a ship deck. In February 2021, chairman of the Presidency of Defense Industries (SSB) Ismail Demir made public a new type of UAV being developed by Baykar that is planned to be stationed to Turkey's first drone-carrying amphibious assault ship, TCG Anadolu. The new aircraft being developed is a naval version of the Bayraktar TB2, powered by an engine developed by Turkish company Tusaş Engine Industries (TEI). Demir said that between 30 and 50 folding-winged Bayraktar TB3 UAVs will be able to take off from and land on the deck of Anadolu. Baykar's Chief Technology Officer (CTO) Selçuk Bayraktar said in 2021 that the initial flight of the Bayraktar TB3 was scheduled for 2022.

== Bayraktar Kızılelma ==
Bayraktar Kızılelma (Red Apple) is a proposed supersonic jet-powered single-engined stealth carrier-capable unmanned combat aircraft in development in 2021, planned to fly for the first time in 2023.

According to data shared by the company, Bayraktar Kızılelma will have an operational altitude of 35,000 feet (11,000 metres), a take-off weight of 5.5 tons, a payload of 1.5 tons, and an ammunition carrying capacity of 1 ton.

== Bayraktar YIHA III ==
Bayraktar YIHA III is a low-cost loitering munition. Precision-guided aerial weapon system co-developed by Pakistan's National Aerospace Science and Technology Park (NASTP) and Turkey's Baykar Technologies. Designed as a modern solution for asymmetric warfare, the YIHA III is engineered to engage high-value targets with minimal logistical footprint and reduced operational cost.

== Operational history ==
=== Ethiopia ===
As of 2023, Bayraktar TB2 drones are used in Ethiopia. During the 2023 war in Amhara Region of Ethiopia, drone strikes in late 2023 mostly killed civilians, according to media reports. BBC News reported 30 to 40 people killed in a strike on Amhara Sayint district on 10 December. Al Jazeera English obtained footage of a 30 November drone strike that killed five civilians, including hospital staff, near Delanta Primary Hospital in Wegel Tena. The footage showed "an ambulance ablaze with its roof caved in, consistent with a direct aerial hit.

=== PKK/YPG–Turkey conflict ===
Turkish military use TB-2 gained prominence in counterinsurgency operations against Kurdistan Workers' Party (PKK) and People's Protection Units (YPG) positions across the border in Iraq and Syria. Turkey, the US and the European Union consider PKK as a terrorist organization. Turkey also considers YPG as a terrorist organisation, since its close ties to the PKK.

=== Libya ===
In June 2019, international news media reported that the Libyan, UN recognized, Government of National Accord (GNA) used Bayraktar TB2s to strike an airbase held by General Haftar's Libyan National Army (LNA). Despite the UN embargo on Libya's ongoing civil war, it is suspected that at least three Bayraktar TB2 UCAV were being used over Tripoli by the GNA government forces. On 6 June 2019, two GNA Bayraktar TB2 drones were destroyed along with an operation room by LNA attacks on Mitiga Airport. Video evidence shows at least one Bayraktar TB2 flying over Tripoli about to land at Mitiga's Military section, under control of GNA-allied forces.

=== Syria ===
In March 2020 Bayraktar TB2s, Anka-S UAVs and an array of Koral electronic jammers were deployed and extensively used in coordinated action to strike Syrian Army targets on the ground during the Operation Spring Shield launched by Turkey following losses the Turkish forces incurred at the hands of the Russian forces in northwestern Syria at the end February 2020. The deployment was assessed by experts to be a success and a tactical game changer.

=== Azerbaijan and 2020 Nagorno Karabakh war ===
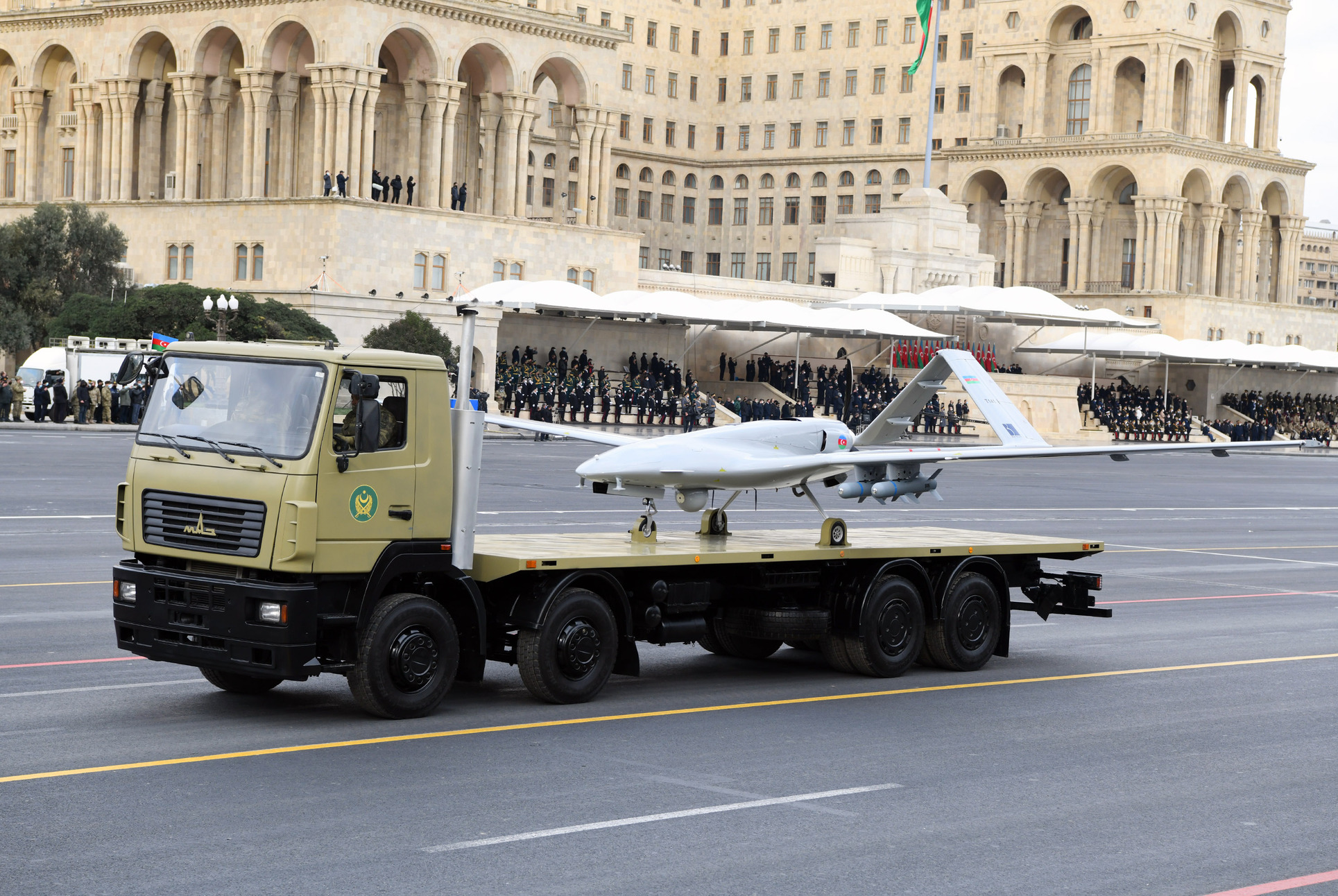
Bayraktar TB2 at 2020 Victory Parade in Baku, Azerbaijan

In June 2020 the Defence Minister of Azerbaijan, Zakir Hasanov, announced that Azerbaijan had decided to purchase Bayraktar drones from Turkey. During the 2020 Nagorno-Karabakh war, Bayraktar TB2s were used against Armed Forces of Armenia with great success. Azerbaijan used TB-2s to destroy Armenian artillery, infantry positions and military vehicles including BM-30 Smerch MLRS, T-72s tanks, BMP-1 and BMP-2 IFVs. Several Osa, Strela-10 and 5 S-300 air defense systems were also destroyed by TB2s.

=== Ukraine ===
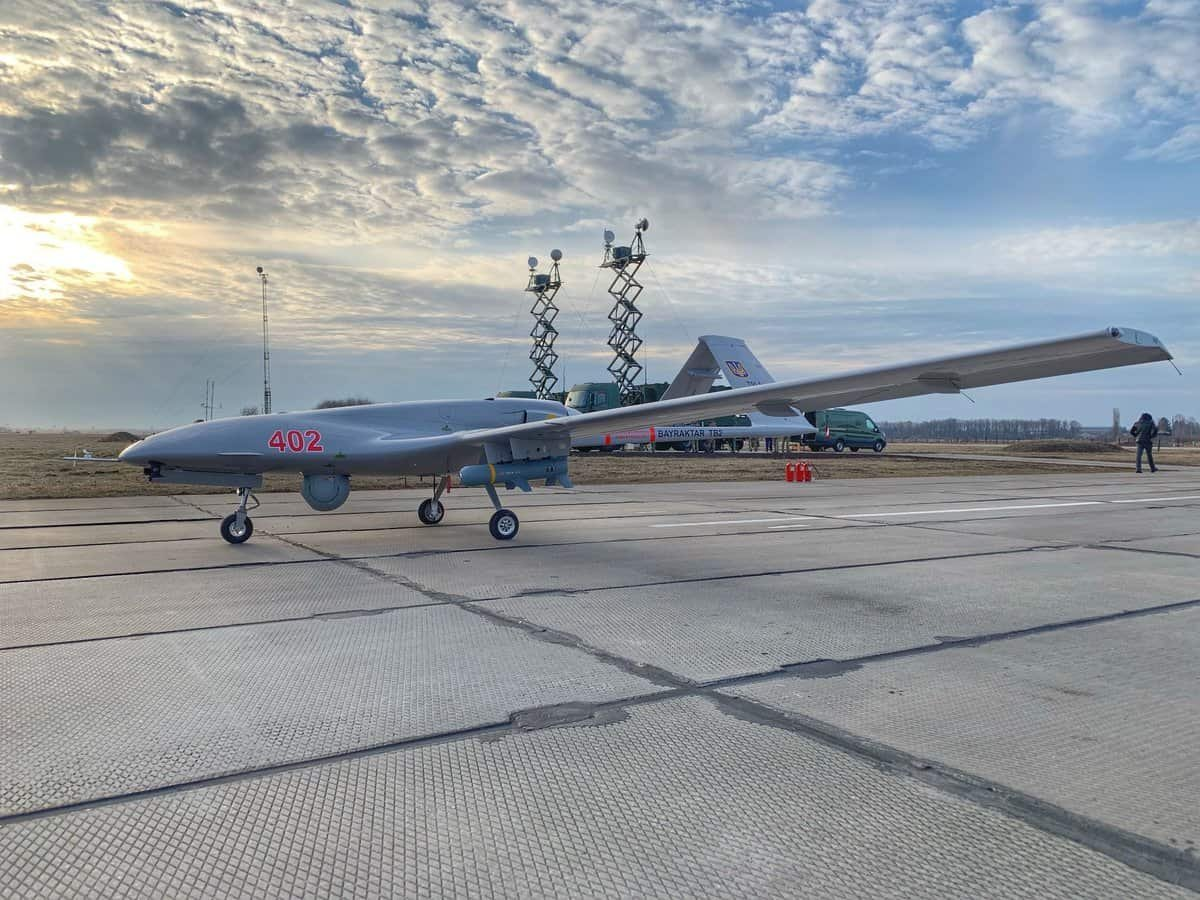
Bayraktar TB2 of Ukrainian Air Force armed with MAM-L, two ground control stations in the background

As a part of its military modernization program, the Armed Forces of Ukraine acquired 12 Bayraktar TB2s in 2019. After successful use of the aircraft, the Ukrainian Navy ordered 5 additional Bayraktar TB2s, reportedly delivered in 2020. Meanwhile, Turkish and Ukrainian officials announced the establishment of a joint venture to produce 48 additional Bayraktar TB2s in Ukraine.

Ukraine's Bayraktar TB2s were used extensively during the 2022 Russian invasion for surveillance of and attacks on Russian ground convoys. The drones played a significant role in deterring Russian advances in the early stages of the conflict.

Ukrainian Chief of General Staff Valery Zaluzhny made available Bayraktar TB2 operation photographs on his Facebook account, including destruction of a Russian-made Buk Air Defense Missile System.

== Operators ==
It has been reported that Baykar has exported its drones to 32 countries, as of September. Of these countries, there are 31 TB2 operators and 8 Akinci operators. 7 of the Akinci operators also use TB2 as well.

Some of the operators countries of the Baykar drones has not been publicly announced. The list of the known countries are as follows:

- Turkey:
  - Bayraktar Mini UAV
  - Bayraktar TB2
  - Bayraktar Akıncı
- Qatar
  - Bayraktar Mini UAV
  - Bayraktar TB2
- Azerbaijan
  - Bayraktar TB2
  - Bayraktar Akıncı
- Libya
  - Bayraktar TB2
- Ukraine
  - Bayraktar Mini UAV
  - Bayraktar TB2
- Turkmenistan
  - Bayraktar TB2
- Morocco
  - Bayraktar TB2
- Poland
  - Bayraktar TB2
- Kyrgyzstan
  - Bayraktar TB2
- Niger
  - Bayraktar TB2
- Ethiopia
  - Bayraktar TB2
- Pakistan
  - Bayraktar TB2
  - Bayraktar Akıncı
  - Bayraktar YIHA III
- Djibouti
  - Bayraktar TB2
- Burkina Faso
  - Bayraktar TB2
- Rwanda
  - Bayraktar TB2
- Togo
  - Bayraktar TB2
- Albania
  - Bayraktar TB2
  - Bayraktar YIHA III

== Gallery ==
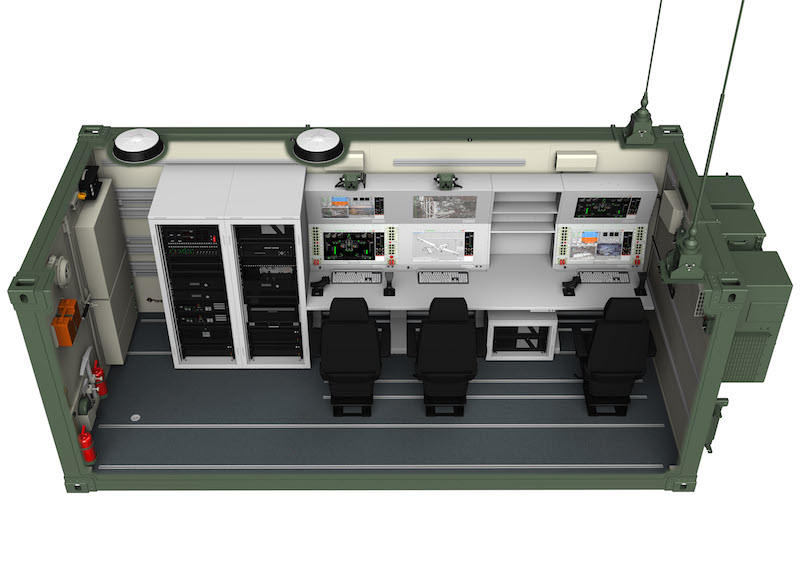
Bayraktar GCS cutaway

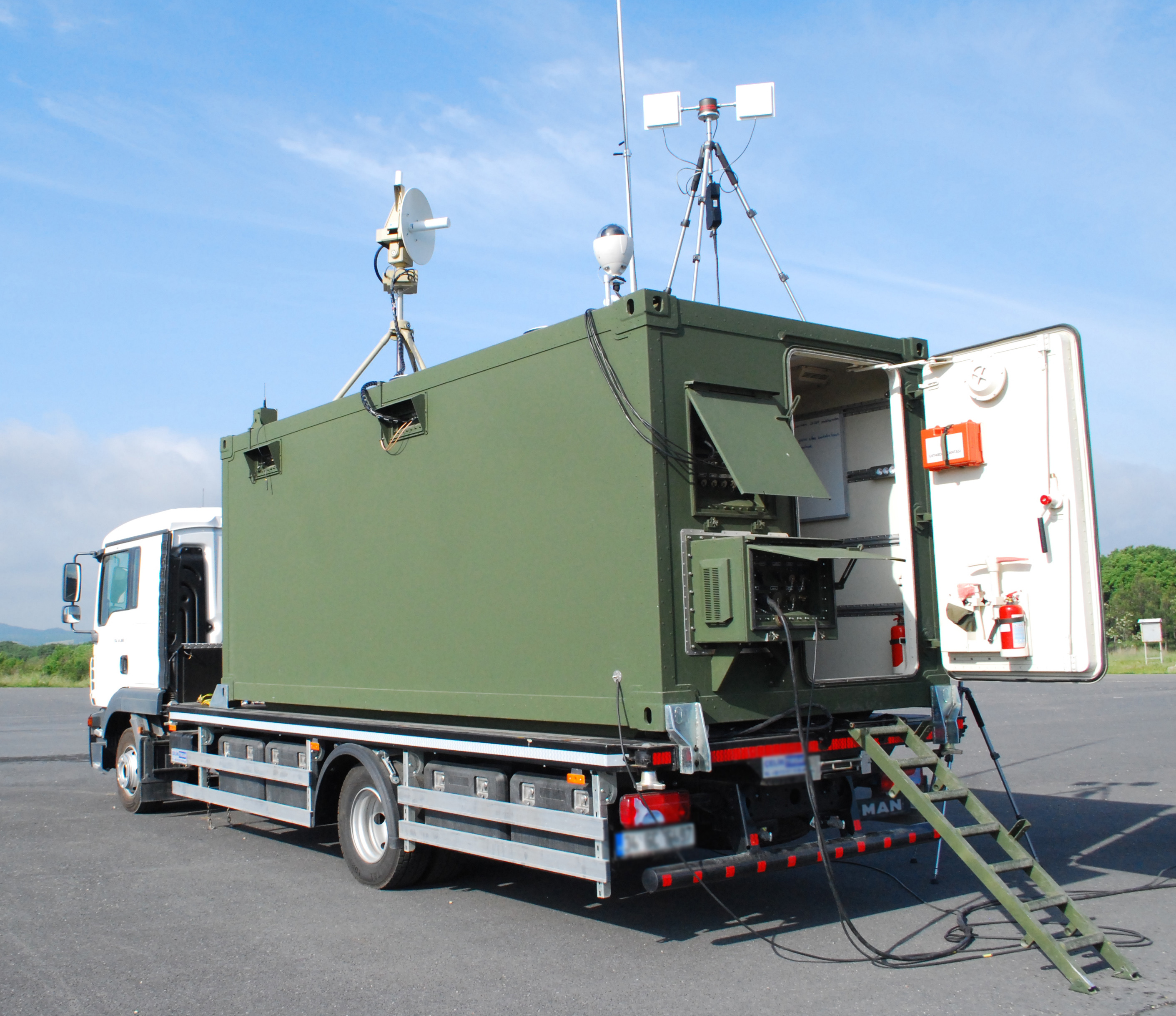
Bayraktar Ground Control Station

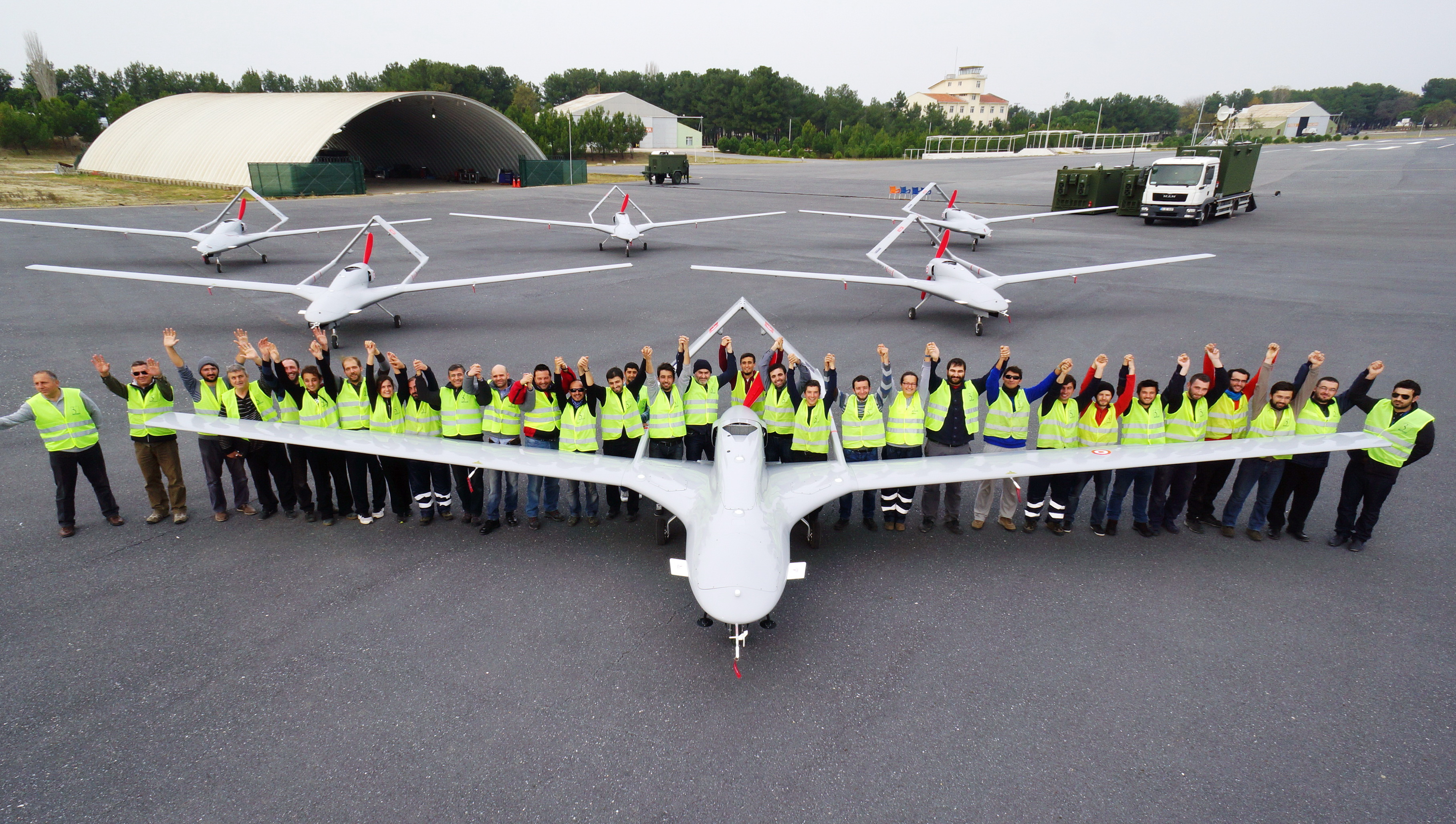
Baykar UAV Team

== See also ==
- MAM (Smart Micro Munition)
- TAI Anka
- TAI Aksungur
