= TAI Gözcü =

Turkish unmanned aerial vehicle

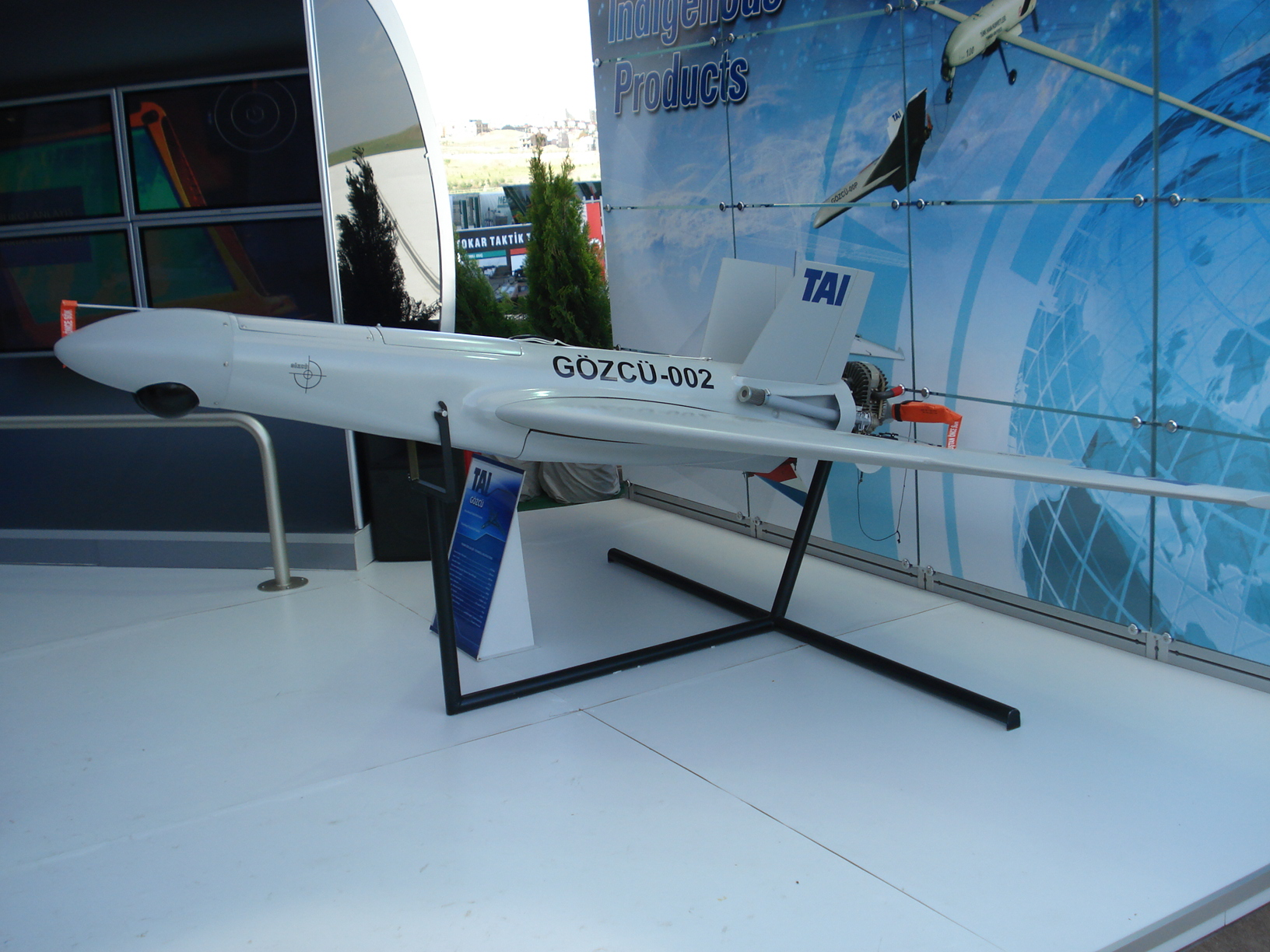
- TAI Gözcü prototype on display in 2007

General information
- Type: Short-range tactical Unmanned surveillance and reconnaissance aerial vehicle
- Manufacturer: Turkish Aerospace Industries (TAI)
- Status: In use
- Primary user: Turkish Armed Forces

History
- First flight: March 6, 2007

TAI Gözcü is a radio-controlled short-range tactical drone. Designed, developed and built by Turkish Aerospace Industries (TAI), the unmanned aerial vehicle (UAV) is in use by the Turkish Armed Forces for intelligence, surveillance, target acquisition and reconnaissance purposes. Gözcü is the Turkish word for observer.

== Overview ==
Built of composite material, the drone is launched from a catapult, and is recovered by parachute. It has 85 kg (187 lb) max. takeoff weight and can reach an altitude of 12,000 ft (3,700 m). Having 8 kg (18 lb) max. payload capacity, TIA Gözcü carries EO/IR sensor, and transfers real-time video imagery in a range up to 50 km (31 mi). It has waypoint navigation and autonomous flight capabilities.

The UAV with delta wings and V-tail is propelled by a Wankel engine in pusher configuration having 38 hp (28 kW), and can cruise with a max. speed of 90 kn (170 km/h). Its endurance is over 120 minutes.

== Development ==
The maiden flight of the drone took place on March 6, 2007. The first flight with camera was on April 4, 2007. The prototype of TAI Gözcü was presented to public at the International Defence Industry Fair IDEF in Mai 2007, and took part in the Victory Day parade end August the same year. The following flight tests in September 2007 showed that the UAV was in the beginning unable to monitor the vehicles in the terrain, over them it was flying, because it was too fast. Unlike the target drones the surveillance drones must fly slower, the TAI officials admitted. The drone was presented at a military exercise for the first time during the EFES-2010 exercise.

TAI Gözcü is intended to serve nonstop for intelligence, surveillance and reconnaissance in military operations against infiltration and activities of terrorists in southeastern Turkey.

== Specifications ==
Data from TR Defence- Defence Talk

General characteristics

- Crew: 0
- Length: 2.45 m (8 ft 0 in)
- Wingspan: 3.75 m (12 ft 4 in)
- Height: 0.66 m (2 ft 2 in)
- Max takeoff weight: 85 kg (187 lb)
- Powerplant: 1 × Wankel engine 28 kW

Performance

- Maximum speed: 170 km/h (110 mph, 92 kn)
- Endurance: 120 min
- Service ceiling: 3,700 m (12,100 ft)

== See also ==
- Bayraktar Mini UAV
- Bayraktar TB2
- Bayraktar Akıncı
- Bayraktar Tactical UAS
- TAI Anka
- TAI Aksungur
