= Baykar Bayraktar Kemankeş 1 =

Long-range cruise missile from Turkey

Kemankeş 1
- Type: Cruise missile
- Place of origin: Turkey

Production history
- Manufacturer: Baykar

Specifications
- Mass: 45 kg (99 lb)
- Length: 1.73 m (5 ft 8 in)
- Height: 0.40 m (1 ft 4 in)
- Wingspan: 1.14 m (3 ft 9 in)
- Engine: Jet engine
- Operational range: 100 km (62 mi)
- Flight ceiling: 10,000 ft (3,000 m)
- Flight altitude: 7,500 ft (2,300 m)
- Boost time: 20 min.
- Maximum speed: 180 kn (330 km/h; 210 mph)
- Guidance system: AI-assisted EO or GNSS
- Launch platform: UAV

Baykar Bayraktar Kemankeş 1, shortly Kemankeş 1 (literally: "Archer") is a Turkish long-range, all-weather, jet-powered, AI-assisted mini cruise missile, which was developed and manufactured by Baykar.

The cruise missile can be launched from the unmanned aerial vehicles of the same company, like Akıncı, TB2 and TB3. It is capable of autonomous flight with an AI-powered autopilot system. With its jet engine, the smart mini cruise missile travels rapidly at max. 180 kn (330 km/h; 210 mph), can remain up to 20 minutes airborne, and is effective against the riskiest targets behind enemy lines. Thanks to its AI-assisted optical guidance system, it can recognize its target and destroy it with pinpoint accuracy even in challenging weather conditions. It can be operated day and night without being affected by electronic jamming. It maintains all line-of-sight communication with the platform it is connected to. Thus, it transmits all telemetry information and camera images from the platform to the ground control station, enabling data monitoring.

Besides being a smart, long-range munition, Kemankeş 1 is also a weapon system with capabilities for reconnaissance, surveillance, and intelligence gathering. This is made possible by a day camera of two-axis stabilization, 36x optical zoom, 60°- 2°(H) viewing angle and 1920×1080p full HD.

Carrying 10 kg (22 lb) payload at 45 kg (99 lb) max. takeoff weight, it is 1.73 m (5 ft 8 in) long, 0.40 m (1 ft 4 in) high and has a wingspan of 1.14 m (3 ft 9 in).

Kemankeş 1 was first exhibited to the public at the Teknofest held in Istanbul Atatürk Airport on 27 April-1 May 2023 Two Kemankeş 1 mini cruise missiles, launched from a Bayraktar TB2 UAV over Keşan near Edirne, passed the maximum flight and dive test over a distance of 100 km (62 mi) on 23 March 2025. On 3 July the same year, the mini cruise missile hit the ground targets with pinpoint accuracy during a test, after it had successfully completed its aerial target destruction mission launched from a Bayraktar Akıncı UAV one week before.

== See also ==
- Baykar Bayraktar Kemankeş 2.
