= Baykar Bayraktar KALKAN =

Turkish unmanned combat aerial vehicle

Bayraktar KALKAN VTOL

General information
- Type: VTOL unmanned surveillance and reconnaissance aerial vehicle
- National origin: Turkey
- Manufacturer: Baykar
- Issued by: Baykar
- Status: production phase
- Primary user: Turkish Armed Forces

History
- Introduction date: 2022
- First flight: August 2019; 7 years ago
- In service: 20 August 2026; 40 days ago

Bayraktar KALKAN VTOL (Turkish: Bayraktar KALKAN DİHA, "Kalkan", literally: "Skydagger") is a vertical take-off and landing (VTOL) unmanned aerial vehicle developed by Baykar defense technology as a versatile and flexible system specifically designed for intelligence, reconnaissance, and surveillance missions. It was announced for the first time in 2019. Bayraktar VTOL was initially intended to be used in the drone-carrying Landing helicopter dock TCG Anadolu.

== History ==
The project was launched in 2019, with subsequent flight tests commenced thereafter. It achieved a total of 30 flight tests as of 7 April 2024.

In early 2025, Baykar announced that they have successfully launched an FPV drone, called "Skydagger", from the aircraft mid-air, demonstrating its "mothership" capability.

The integration of Kalkan VTOL into the Turkish Armed Forces inventory took place aboard the frigate TCG Oruçreis (F 245) during the Teknofest "Mavi Vatan" (literally: Blue Homeland) event held in Gölcük Naval Shipyard, Turkey on 20 August 2026.

== Specifications ==
Kalkan VTOL has purported capabilities of fully autonomous takeoff, cruise, and landing as well as semi-autonomous flight capabilities. The Kalkan VTOL uses four electric motors to assist in take-off and it uses an internal combustion engine during cruising operations.

=== General Features ===
- Wing Span: 5 m (16 ft)
- Body length: 1.5 m (4 ft 11 in)
- Height: 0.7 m (2 ft 4 in)
- Maximum takeoff weight: 78 kg (172 lb)
- Payload capacity: 3 kg (6.6 lb)

=== Performance ===
- Cruise speed: 48 KTAS
- Maximum speed: 55 KTAS
- Communication range: +70 km (43 mi)
- Operational range: 500 km (310 mi)
- Operational altitude: 6,000 ft (1,800 m)
- Ceiling: 10,000 ft (3,000 m)
- Maximum altitude: 14,500 ft (4,400 m)
- Endurance: 6 hours (70 hours according to another source)

=== Advanced Features ===
- Fully automatic flight
- Autonomous landing and take-off
- Semi-autonomous flight
- Triple redundant flight control system
- Laser distance meter

== See also ==
- Baykar Bayraktar TB2
- Baykar Bayraktar Akinci
- TUSAŞ Anka
- TUSAŞ Aksungur
