= Baykar Bayraktar Kemankeş 2 =

Long-range cruise missile from Turkey

Kemankeş 2
- Type: Cruise missile
- Place of origin: Turkey

Production history
- Manufacturer: Baykar

Specifications
- Mass: 75 kg (165 lb)
- Length: 2.47 m (8 ft 1 in)
- Height: 0.49 m (1 ft 7 in)
- Wingspan: 1.35 m (4 ft 5 in)
- Engine: Jet engine
- Operational range: 150 km (93 mi)
- Flight ceiling: 10,000 ft (3,000 m)
- Flight altitude: 7,500 ft (2,300 m)
- Boost time: 30 min.
- Maximum speed: 180 kn (330 km/h; 210 mph)
- Guidance system: AI-assisted EO or GNSS
- Launch platform: UAV

Baykar Bayraktar Kemankeş 2, shortly Kemankeş 2 (literally: "Archer") is a Turkish long-range, all-weather, jet-powered, AI-assisted mini cruise missile, which is a further development of Kemankeş 1 by Baykar.

The cruise missile can be launched by jet-assisted take-off (RATO) or vehicle-based launch system. It is capable of autonomous flight with an AI-powered autopilot system. With its jet engine, the smart mini cruise missile travels rapidly at max. 180 kn (330 km/h; 210 mph), can remain up to 30 minutes airborne, and is effective against the riskiest targets behind enemy lines. Thanks to its AI-assisted optical guidance system, it can recognize its target and destroy it with pinpoint accuracy even in challenging weather conditions. It can be operated day and night without being affected by electronic jamming. It maintains all line-of-sight communication with the platform it is connected to. Thus, it transmits all telemetry information and camera images from the platform to the ground control station, enabling data monitoring.

Carrying 20 kg (44 lb) payload at 75 kg (165 lb) max. takeoff weight, it is 2.47 m (8 ft 1 in) long, 0.49 m (1 ft 7 in) high and has a wingspan of 1.35 m (4 ft 5 in).

The cruise missile's introduction took place during the military exercise EFES 2024 in May.

== See also ==
- Baykar Bayraktar Kemankeş 1.
