= Andair =

British aviation products manufacturer

- Type: Limited company
- Founded: 1995
- Founder: Andrew Phillips
- Headquarters: Havant, Hampshire, UK
- Key people: Owen Phillips (director), Andrew Phillips (secretary)
- Revenue: ▲£1.15m GBP (2019)
- Number of employees: 12
- Website: www.andair.co.uk

Andair Ltd is a British manufacturer of general, sport and civilian aircraft and related machinery based in Havant, Hampshire, England. It is a small family-run company with a dozen of employees and total assets £1.15 million. Founded in 1994 by father and son, pilots and engineers - Andrew Phillips (secretary, born in 1947) and Owen Hugh Phillips (director, born in 1975), the company was incorporated in 1995. The company's business slogan is 'Andair - precision aircraft components'.

== Manufacturing ==
Andair is a ISO 9001 manufacturer of fuel pumps and filters, fuel selectors, gascolators, check valves, extensions, oil/air separators, locking fuel caps. It is one of the key players in global fuel systems and blast valves market. The business is based in a modern industrial unit and operates a multitude of up-to-date CNC mills, assembly equipment and test rigs. Their aircraft range is represented by three models - Vans RV6 G-GRIN, Vans RV7 G-RVTT and RV7 G-TERO.

=== Products used in combat drones ===
After learning that their products were utilised to create combat drones, Andair announced the discontinuation of all sales to Baykar Makina, a subsidiary of Turkish defence company Baykar. In the press release made on 11 January 2021, the company cited being approached by Armenian Embassy on 2 November 2020 and its own investigation as the reason for this decision. The British manufacturer became the latest company to stop selling equipment to Turkey after its components were found in drones shot down during the Nagorno-Karabakh conflict.

== Clients ==
Having played a significant role in the design and manufacture of light aircraft fuel system components within the amateur-build aircraft sector, Andair has then established a significant presence in the commercial aviation market as well. Commercial clients include the American Cessna, Cirrus, Vans, Scaled Composites and Northrop Grumman, Canadian Bombardier, Austrian Diamond and Rotax, German Grob, Italian Tecnam, and Czech Sport Aircraft.
