= Baykar =

Turkish defence company

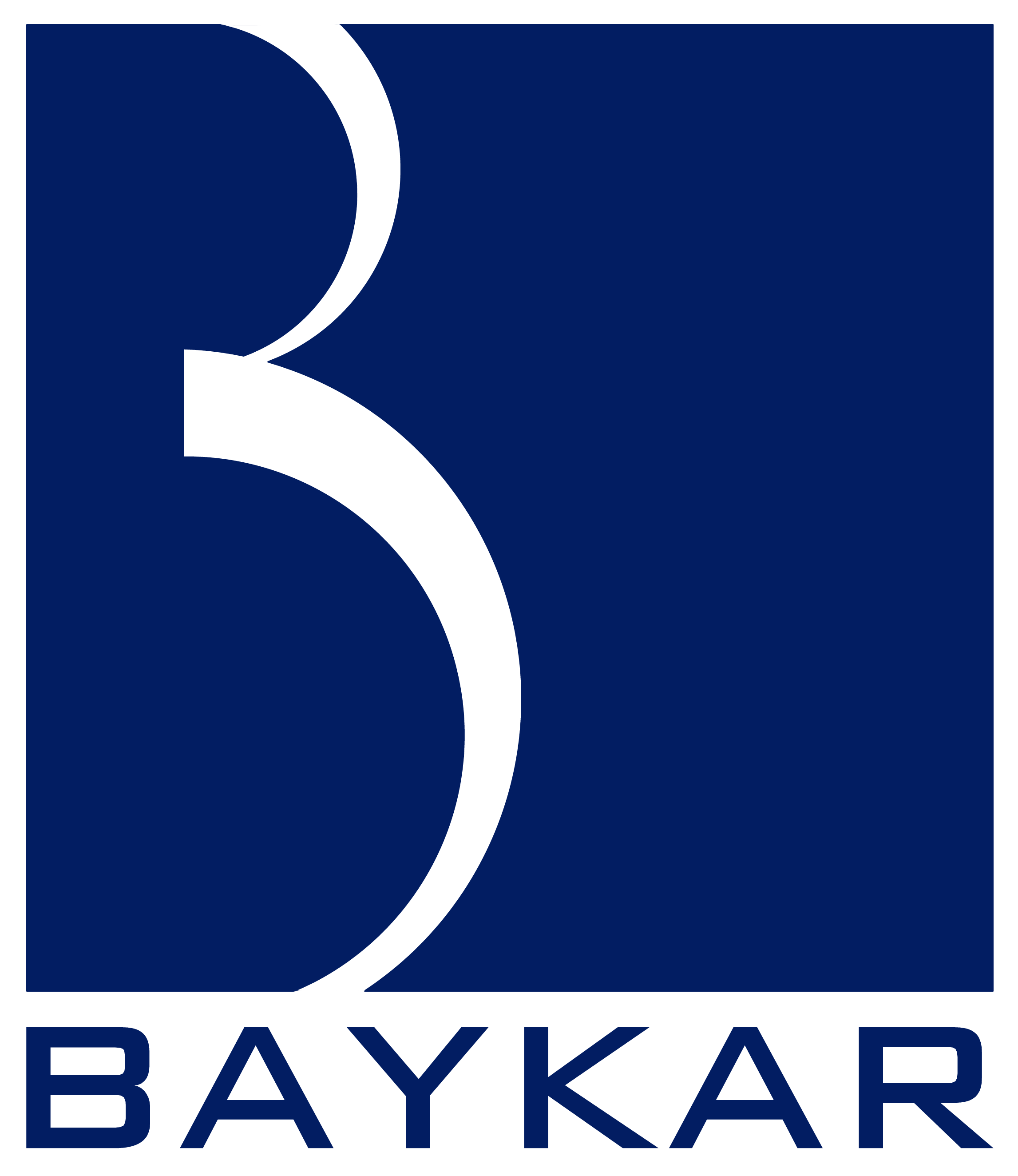
- Type: Private company
- Predecessor: Baykar Makina
- Founded: 1984; 42 years ago
- Founder: Özdemir Bayraktar
- Headquarters: Istanbul, Turkey
- Key people: Selçuk Bayraktar (CTO); Haluk Bayraktar (GM)
- Revenue: ▲$2 billion (2023)
- Number of employees: 8000+
- Subsidiaries: Piaggio Aerospace (100%); LBA Systems (50%, joint Baykar and Leonardo partnership)
- Website: www.baykartech.com

Baykar is a private Turkish defence company specialising in UAVs, C4I and artificial intelligence.

== Name ==
Baykar is a portmanteau of the words Bayraktar Kardeşler (Bayraktar Brothers). The company presently operates under the names "Baykar Teknoloji" (Baykar Technology) and "Baykar Makina Sanayi ve Ticaret A.Ş." (Baykar Machine Industry and Trade Inc.)

== History ==
The company was founded in 1984 as Baykar Makina, a CNC precision machining supplier subcontractor by Özdemir Bayraktar, with the primary goals being production of automotive parts such as engines, pumps and spare parts to ensure the localization of the automotive industry. Established in this direction, Baykar is an engineering company founded with 100% domestic capital. It took steps towards producing unmanned aerial vehicles in the 2000s in line with the developments and progress in the aviation sector. Bayraktar Mini UAV was the first unmanned aerial system produced entirely with domestic capital, included in the Turkish Armed Forces inventory in 2007. Having launched R&D activities for this purpose, Baykar has realized pioneering productions in its field and by producing subsystems, it has achieved to provide technical support to Turkish national defence industry, as the latter has grown and started exporting weapons including Baykar drones. Baykar's portfolio of advanced UAVs includes Bayraktar Tactical UAS (Bayraktar TB1), Bayraktar TB2 UCAV, Bayraktar Akıncı UCAV. It is also developing a flying car (quadricopter) which it started testing in 2020. The car, called Cezeri and weighing 230 kilograms, rose 10 metres above the ground in the tests carried out in Istanbul in September 2020.Haluk Bayraktar stated that Baykar is considering spending $1 billion in the development process of Bayraktar Kızılelma, a jet-powered unmanned aerial vehicle.

Baykar's drones have been used in the Second Nagorno-Karabakh War by the Azerbaijani army which resulted in a series of boycotts from international companies whom Baykar used to buy products from. Domestic drone manufacturing before that war relied on imported and regulated components and technologies such as the engines from Austria (manufactured by Rotax), fuel systems (manufactured by Andair) and missile rack (manufactured by EDO MBM) from the UK, optoelectronics (FLIR sensors imported from Wescam in Canada or Hensoldt in Germany). Engines exports were halted when Canadian Bombardier, owner of Rotax, became aware of the military use of their recreational aircraft engines. In October 2020 Canadian Wescam (optics and sensors) exports were restricted by the Canadian Foreign Ministry. After learning that their products were used to create combat drones, Hampshire-based UK aircraft manufacturer Andair announced the discontinuation of all sales to Baykar Makina on 11 January 2021. The British manufacturer became the latest company to stop selling equipment to Turkey after its components were found in drones shot down during the war.

Turkish industry responded to foreign sales boycotts by announcing provision of domestically manufactured alternatives to Baykar – TEI-PD170 motor (Turkish Aerospace Industries), optical camera (Aselsan CATS system), and fuel valve (Aselsan). Turkish defense industry researcher Kadir Doğan tweeted that cancellation of sales of components to Baykar by foreign companies did not pose a major problem, and that as of January 2021 all those components have been replaced by locally manufactured alternatives.

In 2021 the Ukrainian military for the first time in the war in Donbas used a Bayraktar strike drone, Bayraktar TB2.

In June 2022 the "People's Bayraktar" fundraising project was launched in Ukraine, which managed to fundraise in three days over ₴600 million to purchase three Bayraktar TB2.

The company has a cooperation agreement with Come Back Alive, Ukraine's largest charitable foundation, which was signed in Istanbul on August 3, 2022, by Baykar's CEO Haluk Bayraktar and the Foundation's Director Taras Chmut.

In 2023 it was developing the Bayraktar TB3 due to a lack of fixed-wing aircraft to deploy on the drone-carrying amphibious assault ship TCG Anadolu.

In 2024 Baykar announced that they decided to develop their own engine and that they plan to spend $300 million on engine production within a 5-year period.

On 27 December 2024, it acquired Italian aerospace manufacturer Piaggio Aerospace.

On 6 March 2025, Italian defense firm Leonardo and Baykar have agreed to cooperate on unmanned aerial vehicles.The Italian government approved the Leonardo–Baykar joint venture to develop and produce unmanned aerial systems, subject to conditions limiting international cooperation and exports to countries aligned with EU and NATO policies. The approval was granted under Italy's Golden Power regulations, which also require measures to protect sensitive technologies and classified information.

In May 2026, Safran Electronics & Defense and Baykar signed a strategic partnership agreement covering the development of integrated unmanned aerial systems, advanced navigation technologies, and smart weapon systems. The agreement includes the integration of Safran’s Euroflir electro-optical systems onto Bayraktar TB2 platforms. The partnership combines Safran’s expertise in optronic sensors and navigation with Baykar’s experience in UAV development and operations.

== Key people ==
The company has been led by Özdemir Bayraktar until his death and his sons – Selçuk and Haluk

=== Özdemir Bayraktar ===
Baykar's senior mechanical engineer and chair of the board Özdemir Bayraktar, graduated from Istanbul Technical University's Department of Mechanical Engineering in 1972. He then completed a master's degree at the Department of Engines, with a focus on internal combustion engines. He had positions in many companies that played a leading role in Turkey's industrial sector (Burdur Tractors, Istanbul Retaining Ring Uzel, etc.). In 1984 he took part in the establishment of Baykar Makina to indigenize what was then Turkey's highly import-dependent automotive industry. At Baykar, he directed many unique machining and manufacturing apparatus design processes for the precision machining sector. In 2004 he decided to move on to UAV production with his son Selçuk, who at the time was pursuing a PhD degree on unmanned aerial systems at MIT. He then started to play a pioneering role in Baykar's development of indigenous Unmanned Aerial Vehicle technology, implementing these projects from design to prototype, and subsequently from manufacturing stages to further R&D. He also had a private pilot's license. According to opposition Cumhuriyet newspaper, he had a religiously conservative background, but despite disdainful relations at the time between pious groups and the army, he had ties with several military figures and worked on Turkish Armed Forces projects in the late 1990s. He was awarded the Order of Karabakh by Azerbaijani President Ilham Aliyev in April 2021 for his "contribution to the liberation of Karabakh from the occupation of Armenia" by Bayraktar TB2 drones. He died on 18 October 2021 at the age of 72 in Istanbul.

=== Selçuk Bayraktar ===
Baykar's Chief Technical Officer, Selçuk Bayraktar, was born in 1979 in Istanbul. After attending the prestigious Robert College high school, Selcuk Bayraktar studied electrical engineering at Istanbul Technical University, graduating in 2002. He then pursued an internship at University of Pennsylvania, later obtaining a master's degree in engineering from the same university. Bayraktar went on to study for a PhD degree at the Massachusetts Institute of Technology (MIT), where he worked on unmanned helicopter systems. He completed his master's at MIT in 2006 with a thesis titled "Aggressive Landing Maneuvers for Unmanned Aerial Vehicles". He returned to Turkey in 2007 cutting his PhD studies short to work at Baykar. Bayraktar called on Turkish officials to invest in drone technology in 2005. "If Turkey supports this project, these drones, then in five years it can easily be at the forefront of the world in this field" Bayraktar said in 2005. He has been hailed as a pioneer of what Turkish President Recep Tayyip Erdoğan calls Ankara's rapidly developing "local and national" defence sector. Bayraktar married Erdoğan's daughter Sümeyye in 2016.

=== Haluk Bayraktar ===
Baykar's CEO and general manager, Haluk Bayraktar, has received an undergraduate degree from METU Industrial Engineering in 2000 and completed his master's degree in the same field at Columbia University in 2002. In 2004, he started his doctoral studies in Business Administration at Boğaziçi University. In the same period, he worked as an engineer manager in the project design stages of the works for the development of National and Unique Unmanned Aerial Vehicle Systems within the family company, involved in conceptual design, prototype, testing, production, training and business stages. In 2018, he was elected as the chairman of the Board of SAHA Istanbul Defense and Aviation Cluster and a member of the TUBITAK board of directors in 2018.

== Products ==
=== UAV / drones ===
- Baykar Bayraktar Mini UAV
- Baykar Bayraktar TB1
- Baykar Bayraktar TB2
- Bayraktar VTOL
- Baykar Bayraktar Akıncı
- Baykar Bayraktar TB3
- Baykar Bayraktar Kızılelma

=== Other products ===
- Kemankeş 1 mini cruise missile, can be carried by the Bayraktar TB2, TB3 and Akıncı
- BM100 A 100 hp internal combustion engine for Bayraktar TB2.
- Baykar Cezeri flying car.
- Baykar Bayraktar Kemankeş 2

=== Loitering munition ===
- Baykar K2 Kamikaze
- Baykar Mızrak
- Baykar Sivrisinek

== Gallery ==
Baykar
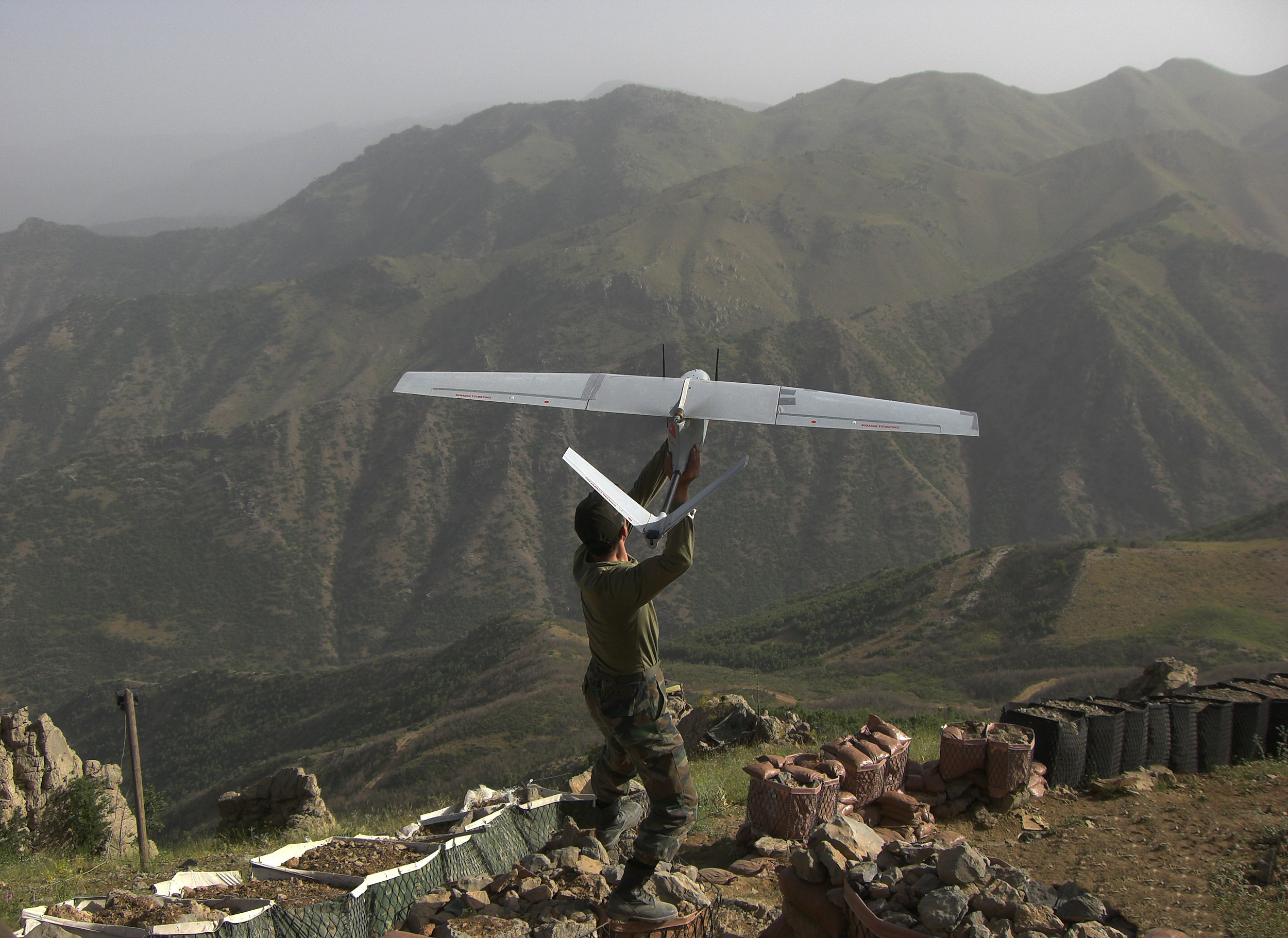
Bayraktar Mini UAV

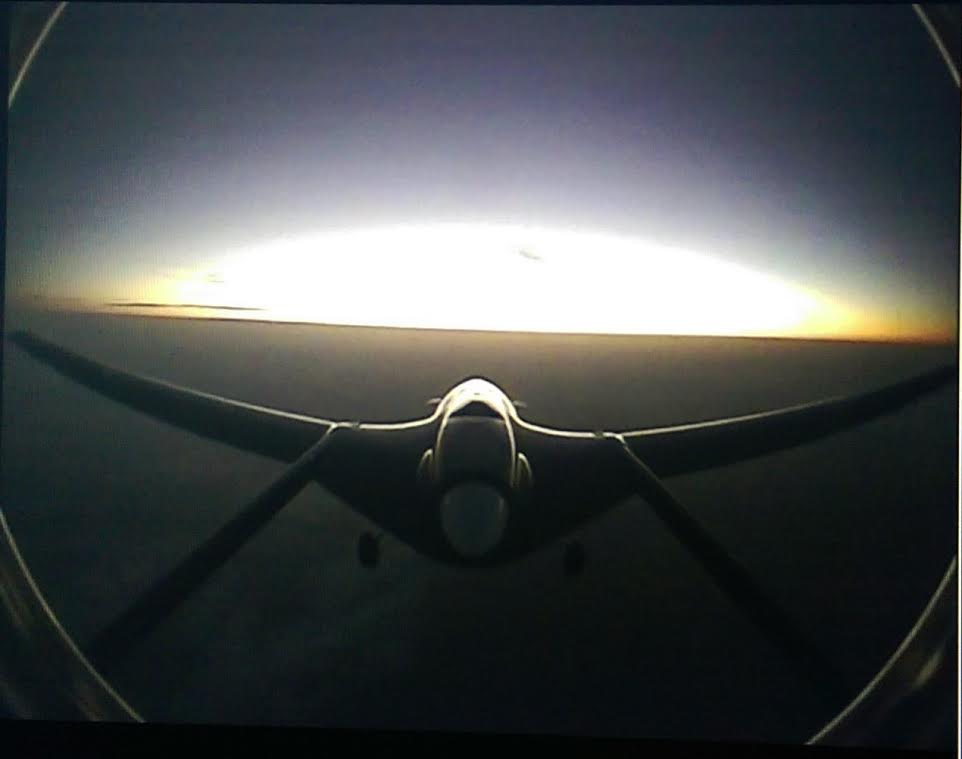
Bayraktar Tactical UAS viewed from its tail camera

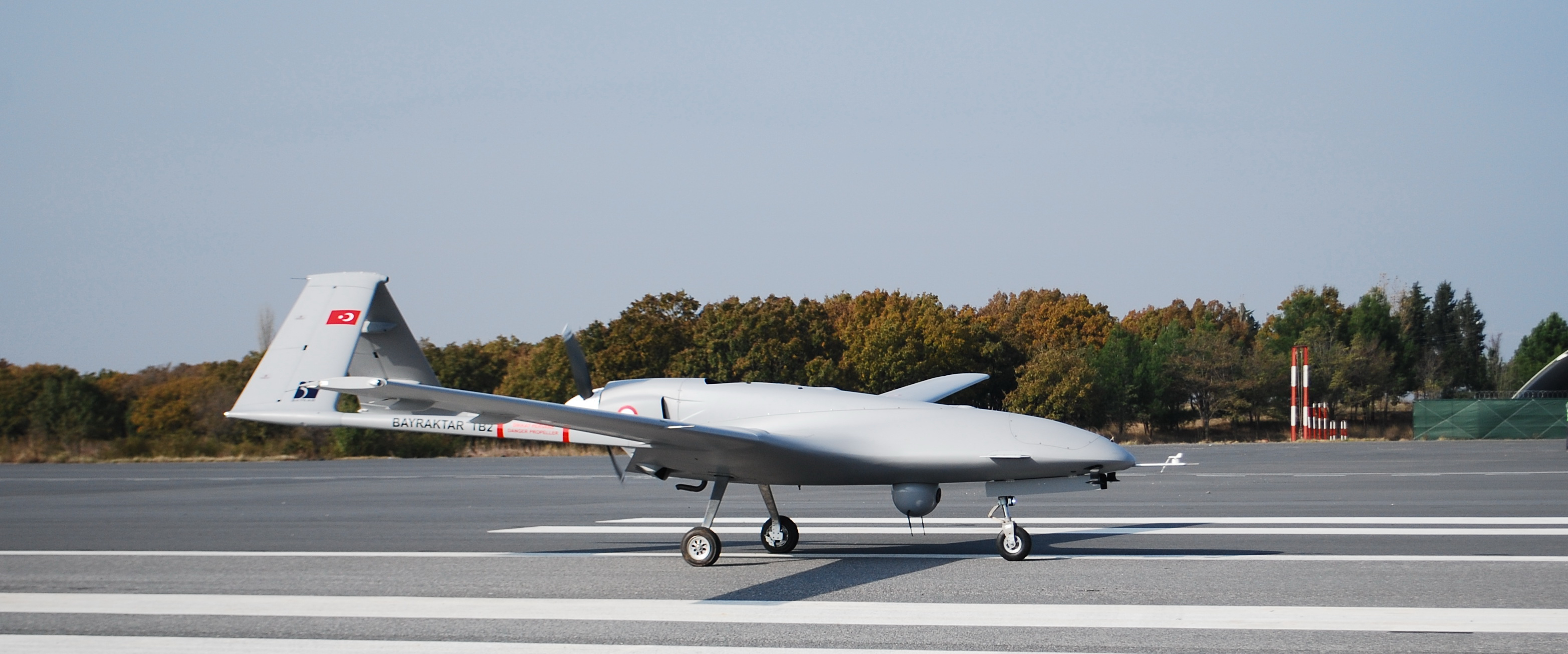
Bayraktar TB2 UCAV

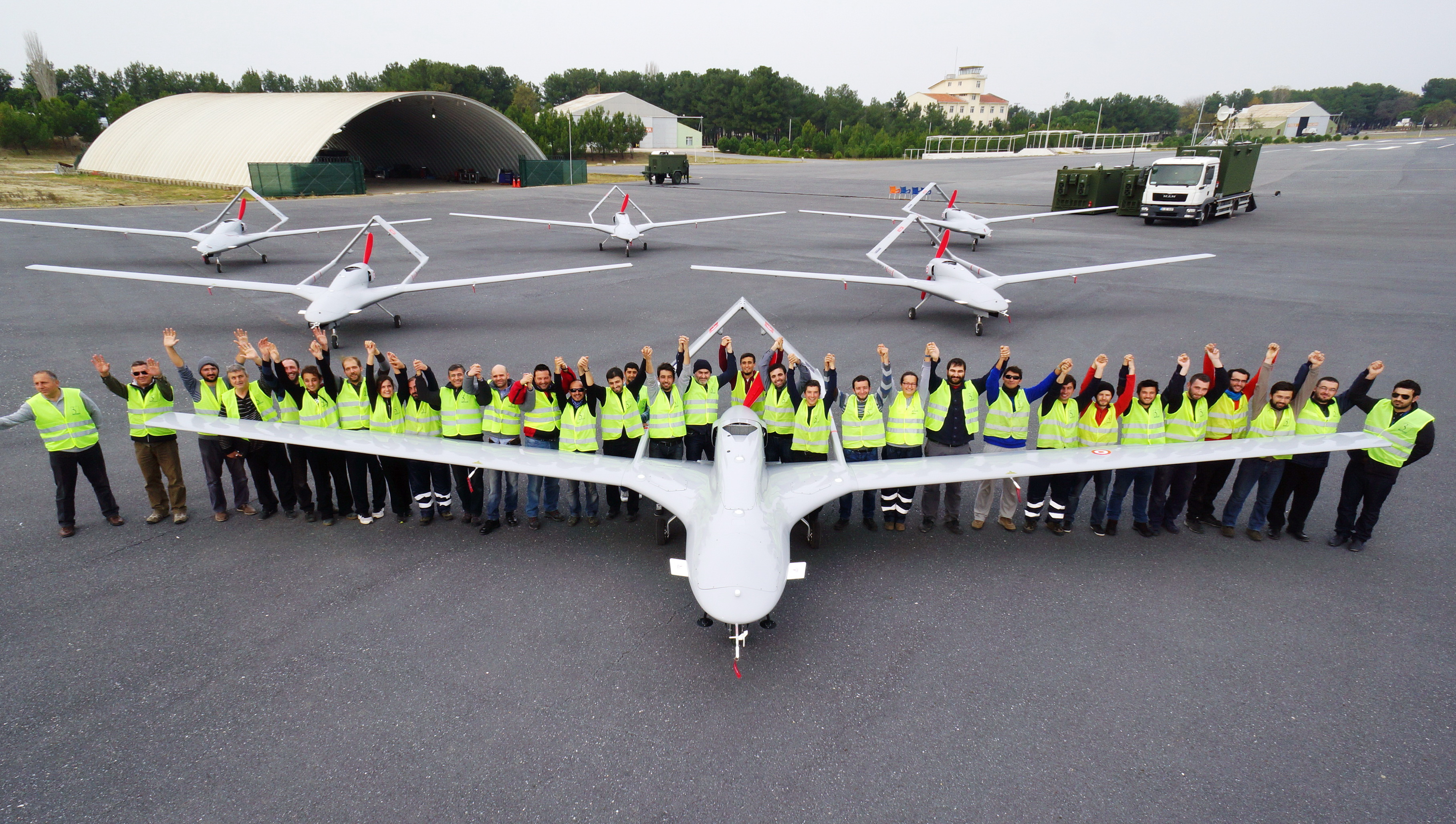
Baykar UAV Team

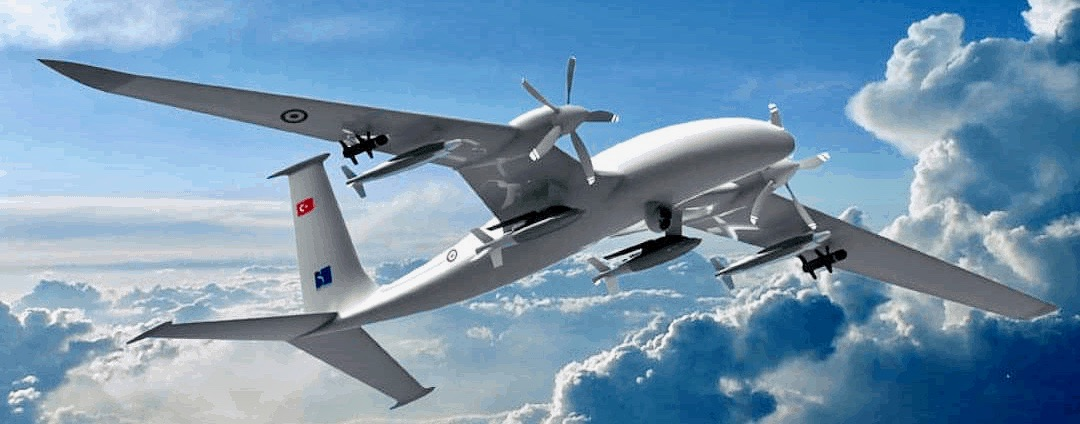
Bayraktar Akıncı UCAV

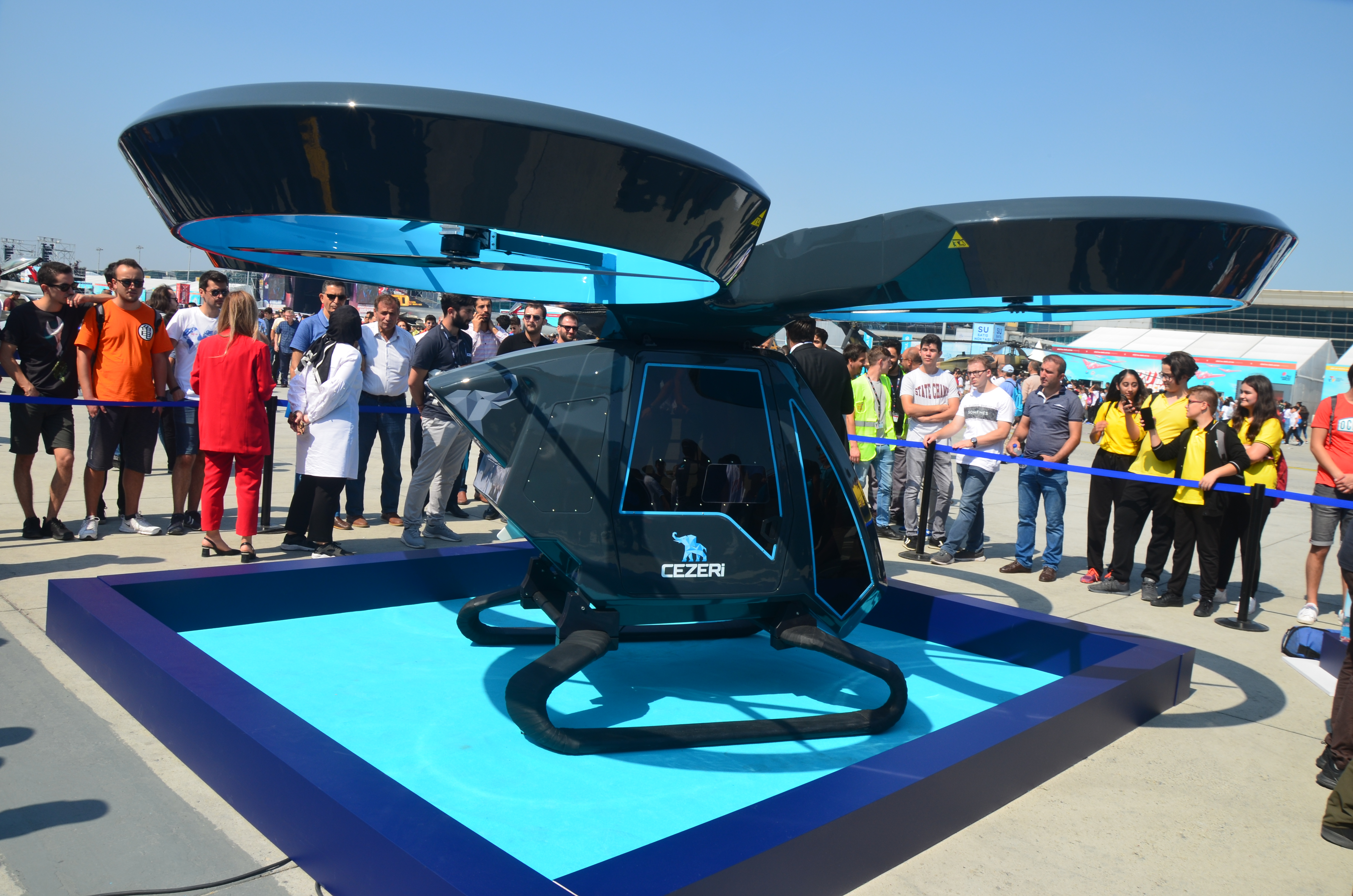
Baykar Cezeri quadrocopter
