= Efes exercise =

Turkish military exercise

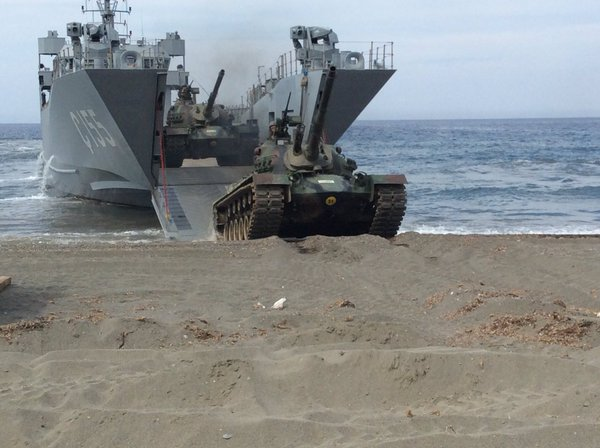
Amphibious assault drill during EFES 2016

The Efes exercise (also EFES) is a biennial military exercise of the military of Turkey, often involving the Doğanbey Exercise Area, Seferihisar, Izmir Province, Turkey.

It was named after the ancient city of Ephesus. The exercise includes computer-assisted and live-fire phases, and is used to test and showcase new weapons systems and arms industry technologies with international participation.

== 2010 ==
Bayraktar Mini, developed since 2004 and became operational in 2007, was first presented to the general public during Efes-2010. Also, TAI Gözcü UAV used for tactical reconnaissance purposes, were presented at a military exercise for the first time. In addition, the world's first holographic map was presented: three-dimensional geographical information is recorder onto a special 0.2 mm thick film using lasers, to be used by aerial, naval, and land units.

== 2022 ==
The first phase, computer-aided scenarios, lasted until May 20, after which live fire exercises started. The Multinational Combined Joint Live-Fire Exercise was carried out between 31 May and 9 June 2022 in Doğanbey.

== 2024 ==
The EFES-2024 exercise was conducted during April 25 - May 30. The exercise began with a Computer-Assisted Command Post Exercise from April 25 to May 8, followed by a Live-Firing Field Exercise at Doğanbey. During the exercise 33 weapons systems were tested for the first time, including FIRTINA-2 155 mm KMT, BORAN 105 mm Light Howitzer, PARS 4x4 STA ATGM Vehicle, AMMTS 8x8 Clearance Vehicle, MİLKAR series electronic attack systems, SURALP Weapon Radar, ASELSAN SERHAT Air Detection Radar, İHTAR Soft-Kill C-UAS System, ACAR UAS Detection Radar, and inflatable tank traps.

== 2026 ==
The Efes-2026 Exercise was conducted as a combined, joint, and live-fire exercise between April 11 and May 21, 2026 (Computer-Assisted Phase: April 11-17, 2026, Live-fire Phase: April 20 - May 21, 2026) in Istanbul and Izmir, with the presence of 45 countries. In addition, during May 16-21, 2026 an exhibition of the arms industry took place in the Doğanbey Exercise Area. 50 new weapons systems were presented, including autonomous drone swarms, its Steel Dome layered air defence architecture, and carrier-launched UCAVs.
