= Baykar Cezeri =

Turkish experimental UAV

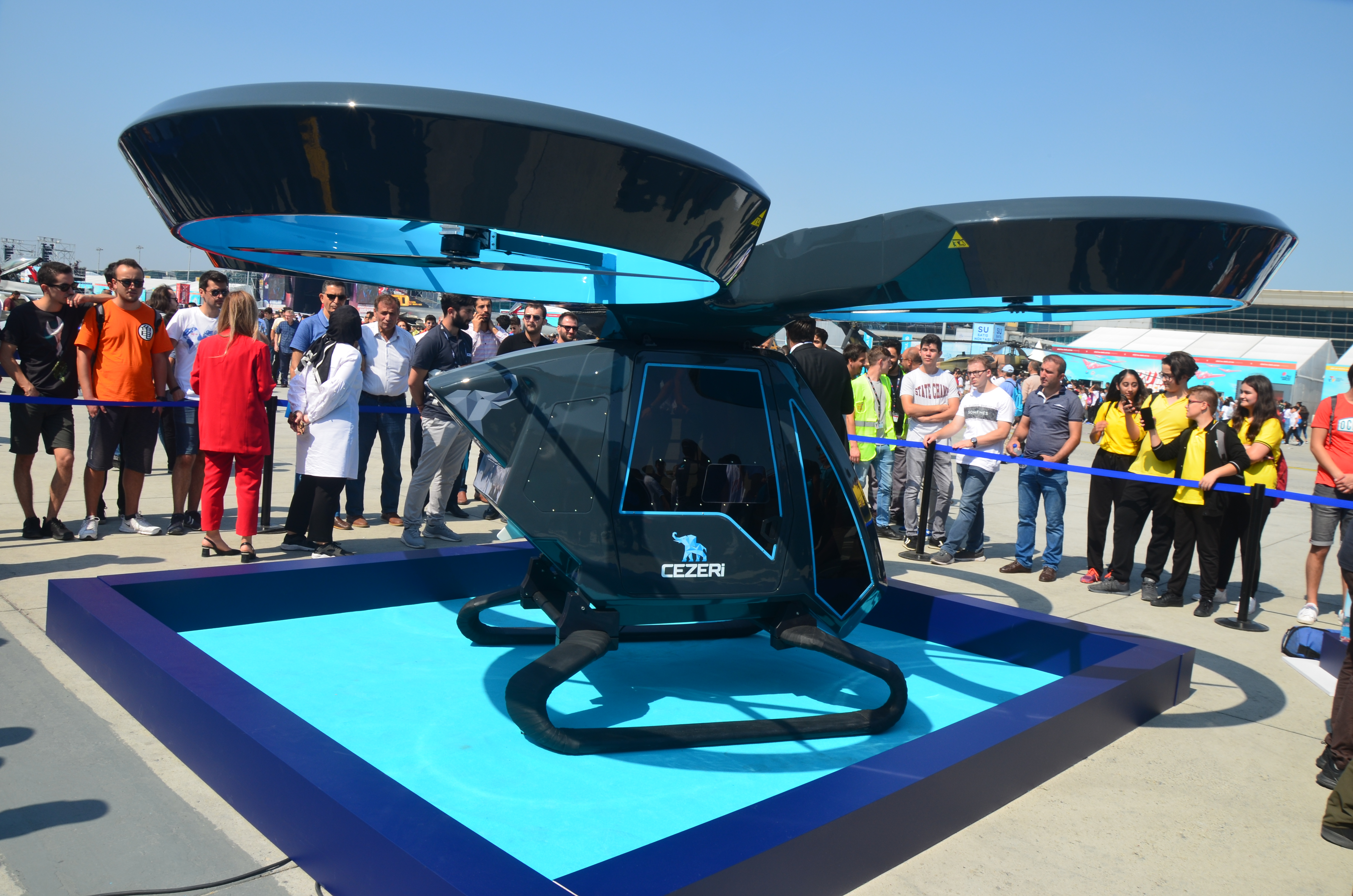
Prototype of quadrocopter Cezeri at 2019 Teknofest Istanbul.

Cezeri is a quadcopter developed by Baykar Unmanned Aerial Vehicle Systems Co. in Turkey. It was named after Ismail al-Jazari (1136–1206), a Muslim polymath: a scholar, inventor, mechanical engineer, artisan and artist from Jazira in Mesopotamia. The 230 kg (510 lb) heavy prototype made the autonomous maiden flight midnight of September 2020, about one year after its introduction to the public at the 2019 Teknofest Istanbul.

== Autonomous maiden flight ==
The initial test flights of the quadcopter took place on 11 September 2020. The first autonomous flights were made tied to the ground with ropes for safety reasons. The next two flight tests were conducted in untied free flight on 14 September 2020. All the autonomous flight tests were successful. The vehicle climbed to a height of 10 m (33 ft).

== Characteristics ==
Cezeri takes off and lands vertical. Its dimensions are 3.73 m × 4.07 m × 1.87 m (12.2 ft × 13.4 ft × 6.1 ft). The maximum take-off weight is 241 kg (531 lb). It is powered by eight rechargeable electric batteries and propelled by eight brushless DC electric motors. It has three backup smart flight control systems. It is planned that the vehicle will have an average service speed of 70–80 km/h (43–50 mph) with maximum 100 km/h (62 mph), and a maximum ceiling at 2,000 m (6,600 ft). The endurance is expected to be about one hour after the advance of the battery technology.

The vehicle was designed to be used in the urban aerial transportation for persons and cargo. The realization of its use in a populated urban environment can take 10–15 years while its use like a recreational vehicle in rural areas can be possible within 3–4 years as stated.
