= Bayraktar Mini =

Turkish miniature unmanned aerial vehicle

Bayraktar Mini UAV
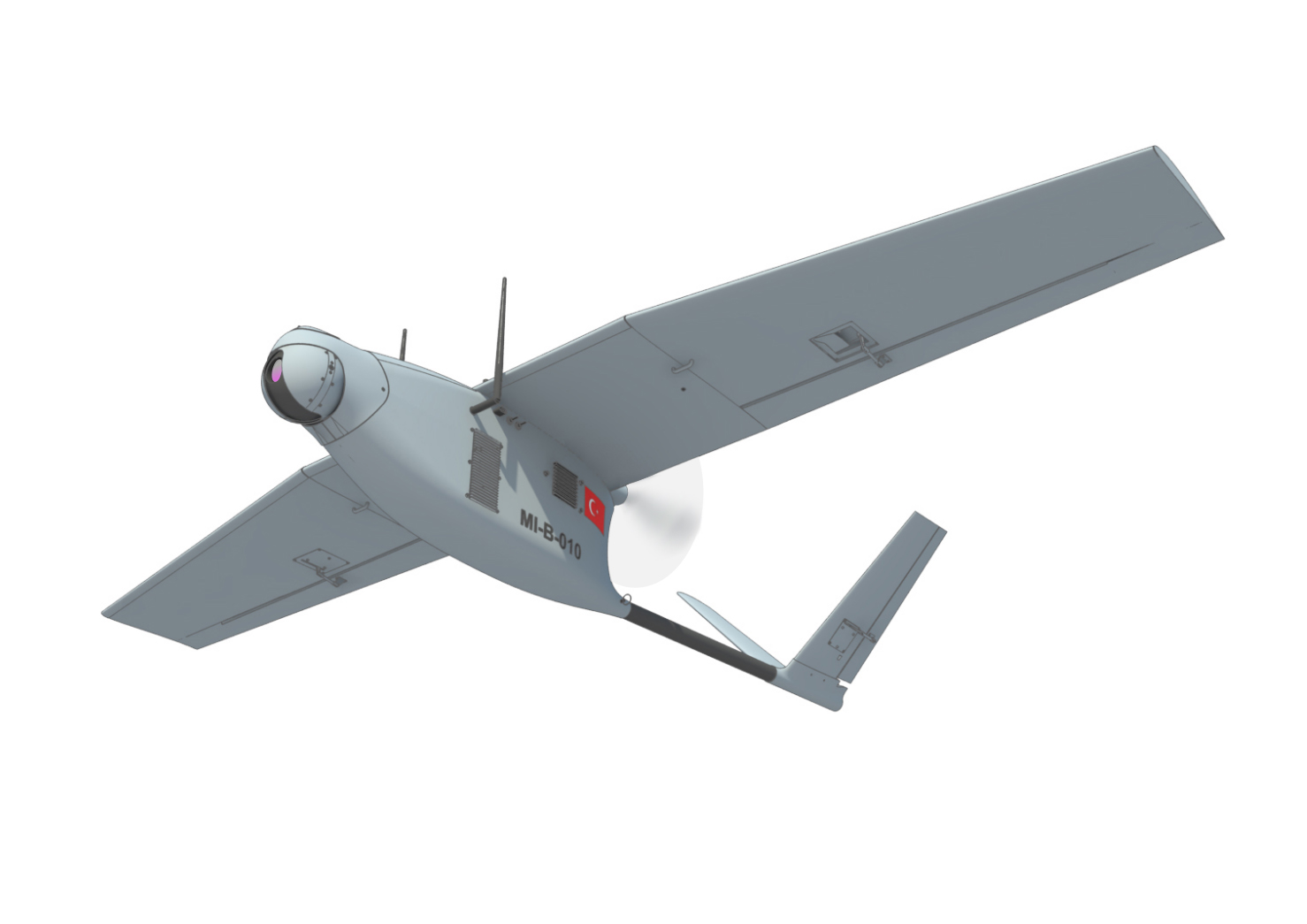
- Artist impression

General information
- Type: Miniature UAV
- National origin: Turkey
- Manufacturer: Baykar
- Status: Active since December 2007
- Primary user: Turkish Armed Forces
- Number built: 500+

History
- Manufactured: 2005
- First flight: October 2006

The Bayraktar Mini UAV is a miniature UAV produced by the Turkish company Baykar.

== Development ==
System design activities started in 2004 with the concept of short range day and night aerial reconnaissance and surveillance applications. The initial prototype, Bayraktar A, was developed in 2005, and following successful autonomous flight demonstrations, Baykar received a contract to begin serial production. The first batch of the order by the Turkish Armed Forces was composed of 19 aircraft which were mainly deployed to the southeast parts of Turkey to be used in counterterrorism operations. After hundreds of hours flight trials and feedback, the system was subjected to major modifications and a superior version began development. The Bayraktar B Mini UAV System was completed and became operational in December 2007 to be operated by the Turkish Armed Forces. It was first presented to the general public in 2010, during the Efes exercise.

Due to its success in the region, the system was also awarded with an export deal to the Qatar Armed Forces in 2012. The development of the aircraft is being continued. According to the company, the most recent version, the Bayraktar MINI UAV D, has 2 times greater communication range and 3 times higher maximum altitude compared to its predecessors.

== Overview ==
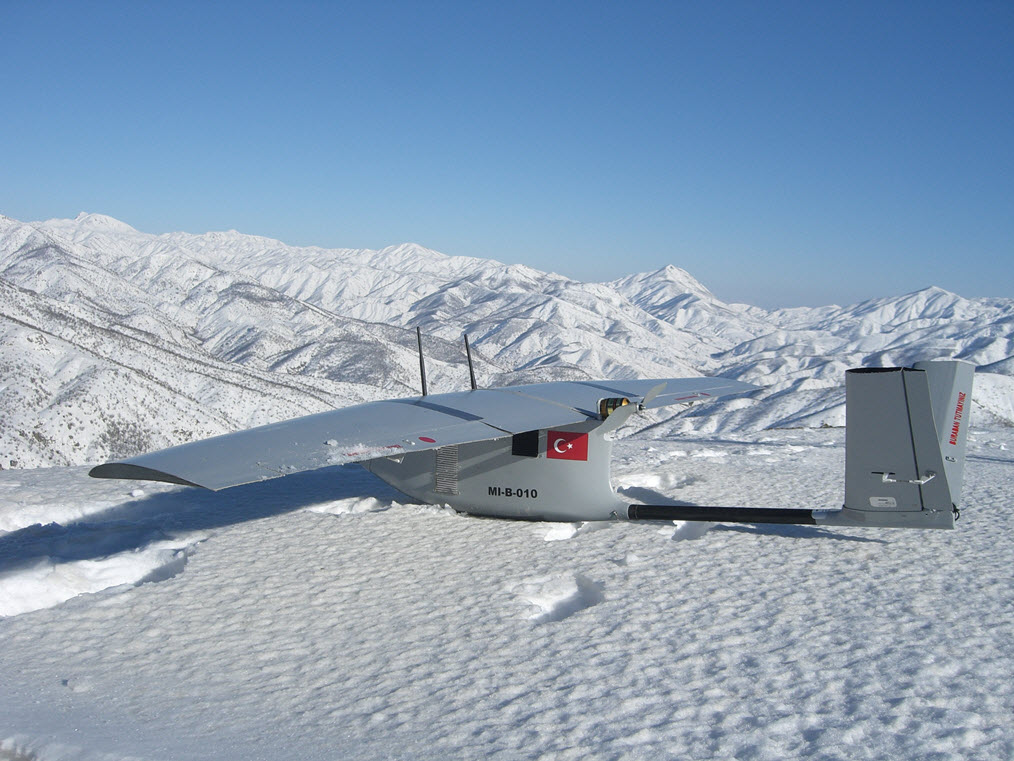
Bayraktar Mini UAV

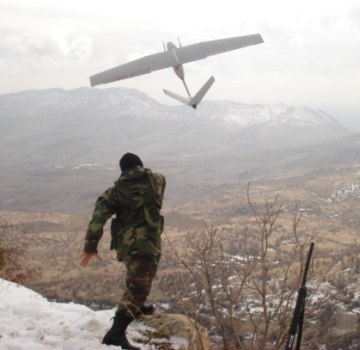
Bayraktar is launched by a soldier

Bayraktar B is a portable UAV system, designed to operate under harsh geographic and meteorological conditions. Bayraktar B is fielded with small army units, and as of 2021 have recorded more than 100,000 flight hours.

The main features of the Bayraktar B are:

- Automatic waypoint navigation
- Secure digital communication
- Home return and automatic parachute landing in case of lost communication
- Smart battery management system
- Remote-range command/control and monitor (WAN Relay)
- Ground control switching
- Automatic take off
- Automatic cruising
- Automatic belly landing / parachute deployment
- Joystick assisted semi-automatic control
- Automatic stall control in case of electric motor dysfunction
- Automatic spin control in case of very harsh wind conditions
- Real-time Google Earth integration (display of telemetry data, routes etc. in real-time)
- On-screen video display
- Target coordinate estimation with an accuracy of within 10 meters
- Automatic tracking antenna system
- Enhancing Situational Awareness by FLIR's Tau Core

== Operators ==
=== Confirmed Operators Of Bayraktar Mini UAV ===
- Turkey [2007]
  - Turkish Armed Forces
- Qatar [2012]
  - Army
- Libya [2020]
  - Army
- Ukraine [2022]
  - Army

== Specifications ==
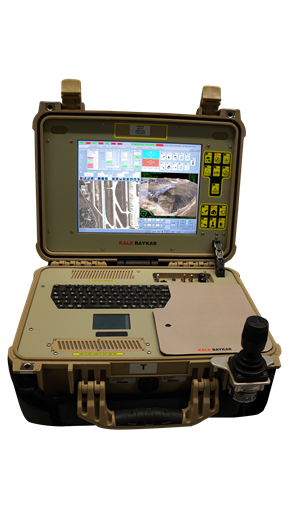
Portable flight terminal

Specification	Bayraktar A	Bayraktar B	Notes	Ref
Length	1.2 m (3 ft 11 in)	1.2 m (3 ft 11 in)		
Wing Span	1.6 m (5 ft 3 in)	1.9 m (6 ft 3 in)		
Weight	3.5 kg (7.7 lb)	4.5 kg (9.9 lb)		
Power / Source	Electric / Battery	Electric / Battery		
Take Off	Hand Launch	Hand Launch		
Landing	Over Fuselage	Over Fuselage		
Communication Range	10 km (6.2 mi)	15 km (9.3 mi) With Auto Tracking Antenna System		
Endurance	> 60 minutes	> 60 minutes (with 1000 meters operational Altitude)		
Operational Altitude	1,000 ft (300 m)	3,000 ft (910 m)		
Maximum Altitude	12,000 ft (3,700 m)	12,000 ft (3,700 m)		
Cruise Speed	70 km/h (43 mph)	110 km/h (68 mph)		
Payload 1	CCD Camera (Fixed Mount)	CCD Camera (Tilt Axis Movement)	CCD Camera (2 Axis Movement)	
Payload 2	Thermal Camera (Fixed Mount)	Thermal Camera (Tilt Axis Movement)	Thermal Camera (2 Axis Movement)	
Structure	Composite material	Composite material		
Operating Crew	2	2		
