= Teknofest =

Largest aviation, aerospace, and technology festival in the world

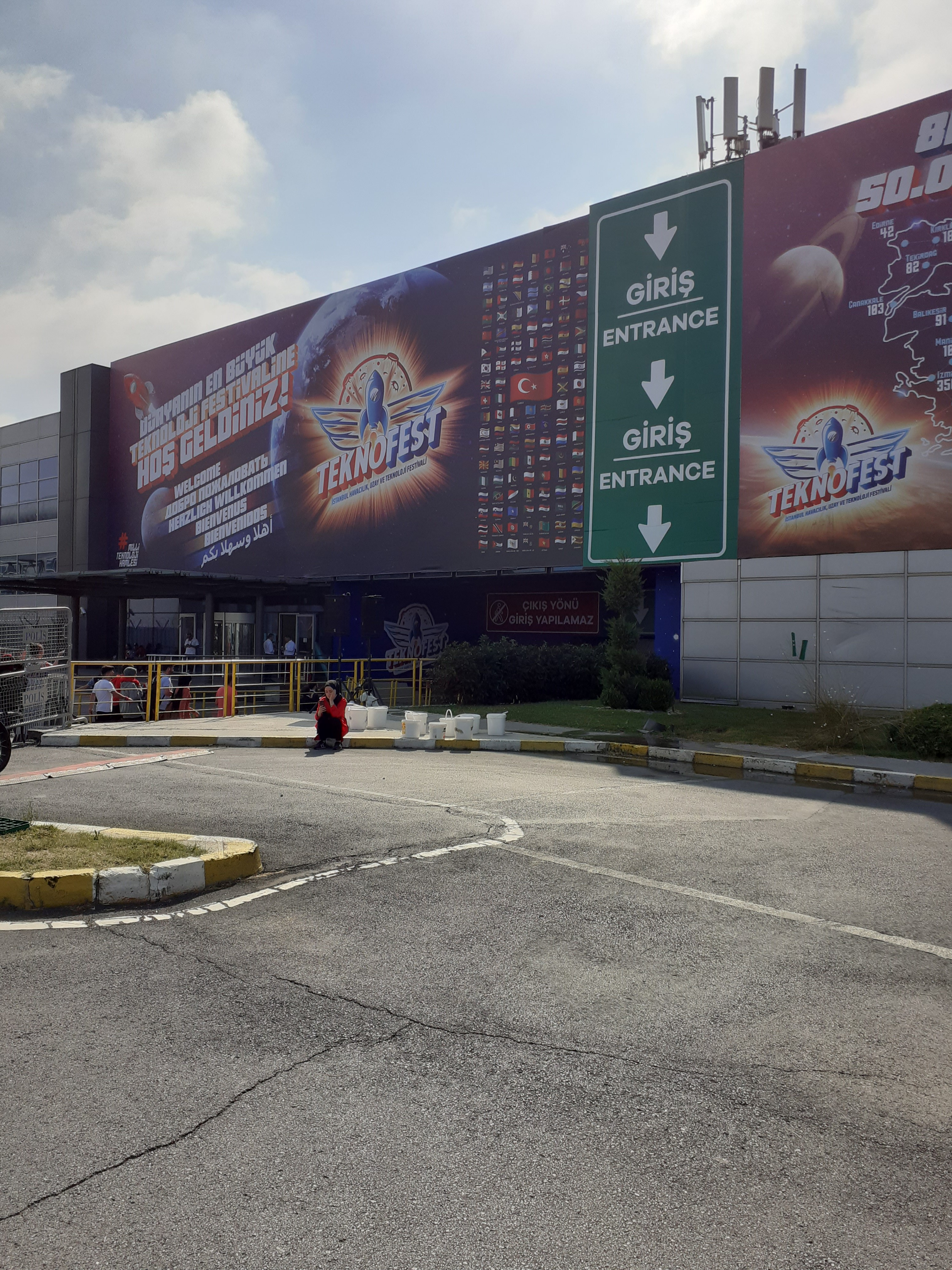
- Entrance to Teknofest 2019 at Istanbul Atatürk Airport.
- Status: Active
- Genre: Festival (aviation, space and technology, air show)
- Frequency: Annually
- Venue: Istanbul Atatürk Airport
- Location: Istanbul
- Country: Turkey
- Inaugurated: 2018
- Founder: Türkiye Teknoloji Takımı (Technology Team of Turkey)
- Website: www.teknofest.org

Teknofest, short for Teknofest Aerospace and Technology Festival, is the largest aviation, aerospace, and technology festival in the world, taking place in Turkey. It was first held at Istanbul Airport in September 2018 by the Turkish Technology Team Foundation (T3) in collaboration with private companies, ministries, and academic institutions. The primary goals of the festival are to raise public awareness about technology in society and to draw attention to the importance of national production.

The Festival is filled with seminars, technology competitions, exhibitions of domestic technology enterprises, Take Off international startup summit. Visitors also can enjoy numerous attractions, such as aviation demonstrations including parachuting, air shows of "Solo Turk", "Turkish Stars", and many international aerobatic teams.

Technology competitions are organized in 12 different categories. People of all ages from primary school students to entrepreneurs can take part in the competitions with their projects and also benefit from the technical equipment support.

For the contest "The HackIstanbul 2018 Capture the Flag", organized in cooperation with the European Skills, Competences, Qualifications and Occupations (ECSO) and Romanian government, computer hackers from all over the world competed. Winners were awarded money.

Another award-winning competition is the "World Drone Cup" race.

== 2018 ==
At the festival, 14 different technology competitions were held at the Istanbul Airport on September 20-23. About 80,000 people registered for the festival in the first year. Within the scope of the festival, leading Turkish defense and technology institutions and organizations such as Aselsan, Baykar, İGA, Isbak, Roketsan, TUSAŞ, Turkish Airlines, TÜBİTAK and TÜRKSAT organized competitions in different categories. F-16 Solo Türk, Challenger 605, Aston Martin The New Vantage, Tesla P100DL, Lotus Evora 430 GT, Redbull Racing F1, Kawasaki H2R races were also organized. During the festival, Rocket competition in Konya Salt Lake, Vertical Wind Tunnel Program in Taksim Square, Travel Hackathon, Hack Istanbul 2018, World Drone Cup, Take-Off International Startup Summit.

=== Competitions ===
Year	Level	Competition
2018	High School, Undergraduate and Graduate	Satellite Model Competition; Fighter UAV Competition; Efficiency Challenge / Robotaxi Competition; Artificial Intelligence Competition; Swarm UAV Simulation Competition; UAV Supported Unmanned Land Vehicle; Technologies for Humanity Competition; Rocket Competition; Robotics Fetih 1453 Competition; Unmanned Underwater Systems Competition; Unmanned Aerial Vehicle Competition

== 2019 ==
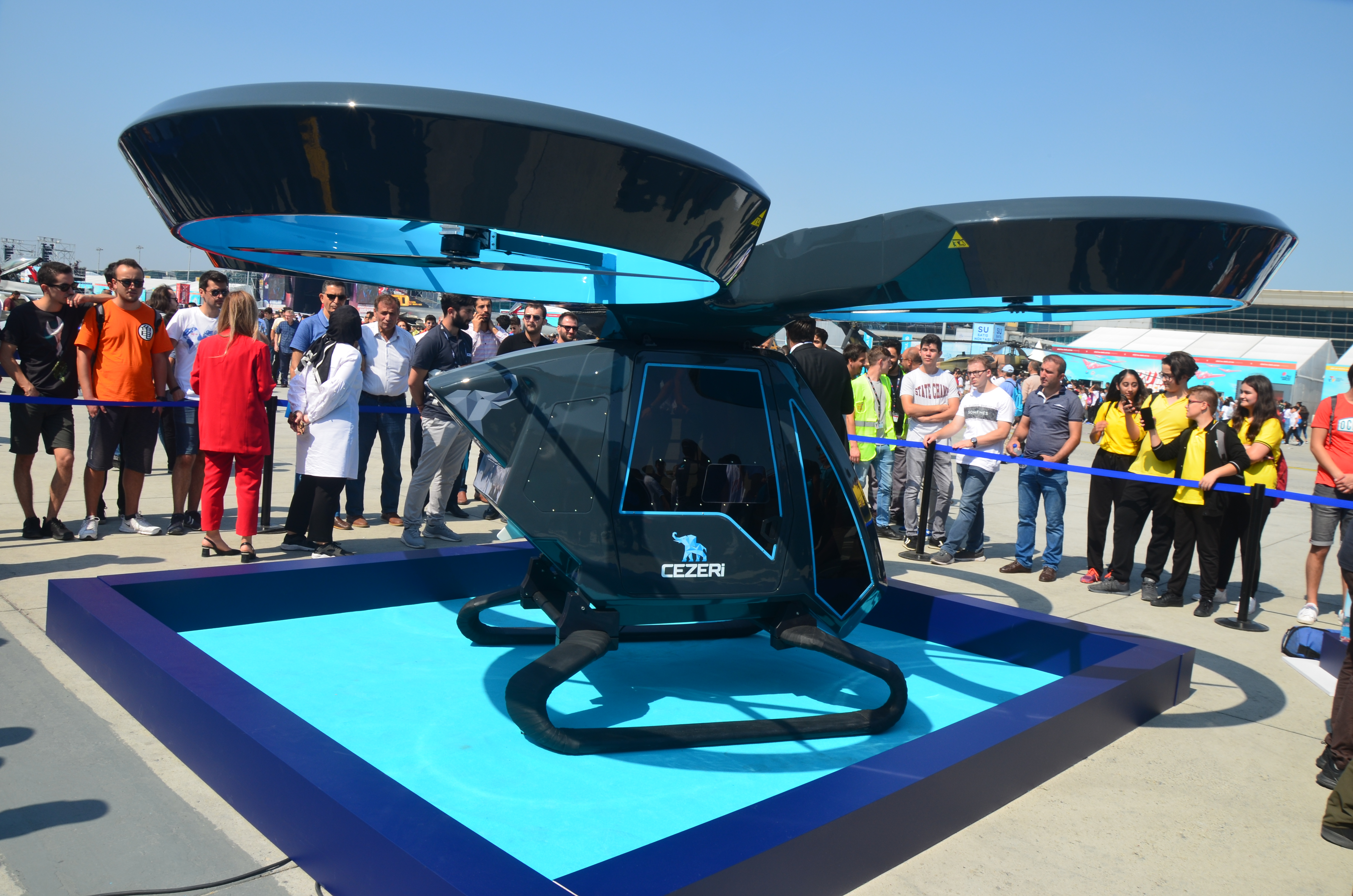
Quadrotor helicopter Baykar Cezeri at Teknofest 2019

The festival was held on September 17-22, 2019 at Istanbul Atatürk International Airport. During the Teknofest, 17373 teams participated in the competitions. The total participation in the festival was recorded as 1 million 750 thousand people with competitors and visitors. Turkey's first flying car prototype "Cezeri" was exhibited for the first time. Russian Sukhoi Su-35 fighter jet taxi and Medium-haul passenger plane MC-21 were also shown at the festival. Other showcased jets were the multi-purpose fighter jet Su-35, Su-57 fighter jet, the latest generation Russian stealth aircraft, and the multipurpose amphibious Beriev Be-200. Unlike 2018, many new events were organized this year thanks to the festival’s huge success such as Flying Car Design Competition, Mini Jet Radial Compressor Design Competition, Turbo Fan Engine Design Competition, robotic competitions, Istanbul International Debate Fair, and TÜBİTAK University Students Research Project Competitions.

=== Competitions ===
Year	Level	Competition
2019	Primary, Middle, High School and Higher Education	Smart Places Hackathon Competition; Technologies for Humanity Competition; Flying Car Design Competition
2019	High School, Undergraduate and Graduate	Unmanned Underwater Systems Competition; Rocket Competition; Robotics Competitions; Fighter UAV Competition; Artificial Intelligence Competition
2019	Undergraduate and Graduate	Efficiency Challenge; Robotaxi Competition; Unmanned Aerial Vehicle Competition; Satellite Model Competition; Mini Jet Radial Compressor Design Competition; Turbofan Motor Design Competition; Swarm UAV Simulation Competition

== 2020 ==
The festival was held in 21 different technology categories in Gaziantep on September 17, 2020. Comprehensive competitions that touch every aspect of life from health to agriculture and the environment, covering not only the defense industry but all civilian areas were organized. Biotechnology Innovation Competition, Agricultural Technologies Competition, Environment, and Energy Technologies Competition, Intelligent Transportation Competition, Educational Technology Competition, Helicopter Design Competition, and Jet Engine Design Competition were the competition categories added to the festival. The number of stakeholders also increased to 63 at the festival held in 2020. The festival, which is planned to be held in April, was postponed to September due to the pandemic. Only contestants were able to attend the festival. Approximately 20,000 teams and 100,000 young people from 84 countries applied to participate in the Teknofest competitions.

=== Competitions ===
Year	Level	Competition
2020	Primary and Middle School	Technology For Humanıty; Flying Car Design Competition; Educational Technologies Competition; Environment and Energy Technologies Competition; Smart Transportation Competition; World Drone Cup; Hack Zeugma
2020	High school	Technology For Humanıty; Educational Technologies Competition; Environment and Energy Technologies Competition; Smart Transportation Competition; Helıcopter Design Competition; Flying Car Design Competition; Unmanned Underwater Systems Competition; Rocket Competition; Robotics Competition; Robotaxi-Full Scale Autonomous Vehicle Competition; Agricultural Technologies Competition; Biotechnology Innovation Competition; World Drone Cup; Hack Zeugma
2020	Undergraduate, Graduate and Postgraduate	Technology For Humanıty; Environment and Energy Technologies Competition; Flying Car Design Competition; Educational Technologies Competition; Smart Transportation Competition; Hack Zeugma; World Drone Cup; Unmanned Underwater Systems Competition; Rocket Competition; Robotaxi-Full Scale Autonomous Vehicle Competition; Agricultural Technologies Competition; Biotechnology Innovation Competition; Efficiency Challenge Electric Vehicle; Unmanned Aerial Vehicle Competition; Unıversity Students Research Projects Competitions; Model Satellite Competition; Jet Motor Design Competition; Swarm Uav Competition; Helicopter Design Competition; Travel Hackhaton

== 2021 ==
The festival was planned to be held in Istanbul between September 21-26. The newest competition categories were added to the festival to be held this year in areas such as simulation, artificial intelligence, and unmanned aerial vehicles. Over 5 million TL of material support will be provided to teams who pass the pre-selection stage. Winner teams will receive a total of over 5 million TL in prizes.

=== Competitions ===
Year	Level	Competition
2021	Primary and Middle School	Technology For Humanity Competition; Education Technologies Competition; Smart Transportation Competition; Hack Istanbul; Robotics Competition
2021	High school	Smart Transportation Competition; Biotechnology Innovation Competition; Environment And Energy Technologies Competition; Digital Technologies Competition In Industry; Education Technologies Competition; Hack Istanbul; Technology For Humanity Competition; Unmanned Underwater Systems Competition; Culture And Tourism Technologies Competition; Robotaxı-Full Scale Autonomous Vehicle Competition; Robotics Competitions; Rocket Competition; Agricultural Technologies Competition; Turkish Natural Language Processing Competition; Flying Car Design Competition; World Drone Cup; Artificial Intelligence Competition; Fighting Unmanned Aerial Vehicle Competition; Agricultural Unmanned Land Vehicle Competition; Mixed Swarm Simulation Competition
2021	Undergraduate, Graduate and Postgraduate	Smart Transportation Competition; Biotechnology Innovation Competition; Environment and Energy Technologies Competition; Digital Technologies in Industry; Efficiency Challenge Electric Vehicle Races; Educational Technologies Competition; Hack Istanbul; Helicopter Design Competition; Communication Technologies Competition; Technology For Humanıty; International Unmanned Aerial Vehicle Competition; Unmanned Underwater Systems Competition; Jet Engine Design Competition; Mixed Herd Simulation Competition; Culture and Tourism Technologies Competition; Model Satellite Competition; Robotaxı-Full Scale Autonomous Vehıcle Competition; Robotics Competitions; Rocket Competition; Fighting UAV Competition; UAV Swarm Competition; Agricultural Technologies Competition; Agricultural Unmanned Land Vehicle Competition; Travel Hackathon; Turkish Natural Language Processing Competition; Turkey Drone Championship; Flying Car Design Competition; World Drone Cup; Artificial Intelligence in Transportation Competition

== Subsequent editions ==
=== 2022 ===
The festival was first held in Baku at the Crystal Hall from 26–29 May 2022. It was later held at Samsun-Çarşamba Airport from 30 August to 4 September.

=== 2023 ===
It was announced that the festival would be held in three different cities in the 100th year of the Republic's founding. The first took place from 27 April to 1 May at the apron of Atatürk Airport in Istanbul, as in 2019 and 2021. The second was held at Etimesgut Air Base in Ankara from 30 August to 3 September 2023. The third was held at Çiğli Air Base in Izmir from 27 September to 1 October.

=== 2024 ===
In its seventh year, TEKNOFEST was held from 2–6 October 2024 at the now-defunct Adana Şakirpaşa Airport.

=== 2025 ===
The first leg of the festival took place in the old terminal building of Ercan International Airport from 1–4 May 2025. The second leg, themed Maritime and Underwater Technologies, was held under the name ‘Teknofest Mavi Vatan’ at the Istanbul Naval Shipyard Command from 30–31 August 2025. The third leg took place at Atatürk Airport from 17–21 September 2025.

=== 2026 ===
TEKNOFEST was held under the Mavi Vatan theme at Gölcük Naval Shipyard Command from 20–23 August.

== Attendance ==
In 2018, the first year of Teknofest, 4,333 teams made applications. In 2019, 10,288 teams applied to Teknofest, which has become the world's largest aviation and space festival. It received 1,720,000 participants in total. Despite the epidemic in 2020, a significant increase was observed in the number of applications with 16,034 teams. Applications received in 2021 broke a new record with a total of 36,984 teams.

There were 12 different competition categories in the festival held in 2018. In the first year of the festival, around 80,000 people registered and welcomed 500,000 visitors. In 2019, more than 50,000 contestants from 122 countries participated in the festival in 19 different categories. The festival was not open to visitors in 2020 due to Covid-19. Despite this, it received applications from more than 100,000 people in 23 categories. In 2021, the number of competition categories was increased to 34.
