= Artyom Shneyerov =

Canadian economist

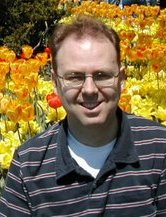
- Born: St. Petersburg, Russia
- Died: October 24, 2017 (aged 49)
- Education: Northwestern University (Ph.D.); Vanderbilt University (M.A.); St. Petersburg Polytechnical University (B.S.)
- Known for: Game theory; Industrial organization; Econometrics
- Scientific career
- Fields: Economist
- Workplaces: Concordia University (Montreal, Quebec, Canada)

Artyom Shneyerov (died October 24, 2017) was a microeconomist working at Concordia University in Montreal, Quebec, Canada. He was also an associate editor of the International Journal of Industrial Organization from 2009 until his death in 2017. His research is in the fields of game theory, industrial organization and applied econometrics.

In his paper "An empirical study of auction revenue rankings: the case of municipal bonds", he introduced an approach for the estimation of counterfactual revenues in a common value auction without the need to identify model primitives. He showed that for any given reserve price, equilibrium bids from first-price auctions can be used to identify the expected revenues in Vickrey auction with the same reserve price. In addition, he derived an explicit bound on expected revenue for English auctions. His approach is based on the revenue ranking theorem of Milgrom and Weber. He has applied these results to municipal bond auctions in California.

Jointly with Mark Satterthwaite, and his former student Adam Chi Leung Wong, obtained a number of results about the structure of equilibria of dynamic matching and bargaining games and their convergence to perfect competition . These games are often used to provide a foundation for the perfect competition hypothesis, one of the basic concepts in economics. They are also used frequently in search models of labor economics. Most dynamic matching and bargaining models in the previous literature assumed full information. This means that in a given meeting, the buyer knows the minimum the seller is willing to accept for the item, and the seller knows the maximum the buyer is willing to pay. This assumption is often violated in reality. Satterthwaite and Shneyerov have shown that the dynamic matching and bargaining market is nevertheless approximately competitive as the time between matches becomes progressively smaller.

Shneyerov also did early work on the measurement of income inequality. In "Path Independent Inequality Measures", he and James Foster introduced inequality measures that are decomposable into within and between group components. These measures have been recently applied more broadly than income inequality, e.g. to selection into and across lending contracts in Thailand.

Shneyerov died of a heart attack in October 2017.
