= WNYC (disambiguation) =

WNYC is a service brand operated by New York Public Radio.

It may also refer to:

- WNYC (AM) - radio station (820 AM) licensed to New York City
- WNYC-FM - radio station (93.9 FM) licensed to New York City
- WPXN-TV - television station (channel 31) licensed to New York City, which held the WNYC-TV call sign from 1962 until 1996
