= New Sounds: A Listener's Guide to New Music =

1987 book by John Schaefer

- Author: John Schaefer
- Language: English
- Genre: Music
- Publisher: Harper & Row
- Publication date: 1987
- Publication place: United States
- ISBN: 0060970812

New Sounds: A Listener's Guide to New Music is a 1987 book written by radio show host John Schaefer. It is a guide that covers a range of subjects and genres relating to music. It has been referenced by many other books relating to the subjects and aspects of music.

== Background ==
Schaefer discusses the categories of music. Discographies of the artists covered in the categories are provided. Dick Weissman referred to it as a "rich guide to many musical styles" in his book, The Music Business: Career Opportunities and Self-Defense.

Authors such as Leigh Landy with Experimental Music Notebooks, Karin Pendle and Melinda Boyd with their book Women in Music: A Research and Information Guide, and Jeremy Grimshaw with Draw a Straight Line and Follow It: The Music and Mysticism of La Monte Young have drawn on it.

Its original publication ISBN 0060970812 was by Harper & Row in 1987.

== Artists and composers covered ==
Joseph Schwantner, Brian Eno, Laurie Anderson and Frank Zappa are looked at.

== About the author ==
Schaefer is currently the host of culture and talk show Soundcheck which is broadcast on Radio WNYC. He also hosts New Sounds, a radio program. He has produced New Sounds since 1982 and Soundcheck from its beginning in 2002.
