= WNYC-FM =

Public radio station in New York City

- New York, New York; United States
- Frequency: 93.9 MHz (HD Radio)
- Branding: WNYC 93.9 FM

Programming
- Language: English
- Format: News/talk (public)
- Subchannels: HD2: Simulcast of WQXR-FM (classical)
- Affiliations: NPR

Ownership
- Owner: New York Public Radio
- Sister stations: WNYC; WQXR-FM; WQXW; New Jersey Public Radio

History
- First air date: March 13, 1943
- Former call signs: W39NY (1941-1943)
- Call sign meaning: New York City

Technical information
- Licensing authority: FCC
- Facility ID: 73355
- Class: B
- ERP: 5,200 watts (analog); 315 watts (digital)
- HAAT: 415 meters (1,362 ft)
- Transmitter coordinates: 40°44′54.4″N 73°59′8.5″W

Links
- Public license information: Public file; LMS
- Webcast: Listen live (via iHeartRadio)
- Website: www.wnyc.org

WNYC-FM (93.9 MHz) is a non-commercial public radio station, licensed to New York, New York. It, along with WNYC (AM), is one of the primary outlets for WNYC branded programming provided by the non-profit New York Public Radio (NYPR).

== History ==
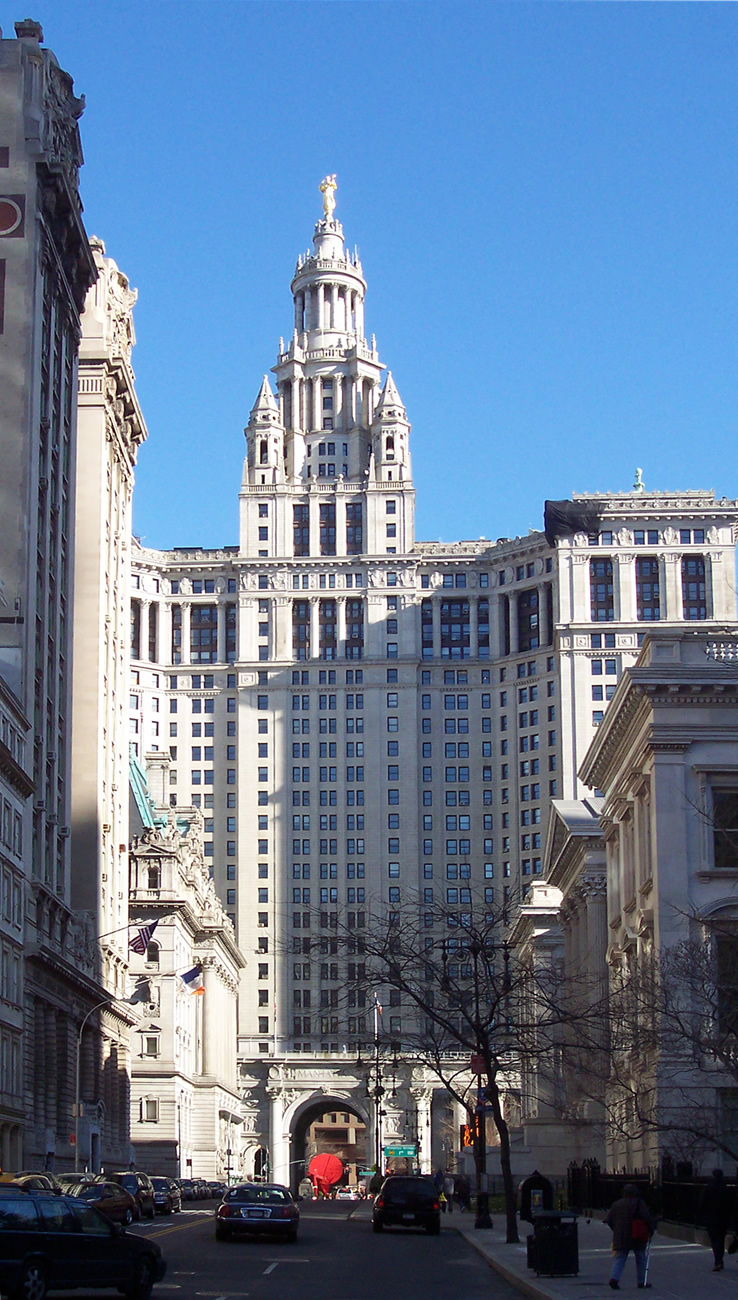
Manhattan Municipal Building, WNYC's home from 1922 to 2008

=== Early years (1943–1994) ===
WNYC-FM began regularly scheduled broadcasts on the FM band as W39NY on March 13, 1943, at 43.9 MHz, operating as the sister station to WNYC (AM). The station changed call letters to WNYC-FM later that year, and moved to 95.3 MHz in 1946, before settling on 93.9 MHz the next year.

The Municipal Broadcasting System (which was renamed the WNYC Communications Group in 1989) helped to form NPR in 1971, and the WNYC stations were among the 90 stations that carried the inaugural broadcast of All Things Considered later that year.

The station's ownership by the City meant that it was occasionally subject to the whims of various mayors. As part of a crackdown on prostitution in 1979, then-Mayor Ed Koch tried to use WNYC to broadcast the names of "johns" arrested for soliciting. Announcers threatened a walkout and station management refused to comply with the idea; after one broadcast the idea was abandoned. See John Hour.

=== Independence from the City (1994–present) ===
Shortly after assuming the mayoralty in 1994, Rudolph W. Giuliani announced he was considering selling WNYC-AM-FM. Giuliani believed that broadcasting was no longer essential as a municipal service, and that the financial compensation from selling the stations could be used to help the City cover budget shortfalls. The final decision was made in March 1995: while the City opted to divest WNYC-TV (now WPXN-TV) through a blind auction to commercial buyers, WNYC-AM-FM was sold to the WNYC Foundation for $20 million over a six-year period, far less than what the stations could have been sold for if they were placed on the open market. While the sale put an end to the occasional political intrusions of the past, it required the WNYC Foundation to embark on a major appeal towards listeners, other foundations, and private benefactors. The station's audience and budget have continued to grow since the split from the city.

The terrorist attacks of September 11, 2001 destroyed WNYC-FM's transmitter atop the World Trade Center. WNYC-AM-FM's studios, in the nearby Manhattan Municipal Building, had to be evacuated and station staff was unable to return to its offices for three weeks. The FM signal was knocked off the air for a time. WNYC-FM temporarily moved to studios at National Public Radio's New York bureau in midtown Manhattan, where it broadcast on its still operating AM signal transmitting from towers in Kearny, New Jersey, and by a live Internet stream. The stations eventually returned to the Municipal Building.

=== Move to new studios (2008) ===
On June 16, 2008, New York Public Radio (NYPR) moved from its 51,400 square feet (4,780 m^{2}) of rent-free space scattered on eight floors of the Manhattan Municipal Building to a new location on Varick Street, near the Holland Tunnel. The station now occupies three and a half floors of a 12-story former printing building. The new offices have 12-foot (4 m) ceilings and 71,900 square feet (6,680 m^{2}) of space. The number of recording studios and booths has doubled, to 31. There is a new 140-seat, street-level studio for live broadcasts, concerts and public forums and an expansion of the newsroom of over 60 journalists.

Renovation, construction, rent and operating costs for the new Varick Street location amounted to $45 million. In addition to raising these funds, NYPR raised money for a one-time fund of $12.5 million to cover the cost of creating 40 more hours of new programming and three new shows. The total cost of $57.5 million for both the move and programming is nearly three times the $20 million the station had to raise over seven years to buy its licenses from the City in 1997.

=== Acquisition of WQXR (2009) ===
On October 8, 2009, WNYC took control of classical music station WQXR-FM, then at 96.3. WQXR's intellectual property (call letters and format) was acquired from the New York Times Company as part of a three-way transaction with Univision Radio. WNYC also purchased the 105.9 FM frequency of Univision's WCAA (now WXNY-FM). WQXR-FM's classical format moved to 105.9 and WXNY's Spanish Tropical format debuted at 96.3. The deal resulted in WQXR becoming a non-commercial station. With WQXR as a co-owned 24-hour classical station, WNYC-FM dropped its remaining classical music programming to become a full-time news/talk station.

=== Past personalities ===
Following the U.S. entry into World War II, then-mayor Fiorello H. La Guardia made use of the station every Sunday in his Talk to the People program. During a lengthy newspaper workers strike, La Guardia also used the WNYC airwaves to read the latest comic strips to local youngsters while they were not available in New York.

Margaret Juntwait, an announcer and classical music host at WNYC for 15 years, left for the Metropolitan Opera in September 2006. Prior to her death in 2015, Juntwait served as announcer for the Met's Saturday afternoon radio broadcasts, the first woman to hold the position and only the third regular announcer of the long-standing broadcast series, which was launched in 1931. John Schaefer, a music show host at WNYC since 1982, has written liner notes for more than 100 albums, for everyone from Yo-Yo Ma to Terry Riley and was named a "New York influential" by New York Magazine in 2006.

== Programming ==
WNYC produces its own programming, including nationally syndicated shows such as On the Media, The New Yorker Radio Hour, and Radiolab, as well as local news and interview shows that include The Brian Lehrer Show, All of It with Alison Stewart, and New Sounds. The entire schedule is streamed live over the internet, as a result, the station receives listener calls from far-flung states and even has international listeners. Many of these shows are simulcast on its AM sister.

WNYC has a local news team of 60 journalists, producers, editors, and other broadcasting professionals.

- On the Media is a nationally syndicated, weekly one-hour program hosted by Brooke Gladstone, covering the media and its effect on American culture and society. Many stories investigate how events of the past week were covered by the press. Stories also regularly cover such topics as video news releases, net neutrality, media consolidation, censorship, freedom of the press, spin, and how the media is changing with technology. It won a Peabody Award in 2004. In 2023, On the Media won a Peabody Award for its series "The Divided Dial", which charts the growth and influence of the broadcasting company, Salem Media Group and its impact on far-right politics.
- The Brian Lehrer Show is a two-hour weekday talk show covering local and national current events and social issues hosted by Brian Lehrer, a former anchor and reporter for NBC Radio Network. It won a Peabody Award in 2007 "for facilitating reasoned conversation about critical issues and opening it up to everyone within earshot".
- All of It with Alison Stewart, covers culture in the broadest sense - religion, food, language, music etc.
- Consider This, a short form daily news podcast from WNYC and NPR, hosted by Janae Pierre. The show offers a mix of the day's top local stories from WNYC and national stories from NPR.

WNYC broadcasts the major daily news programs produced by NPR, including Morning Edition and All Things Considered, as well as the BBC World Service and selected programs from Public Radio Exchange including This American Life.

Other WNYC and WNYC Studios produced programs and podcasts include:

- Radiolab – two-time Peabody Award-winning podcast attempts to approach broad, difficult topics such as "time" and "morality" in an accessible and light-hearted manner and with a distinctive audio production style.
- New Sounds – guest musicians, from David Byrne to Meredith Monk, present performances and showcase new works from classical to folk and jazz.
- Radio Rookies – provides teenagers with the tools and training to create radio stories about themselves, their communities and their world. It won a Peabody Award in 2005.
- Death, Sex & Money – Anna Sale talks to celebrities and regular people about relationships, money, family, work and making it all count.
- Notes from America with Kai Wright, a live call-in show about the unfinished business of our history, and its grip on our future
- NYC NOW, A podcast feed that delivers local news from WNYC and Gothamist every morning, midday and evening.

== Listenership and new media ==
WNYC has been an early adopter of new technologies including HD Radio, live audio streaming, and podcasting. RSS feeds and email newsletters link to archived audio of individual program segments. WNYC also makes some of its programming available on the WNYC app.

== See also ==
- WNYC (820 AM), WNYC-FM's sister station
- WPXN-TV (channel 31, formerly WNYC-TV)
- Media in New York City
