= Linfinity =

American rock band

- Origin: New York City
- Genre: Rock
- Label: American Myth Recordings
- Members: Dylan Von Wagner
- Past members: Russ Lemkin, Megan Berson, Al Paxton

Linfinity is an American rock band from New York City. The name Linfinity derives from a story told to Dylan by a World War One veteran. According to the veteran, Linfinity was a mantra word told by a general to his soldiers to say over and over to relieve shell shock.

They are currently on the independent music label American Myth Recordings. Rolling Stone magazine and WNYC Soundcheck's John Schaefer describe Linfinity as having an "Old World" quality. Schaefer characterized Linfinity's lead singer Dylan Von Wagner voice as "a strange blend of David Byrne and Antony Hegarty. and Rolling Stone magazine likens his voice to "Eddie Vedder and Tiny Tim harmonizing."

Linfinity's first full album, Martian's Bloom, was received with critical praise, including the track "Holy Rain" after it was featured on NPR's All Songs Considered 2010 Spring Music Preview. MTV's Pepsi refresh campaign features the song "MSG". Vanity Fair spotlighted the song "Seesaw Love" in their video interview with Michael Cera and the song "Molly Mar of Rome" in their video interview with Lindsay Lohan.

== Discography ==
=== LPs ===
- Live at Marcata: Demos, 2007, St. Ives Records
- Martian's Bloom, 2010, American Myth Recordings

=== Singles ===
- "Road to Nowhere", Talking Heads cover, 2010
