= Soundcheck (radio program) =

American talk radio program from New York City, United States of America

- Country of origin: United States
- Language: English
- Home station: WNYC-FM, WNYC
- Hosted by: John Schaefer
- Recording studio: New York City
- Original release: 2002
- Website: www.wnyc.org/shows/soundcheck
- Podcast: feeds.wnyc.org/wnyc_soundcheck

Soundcheck is a talk radio program about music and the arts hosted by John Schaefer. It is produced by WNYC-FM, New York Public Radio. From 2002 to 2012, the show aired at 2 p.m. ET on 93.9 FM in New York City and on XM Satellite Radio Channel 133. The show underwent a summer hiatus from the airwaves in May 2012, and returned in September of that year.

After a break where the show was podcast-only, the show returned on-air on WNYC on Saturdays at 8 p.m. ET on June 27, 2026.

== About Soundcheck ==
Soundcheck covers music of all genres and styles and features interviews with performers, composers, authors and critics as well as frequent call-in segments. The show covers the latest music industry news, trends and ideas and is notable for its frequent in-studio performance segments. Guests have included singer-songwriters such as Norah Jones, M. Ward and Suzanne Vega; rock and pop musicians such as Robert Plant, David Byrne, and Moby; classical artists like cellist Yo-Yo Ma and violinist Anne-Sophie Mutter; world music performers like Ladysmith Black Mambazo and Youssou N'Dour; and jazz artists such as Wynton Marsalis and Ornette Coleman. Call-in segments regularly cover such subjects as rock 'n' roll history, personal technology, pop culture, online music distribution, arts philanthropy, new music, classical music, and audience trends. The show has also presented remote broadcasts from music venues around New York City and from Tanglewood in Massachusetts. On April 8, 2007, Soundcheck marked its five-year anniversary.

Soundcheck′s senior producer is Joel Meyer, its associate producer is Katie Bishop and its assistant producer is Gretta Cohn. The show's technical director is Irene Trudel.

== About John Schaefer ==
In addition to hosting Soundcheck, John Schaefer has also hosted and produced WNYC's new-music program New Sounds since 1982. Since 1986, he has produced and hosted New Sounds Live, an annual series of live broadcast concerts devoted to many types of new and unusual forms of music. Since 1991 he has produced and hosted WNYC's programs of classical performances, both in studio and in various concert halls.
