= WQXW =

WQXR classical music public radio station in Ossining, New York

Simulcasts WQXR-FM, Newark, New Jersey
- Ossining, New York; United States
- Broadcast area: Northern Westchester
- Frequency: 90.3 MHz
- Branding: Classical New York 105.9 WQXR

Programming
- Format: Classical music

Ownership
- Owner: New York Public Radio
- Sister stations: WNYC; WNYC-FM; WQXR-FM; New Jersey Public Radio

History
- First air date: 1982
- Former call signs: WDFH (1992–2013)
- Call sign meaning: "WQXR Westchester"

Technical information
- Licensing authority: FCC
- Facility ID: 71711
- Class: A
- ERP: 250 watts
- HAAT: 145 meters (476 ft)
- Transmitter coordinates: 41°9′7.3″N 73°47′8.4″W

Links
- Public license information: Public file; LMS
- Website: www.wqxr.org

WQXW (90.3 FM) is an all-classical music, non-commercial radio station licensed to Ossining, New York. It simulcasts WQXR-FM, the only classical music station in New York City.

WQXW covers much of northern and central Westchester County, reaching northern portions of the New York metropolitan area where WQXR cannot reach. WQXW's transmitter is located in Chappaqua, New York.

== History ==
The radio station originated in 1982 as WDFH, a community radio station that broadcast a freeform radio format of progressive and alternative rock, jazz, blues, and folk. WDFH had a several-decades long history, starting out as a cable-based station in the 1980s and finally moving to the FM band in 1992.

One of WDFH's notable programs in its final years was OutCasting, a program for LGBTQ youth.

On July 29, 2013, WDFH ceased broadcasting, and the broadcast license was subsequently purchased by New York Public Radio, changing call letters to WQXW and becoming a rebroadcaster of WQXR.
