= OutCasting =

OutCasting is a public radio program for LGBTQ youth. Launched in October 2011, OutCasting was originally broadcast on WDFH 90.3 FM, owned by the Hudson Valley Community Radio, Inc. in Ossining, New York. After WDFH went off the air in 2013, it was replaced with WQXW (which is a repeater of Classical Station WQXR-FM), production of OutCasting was transferred to Media for the Public Good, Inc. OutCasting is distributed throughout the United States by the Pacifica Radio Network and subsequently on PRX.

In 2019 Media for the Public Good, Inc. / OutCasting Media submitted episodes of OutCasting to the American Archive of Public Broadcasting, including 129 episodes from three distinct series: OutCasting, OutCasting OffAir (later called OutCasting Overtime), and OutCasting Plus. OutCasting is created by and for LGBTQ youth and straight allies, and is intended for a general listening audience that is open to learning about LGBTQ issues but may not know much about them.

Topics presented included:

- Bullying and teen suicide, with guest Dan Savage, activist, author, and co-founder of the It Gets Better Project
- The history and partial lifting of the Boy Scouts of America's gay ban;
- The state of marriage equality following the Supreme Court's Defense of Marriage Act and Proposition 8 decisions, with guest civil rights attorney Evan Wolfson, founder of Freedom to Marry and one of the key architects of the marriage equality movement, and guest Lavi Soloway, an attorney representing LGBTQ couples and a founder of Immigration Equality and the DOMA Project
- LGBTQ issues in religion, with guests Bishop Gene Robinson of the Episcopal Diocese of New Hampshire and Rabbi Sharon Kleinbaum of Congregation Beit Simchat Torah in New York City
- Transgender issues, including a two part interview with guest transgender activist Juli Grey-Owens and a discussion about New York State's Gender Expression Non-Discrimination Act, with the bill’s sponsor, New York State Assemblyman Richard Gottfried
- A program on LGBTQ issues and the 2014 Winter Olympics in Sochi, featuring Greg Louganis, diving champion and multiple Olympic medalist, and Brian Healey of Athlete Ally
- LGBTQ issues in public schools, with California State Senator Mark Leno, the sponsor of a law to end the exclusion of LGBTQ history from school curricula there
