= WNYC Transmitter Park =

Public park in Brooklyn, New York

Coordinates: 40°43′48″N 73°57′39″W

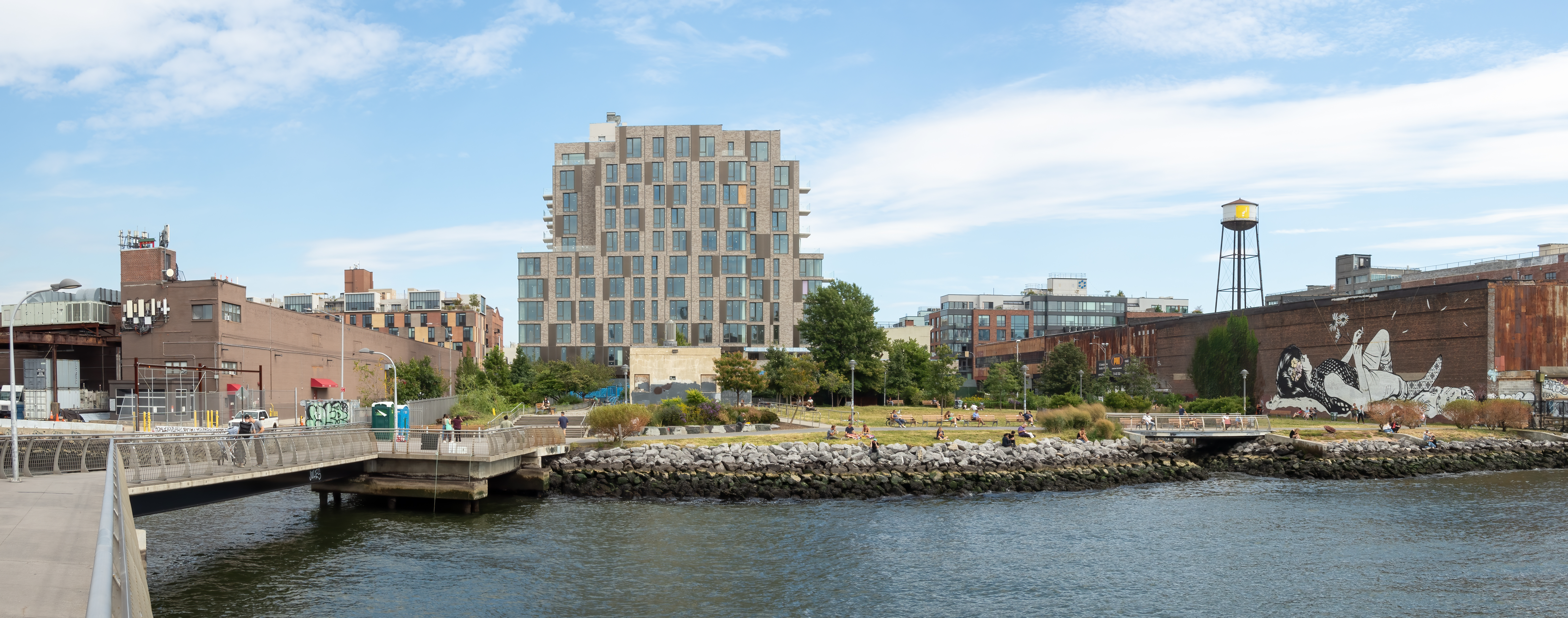
WNYC Transmitter Park in October 2021

WNYC Transmitter Park is a 6.61-acre public park located in the Greenpoint neighborhood of Brooklyn, New York City, where Greenpoint Avenue meets the East River shoreline. The site was acquired by the public radio station WNYC in 1935 as the site of twin antennas used for broadcasting. From 1937 to 1990, the city-operated station broadcast its AM signal from this location. Following the adoption of antennas in Kearny, New Jersey and atop the World Trade Center, the Greenpoint property sat unused. Construction on WNYC Transmitter Park began in August 2010 and the park opened two years later in September 2012.

WNYC Transmitter Park still contains WNYC's old transmitter house.

The park also includes a playground and a large mural of a girl with flowers by the artistic collaboration FAILE.
