= Greenpoint and Roosevelt Avenues =

Avenue in Brooklyn and Queens, New York

Greenpoint Avenue Roosevelt Avenue
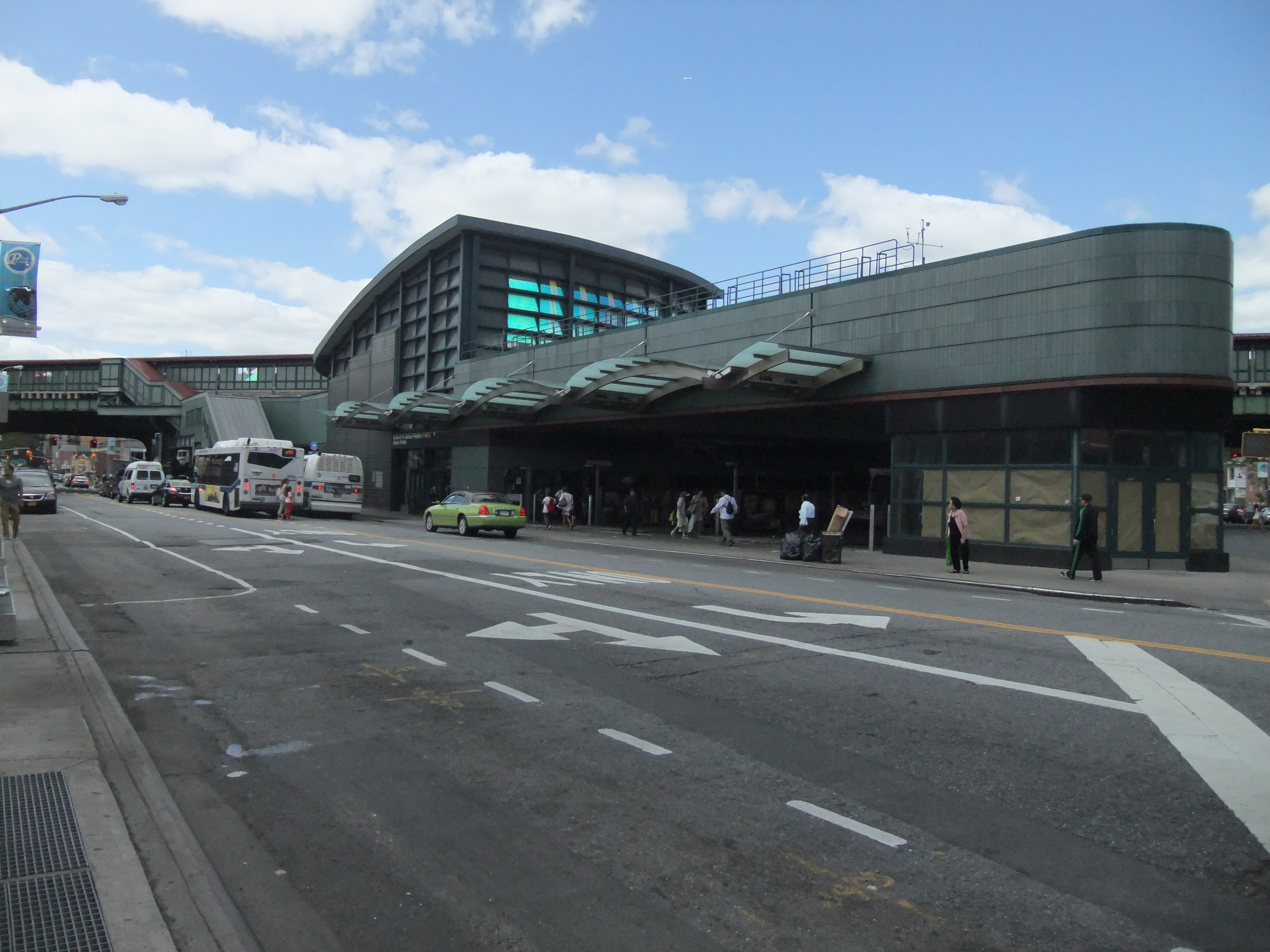
- Roosevelt Avenue Bus Terminal in Jackson Heights
- Interactive map of Greenpoint Avenue; Roosevelt Avenue
- Namesake: Greenpoint Bluff; Theodore and Franklin D. Roosevelt
- Owner: City of New York
- Maintained by: NYCDOT
- Length: 8.3 mi (13.4 km); 2.4 mi (3.86 km) as Greenpoint Avenue; 5.9 mi (9.50 km) as Roosevelt Avenue
- Location: Kings and Queens counties, New York, United States
- Postal code: 11222, 11101, 11104, 11377, 11372, 11373, 11368, 11354
- Nearest metro station: Greenpoint Avenue; Flushing Line; Roosevelt/74th
- West end: West Street in Greenpoint
- Major junctions: I-495 in Long Island City; NY 25 (Queens Boulevard) in Sunnyside; Grand Central Parkway in Willets Point
- East end: NY 25A (Northern Boulevard) / 156th Street in Murray Hill

Roosevelt Avenue and Greenpoint Avenue are main thoroughfares in the New York City boroughs of Queens and Brooklyn. Roosevelt Avenue begins at 48th Street and Queens Boulevard in the neighborhood of Sunnyside. West of Queens Boulevard, the road is named Greenpoint Avenue and continues through Sunnyside and Long Island City across the Greenpoint Avenue Bridge into Brooklyn, terminating at WNYC Transmitter Park on the East River in the neighborhood of Greenpoint. Roosevelt Avenue goes through Woodside, Jackson Heights, Elmhurst, Corona, Flushing Meadows–Corona Park, Willets Point, and Flushing. In Flushing, Roosevelt Avenue ends at 156th Street and Northern Boulevard.

== History ==
Greenpoint Avenue was first laid out in 1853 by the Green-Point and Flushing Plank Road Company, who projected a road from the ferry at Greenpoint on a somewhat direct course to Flushing. Upon encountering resistance from local farmers, their road ended at Calvary Cemetery, and was first used in 1854. Roosevelt Avenue is named after US Presidents Theodore Roosevelt and Franklin D. Roosevelt.

Roosevelt Avenue was nationally recognized for its cuisine when Good Magazine named it one of "America's Tastiest Streets". It’s also well known for its diversity of cultural representation, ranging from Indian to Latin American, while in the 2020s, Downtown Flushing is undergoing rapid gentrification by Chinese transnational entities. More than three hundred languages are spoken along the street, and the neighborhoods it passes through are described as the most ethnically diverse in the world. Roosevelt Avenue is a known area for street prostitution.

== Landmarks ==
Structures along the avenues include Eberhard Faber Pencil Factory on the western end of Greenpoint Avenue and the Newtown Creek Wastewater Treatment Plant just west of the Greenpoint Avenue Bridge. Citi Field, the home ballpark of the New York Mets of Major League Baseball (MLB), is located on the intersection of Roosevelt Avenue and Seaver Way (formerly 126th Street) in Flushing Meadows-Corona Park. Shea Stadium, the former home of the Mets and the New York Jets of the American Football League (AFL) and the National Football League (NFL), was located in the Citi Field parking lots. Etihad Park, the future home stadium of New York City FC of Major League Soccer (MLS), is currently under construction adjacent to Citi Field in Willets Point and is scheduled to open in 2027. The eastern end of Roosevelt Avenue contains the Protestant Reformed Dutch Church of Flushing.

== Transportation ==
The corridor is served by the following subway lines:

- 7 and <7> trains run on the elevated IRT Flushing Line tracks above Roosevelt Avenue with ten stations from the 52nd Street station in Woodside until it reaches Flushing – Main Street, its eastern terminus. The rail line opened in 1917, when Roosevelt Avenue was formed from the combination of other streets into one main avenue.
- The Jackson Heights–Roosevelt Avenue/74th Street station is served by the (7, <7>, E, F, <F>, M, and R trains) in Jackson Heights.
- G trains stop at the Greenpoint Avenue station located at Greenpoint Avenue and Manhattan Avenue.

The following bus routes serve Roosevelt:

- The Q32 runs between Queens Boulevard and either 81st Street (Jackson Heights), or 82nd Street (Midtown, Manhattan).
- The Q90 runs between Seaver Way and either Main Street (Flushing) or Prince Street (LaGuardia Airport). The latter trips deadhead west of Lippman Plaza before going in service.
- The Q53 runs between Broadway and either 39th Avenue (Woodside) or 62nd Street (Rockaway Park). The latter trips deadhead east of 61st Street before going in service.
- The Q33 runs from 82nd to 75th Streets (Jackson Heights) or from 74th to 83rd Streets (LaGuardia Airport).
- Q29 buses that run the full route to Jackson Heights deadhead west from 83rd to 82nd Streets before starting Glendale service.
- For buses with Flushing terminals:
  - The Q12 runs east from Main Street to Bowne Street, going into Little Neck service at Union Street.
  - The Q13 and Q15 run on Roosevelt west of Bowne Street and make their first and last stops between Union & Main Streets in both directions. These buses deadhead back around via Main Street, 39th Avenue and Prince Street.
  - Beechhurst-bound Q61 buses run in service from Union Street to Main Street.
  - The Q19, Q63 and Q66 buses deadhead from Prince Street to Main Street, where westbound service originates.
  - The Nassau-bound n20G and n20x buses run from Bowne Street to Main Street.

The B24 is the only bus route to serve Greenpoint Avenue, from 47th Street to West Street (Greenpoint), and from Manhattan Avenue to 48th Street (Williamsburg). Greenpoint service runs east on the avenue non-stop from Franklin Street to Manhattan Avenue before switching to Williamsburg. The one-way section from Review Avenue to Starr Avenue requires westbound buses to divert around Van Dam Street.

== See also ==
- Red-light district
