= 52nd Street station (IRT Flushing Line) =

New York City Subway station in Queens

52 Street
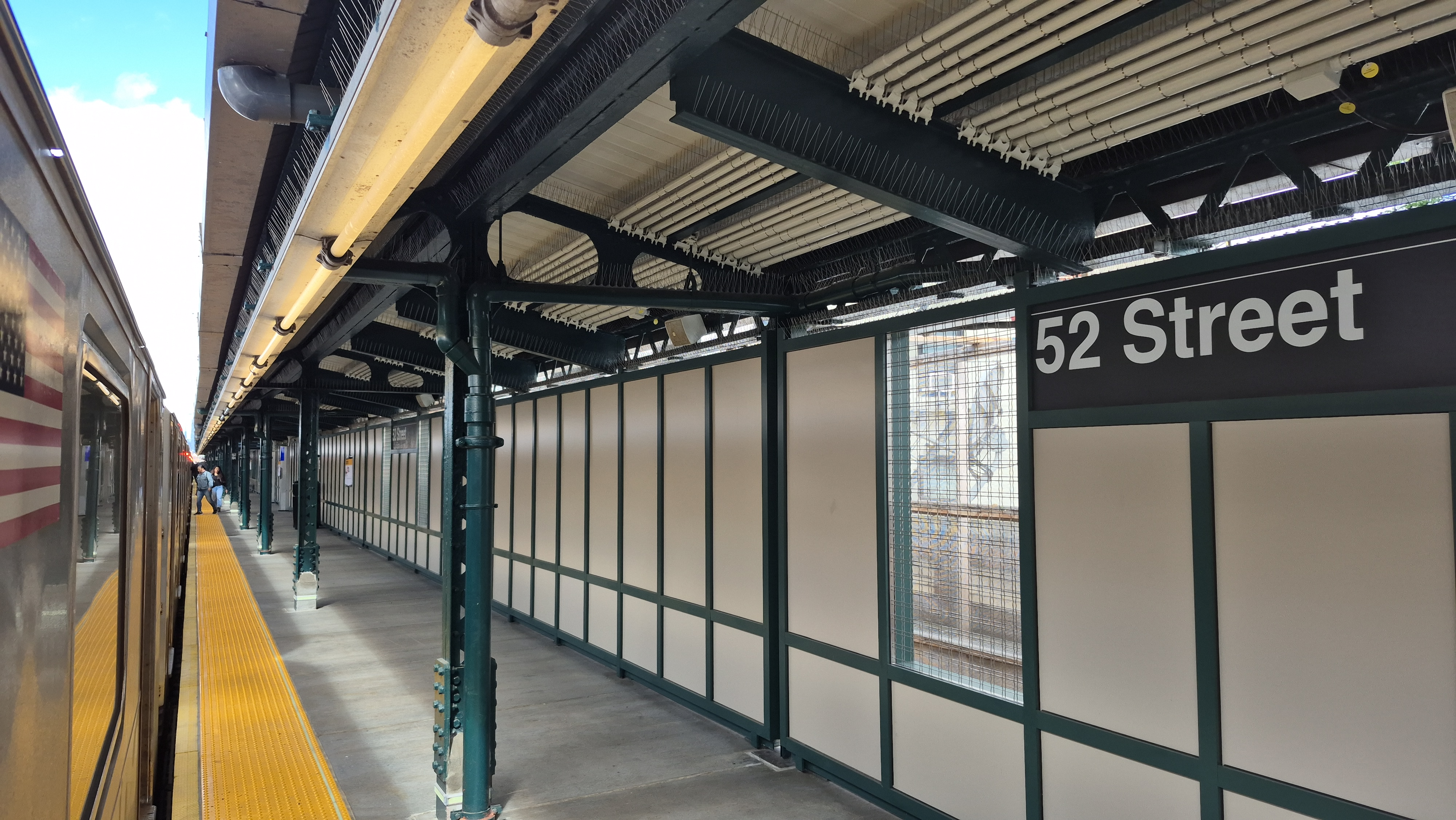
- Manhattan-bound platform in 2026

Station statistics
- Address: 52nd Street & Roosevelt Avenue; Woodside, New York
- Borough: Queens
- Locale: Woodside
- Coordinates: 40°44′38.53″N 73°54′46.31″W
- Division: A (IRT)
- Line: IRT Flushing Line
- Services: 7 (all times)
- Transit: MTA Bus: Q32
- Structure: Elevated
- Platforms: 2 side platforms
- Tracks: 3

Other information
- Opened: April 21, 1917; 109 years ago
- Former/other names: 52nd Street–Lincoln Avenue

Traffic
- 2025: 1,242,756 ▼16.9%
- Rank: 269 out of 423
Services
Preceding station	New York City Subway	Following station
46th Street–Bliss Street toward 34th Street–Hudson Yards	Local	61st Street–Woodside One-way operation
does not stop here
Location
Location within New York City Subway
Location within New York City
Location within New York
Track layout
Street map
Station service legend
Symbol	Description
Stops all times	Stops all times

The 52nd Street station (also known as the 52nd Street–Lincoln Avenue station) is a local station on the IRT Flushing Line of the New York City Subway. Located at the intersection of 52nd Street and Roosevelt Avenue in the neighborhood of Woodside in Queens, it is served by the 7 train at all times.

== History ==
=== Early history ===
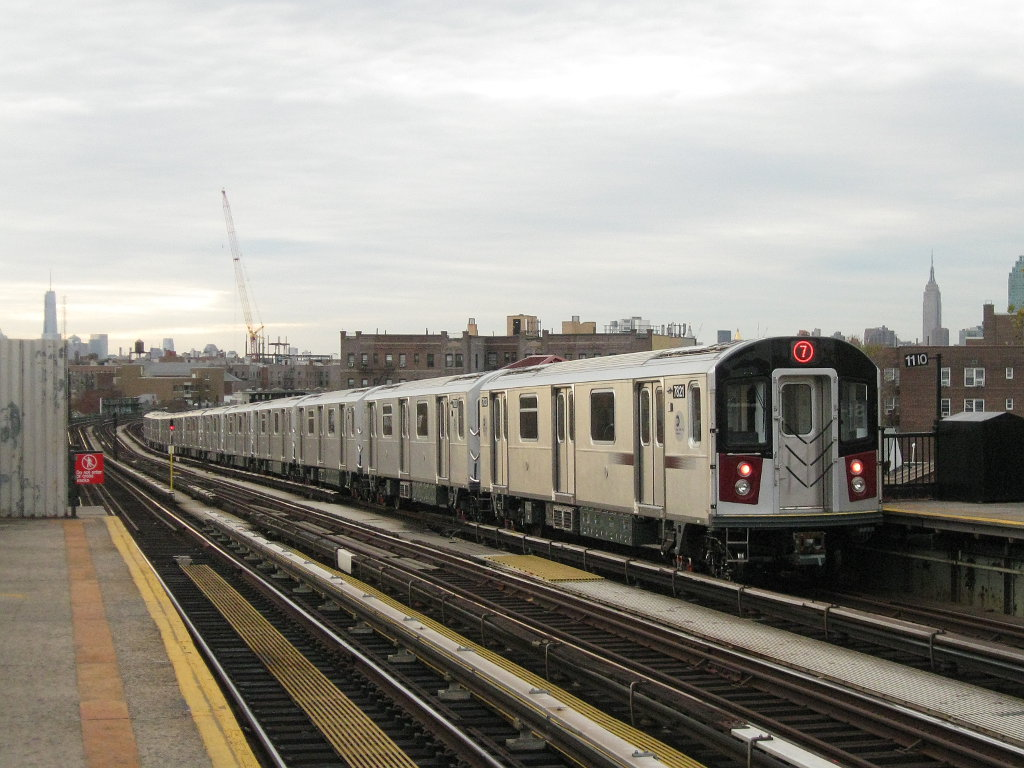
R188 7 train leaving the station

The 1913 Dual Contracts called for the Interborough Rapid Transit Company (IRT) and Brooklyn Rapid Transit Company (BRT; later Brooklyn–Manhattan Transit Corporation, or BMT) to build new lines in Brooklyn, Queens, and the Bronx. Queens did not receive many new IRT and BRT lines compared to Brooklyn and the Bronx, since the city's Public Service Commission (PSC) wanted to alleviate subway crowding in the other two boroughs first before building in Queens, which was relatively undeveloped. The IRT Flushing Line was to be one of two Dual Contracts lines in the borough, along with the Astoria Line; it would connect Flushing and Long Island City, two of Queens's oldest settlements, to Manhattan via the Steinway Tunnel. When the majority of the line was built in the early 1910s, most of the route went through undeveloped land, and Roosevelt Avenue had not been constructed. Community leaders advocated for more Dual Contracts lines to be built in Queens to allow development there.

The Flushing Line was opened from Queensboro Plaza to Alburtis Avenue (now 103rd Street–Corona Plaza) on April 21, 1917, with a local station at 52nd Street.

=== Later years ===
The city government took over the IRT's operations on June 12, 1940. The IRT routes were given numbered designations in 1948 with the introduction of "R-type" rolling stock, which contained rollsigns with numbered designations for each service. The route from Times Square to Flushing became known as the 7. On October 17, 1949, the joint BMT/IRT operation of the Flushing Line ended, and the line became the responsibility of the IRT. After the end of BMT/IRT dual service, the New York City Board of Transportation announced that the Flushing Line platforms would be lengthened to 11 IRT car lengths; the platforms were only able to fit nine 51-foot-long IRT cars beforehand. The platforms at the station were extended in 1955–1956 to accommodate 11-car trains. However, nine-car trains continued to run on the 7 route until 1962, when they were extended to ten cars. With the opening of the 1964 New York World's Fair, trains were lengthened to eleven cars.

As part of the 2015–2019 Capital Program, the MTA announced plans to renovate the 52nd, 61st, 69th, 82nd, 103rd and 111th Streets stations, a project that had been delayed for several years. Conditions at these stations were reported to be among the worst of all stations in the subway system. The Manhattan-bound platform at the 52nd Street station will close for renovation starting winter 2025, followed by the closure of the Flushing-bound platform. On June 23, 2025, the Manhattan-bound platform closed for renovations until early 2026. The Manhattan-bound platform reopened on May 25, 2026, while the Flushing-bound platform closed for renovations at the time, with an expected reopening date of 2027.

== Station layout ==
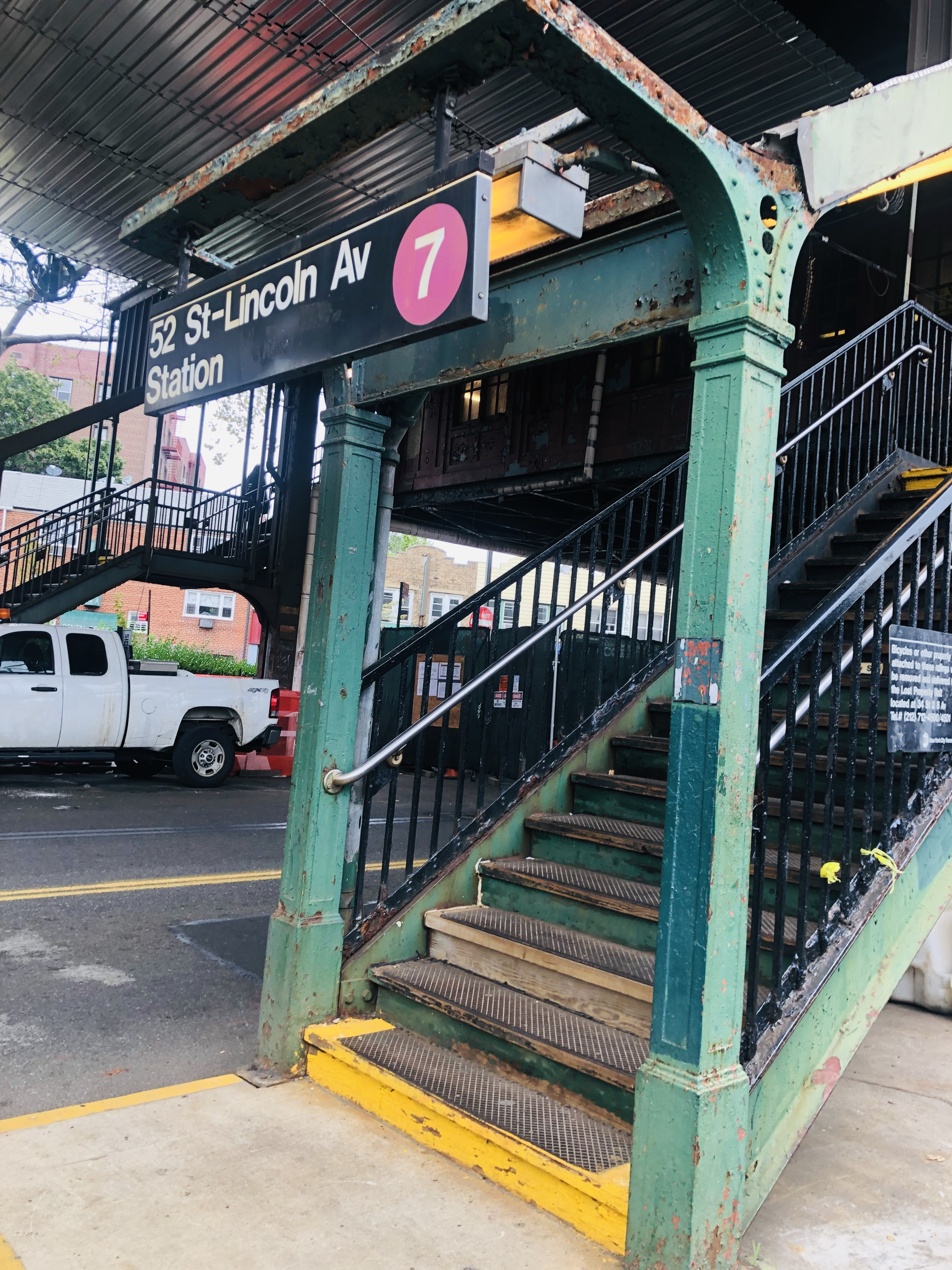
Street stair

This elevated station has two side platforms and three tracks. The center express track is used by the rush hour peak direction <7> express train. Both platforms have beige windscreens and brown canopies with green roofs along the entire length except for a small section at the south end, which has only a windscreen on the eastbound side and a waist-high steel fence on the westbound side.

This is the southernmost (geographical west) station on the IRT Flushing Line that is on a steel viaduct above Roosevelt Avenue. West of this station, the line curves and becomes a concrete viaduct above Queens Boulevard until 32nd Place.

=== Exits ===
This station has two entrances. The full-time one is a wooden elevated station house beneath the tracks at the south end. It has a single staircase to each platform, waiting area that allows free transfer between directions, turnstile bank, token booth, and two staircases to the street, one to each western corner of 52nd Street and Roosevelt Avenue.

The other entrance is at the station's extreme north (geographical east) end. A single canopied staircase from each platform goes down a landing outside of a now-closed elevated station house beneath the tracks. A single HEET turnstile provides entrance/exit from the station before a street stair goes down 53rd Street and Roosevelt Avenue. The Manhattan-bound staircase is at the northeast corner while the Flushing-bound one is at the southeast corner.
