= WNYC (AM) =

Public radio station in New York City

- New York, New York; United States
- Broadcast area: New York metropolitan area
- Frequency: 820 kHz
- Branding: WNYC AM 820

Programming
- Language: English
- Format: News/talk (public)
- Affiliations: NPR

Ownership
- Owner: New York Public Radio
- Sister stations: WNYC-FM; WQXR-FM; WQXW; New Jersey Public Radio

History
- First air date: July 8, 1924
- Former frequencies: 570 kHz (1924–1931); 810 kHz (1931–1941); 830 kHz (1941–1989)
- Call sign meaning: New York City

Technical information
- Licensing authority: FCC
- Facility ID: 73357
- Class: B
- Power: 10,000 watts (day); 1,000 watts (night)
- Transmitter coordinates: 40°45′10.37″N 74°06′13.51″W
- Repeater: 93.9 WNYC-FM (New York City)

Links
- Public license information: Public file; LMS
- Webcast: Listen live (via iHeartRadio)
- Website: wnyc.org

WNYC (820 kHz) is a non-commercial public radio station, licensed to New York, New York. It, along with WNYC-FM, is one of the primary outlets for WNYC branded programming, provided by the non-profit New York Public Radio (NYPR).

WNYC broadcasts from studios and offices located in the Hudson Square neighborhood in lower Manhattan, and its transmitter site is located in Kearny, New Jersey. WNYC has been an early adopter of new technologies including HD radio, live audio streaming, and podcasting. RSS feeds and email newsletters link to archived audio of individual program segments. WNYC makes all of its programming available on the WNYC app.

== Programming ==
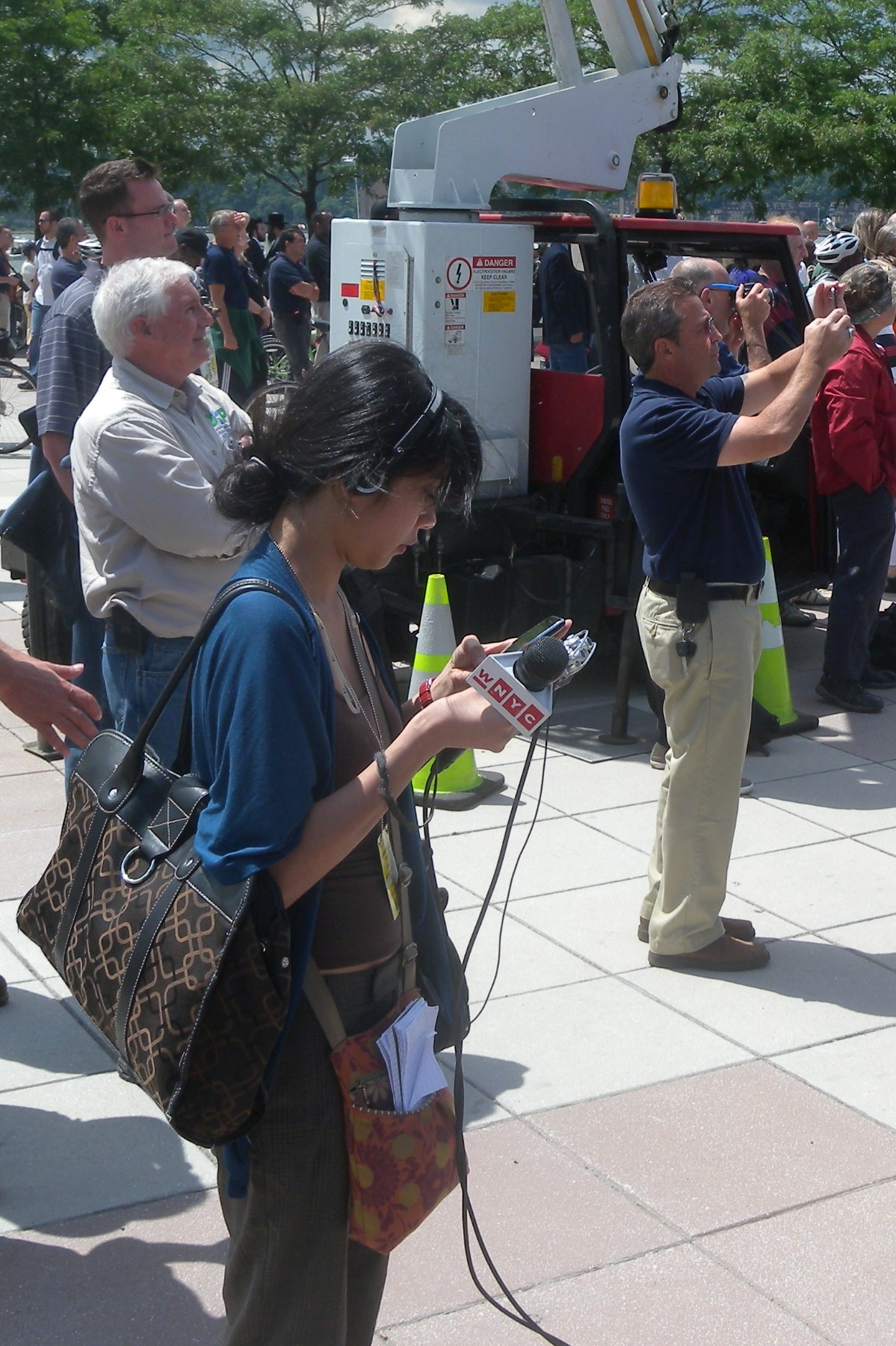
WNYC reporter

WNYC produces its own programming, including the nationally distributed shows On the Media, and Radiolab, as well as local news and interview shows that include All Of It with Alison Stewart, New Sounds and The Brian Lehrer Show.

On the Media is a nationally syndicated, weekly one-hour program hosted by Brooke Gladstone, covering the media and its effect on American culture and society. Many stories investigate how events of the past week were covered by the press. Stories also regularly cover such topics as video news releases, net neutrality, media consolidation, censorship, freedom of the press, spin, and how the media is changing with technology. It won a Peabody Award in 2004. In 2023, On the Media won a second Peabody Award for its series "The Divided Dial", which charts the growth and influence of the broadcasting company Salem Media Group.

The Brian Lehrer Show is a two-hour weekday talk show covering local and national current events and social issues hosted by Brian Lehrer, a former anchor and reporter for NBC Radio Network. It won a Peabody Award in 2007 "for facilitating reasoned conversation about critical issues and opening it up to everyone within earshot."

WNYC broadcasts the major daily news programs produced by NPR, including Morning Edition and All Things Considered, as well as the BBC World Service and selected programs from Public Radio Exchange including This American Life.

== History ==
=== Early years (1924–1937) ===
WNYC is one of the oldest radio stations in New York, and the City of New York was one of the first American municipalities to be directly involved in broadcasting.

Funds for its establishment were approved on June 2, 1922, by the New York City Board of Estimate and Apportionment. After encountering resistance from AT&T and its Western Electric subsidiary in providing a transmitter, Grover Whalen, Commissioner for Plant and Structures, arranged for the purchase of a second-hand Westinghouse transmitter, previously used at the 1922–1923 Independence Centenary International Exposition in Rio de Janeiro, Brazil. WNYC was first licensed on July 2, 1924, to the City of New York, transmitting on 570 kHz. It made its formal debut broadcast on July 8, 1924, from the Manhattan Municipal Building.

Effective November 11, 1928, the recently formed Federal Radio Commission (FRC), forerunner to today's Federal Communications Commission (FCC), implemented a major nationwide reallocation under the provisions of its General Order 40. The New York City area was one of the most congested regions, and WNYC was reassigned to a time-sharing arrangement on 570 kHz with WMCA, another pioneering New York radio outlet.

The owners of WMCA also controlled a second New York City station, WPCH, on 810 kHz. WCCO, in Minneapolis, was the dominant clear channel assignment on this frequency. Because AM radio waves travel farther at night, WPCH was restricted to daytime-only operations, broadcasting from sunrise to sunset.

To provide WMCA unlimited hours of operation on 570 kHz, in 1932 the FRC approved an application to delete WPCH, and have WNYC move from 570 kHz to the vacated frequency. A losing legal battle by WNYC, which wanted to remain on 570 kHz, was conducted until 1933. WNYC was now licensed on 810 kHz with unlimited daytime hours, but, unless it received special permission, was restricted from making nighttime broadcasts.

=== Great Depression and World War II ===
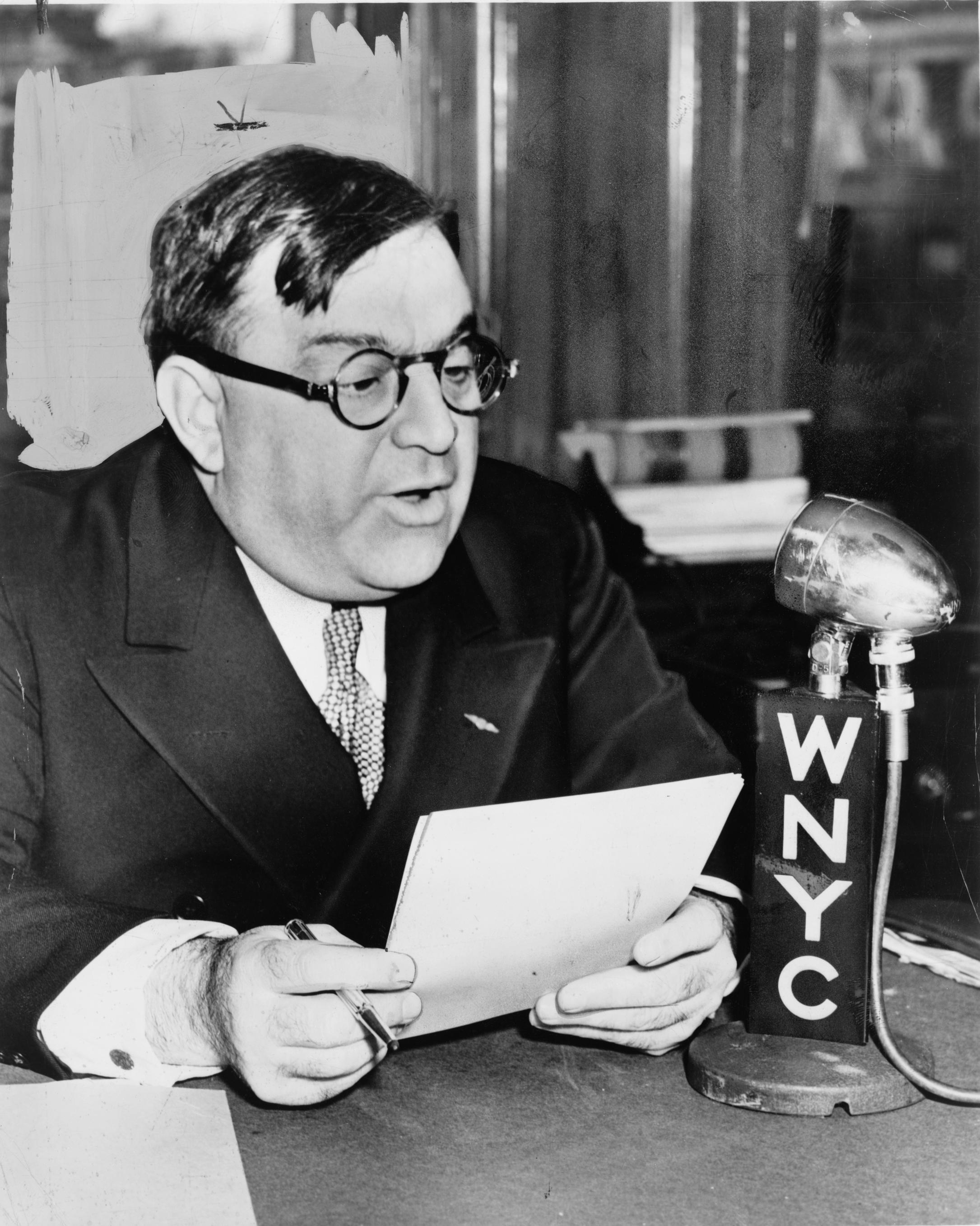
Mayor Fiorello H. La Guardia on his Talk to the People program on WNYC

WNYC's transmitter was moved in 1937 from the Municipal Building to city-owned land at 10 Kent Street in Greenpoint, Brooklyn, as part of a Works Progress Administration (WPA) project. In 1938 the Municipal Broadcasting System was established by the City of New York to run the station. For its first 14 years, WNYC had been run by the New York City Commissioner for Bridges, Plant and Structures. Now, under an agency devoted singularly to its function and with the leadership of new director Morris S. Novik, appointed by Mayor LaGuardia, WNYC became a model public broadcaster. Among its many landmark programs was the annual American Music Festival.

In 1941 the North American Regional Broadcasting Agreement shifted stations on 810 kHz to 830 kHz, with WCCO continuing as the dominant clear channel station. WNYC now held a "limited time" authorization, which meant that it had unlimited daytime hours and could also broadcast until sunset at Minneapolis. WNYC remained a 1,000-watt outlet for the next 48 years. Beginning during World War II, the FCC allowed WNYC to stay on the air a few extra hours in the evening due to the public service it was providing. Beginning in 1942, the station was granted Special Service Authorization (SSA) permission to broadcast as late as 10:00 p.m.

In the autumn of 1949, WNYC's station director was credited with initiating the National Association of Educational Broadcasters' (NAEB) Tape Network, an educational program exchange between its member radio stations. Seymour N. Siegel made five copies of the New York Herald Tribune's public forum discussions which he sent weekly to other NAEB stations who passed them along, east-to-west across the country, eventually reaching 22 of NAEB's then member stations. In January 1952, NAEB published the "NAEB Tape Network Brochure" to its then 80+ radio station members, listing available series and acquisition procedures.

The Municipal Broadcasting System (which was renamed the WNYC Communications Group in 1989) helped to form National Public Radio in 1971 and the WNYC stations were among the 90 stations that carried the inaugural broadcast of All Things Considered later that year.

In 1990, as a result of continued interference with WCCO, and a court ruling in WCCO's favor rescinding the WWII-era approval for nighttime operation by WNYC, the station moved from 830 kHz to 820 kHz, commenced around-the-clock operations and increased its daytime power to 10,000 watts, while maintaining 1,000 watts at night, to protect WBAP in Fort Worth, Texas; WBAP is also a primary clear-channel assignment, but is farther from New York City than Minneapolis. The AM transmitter was moved to Belleville Turnpike in Kearny, New Jersey, sharing three towers with WMCA, its former shared-time partner. The Brooklyn transmitter site was decommissioned and is now WNYC Transmitter Park.

The station's ownership by the City meant that it was occasionally subject to the whims of various mayors. As part of a crackdown on prostitution in 1979, then-Mayor Ed Koch tried to use the three WNYC radio and television stations to broadcast the names of "johns" arrested for soliciting. Announcers threatened a walkout over what was casually called the John Hour and station management refused to comply with the idea; after one forced broadcast with city employees reading off the names, it was discontinued.

=== Independence from the City and move to new studios ===
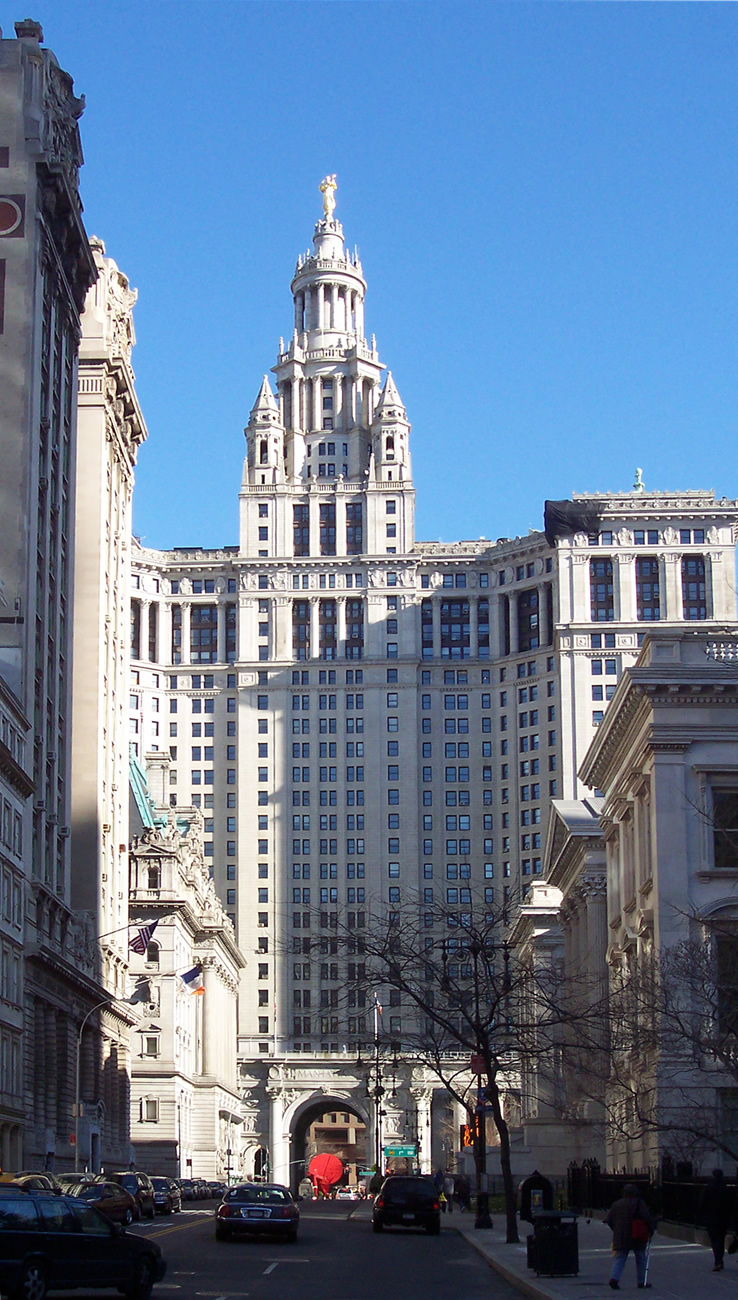
The Manhattan Municipal Building, WNYC's home from 1924 to 2008

Shortly after assuming the mayoralty in 1994, Rudolph W. Giuliani announced he was considering selling the WNYC stations. Giuliani believed that broadcasting was no longer essential as a municipal service, and that the financial compensation from selling the stations could be used to help the City cover budget shortfalls. The final decision was made in March 1995: while the City opted to divest WNYC-TV (now WPXN-TV) through a blind auction to commercial buyers, WNYC-AM-FM was sold to the WNYC Foundation for $20 million over a six-year period, far less than what the stations could have been sold for if they were placed on the open market. While the sale put an end to the occasional political intrusions of the past, it required the WNYC Foundation to embark on a major appeal towards listeners, other foundations, and private benefactors. The station's audience and budget have continued to grow since the split from the City.

The terrorist attacks of September 11, 2001 destroyed WNYC-FM's transmitter at the World Trade Center. WNYC's studios, in the nearby Manhattan Municipal Building, had to be evacuated and station staff was unable to return to its offices for three weeks. The FM signal was knocked off the air for a time. WNYC temporarily moved to studios at National Public Radio's New York bureau in midtown Manhattan, where it broadcast on its still-operating AM signal transmitting from towers in Kearny, New Jersey, and on a live Internet stream. The stations eventually returned to the Municipal Building.

On June 16, 2008, WNYC moved from its 51,400 square feet (4,780 m^{2}) of rent-free space scattered on eight floors of the Manhattan Municipal Building to a new location at 160 Varick Street, near the Holland Tunnel. The station now occupies three-and-a-half floors of a 12-story former printing building. The offices have 12-foot (4 m) ceilings and 71,900 square feet (6,680 m^{2}) of space. The number of recording studios and booths doubled, to 31.. There is a 140-seat, street-level studio for live broadcasts, concerts and public forums, named The Jerome L. Greene Performance Space, and an expansion of the newsroom to over 60 journalists.

Renovation, construction, rent and operating costs for the Varick Street location amounted to $45 million. In addition to raising these funds, WNYC raised money for a one-time fund of $12.5 million to cover the cost of creating 40 more hours of new programming and three new shows. The total cost of $57.5 million for both the move and programming is nearly three times the $20 million the station had to raise over seven years to buy its licenses from the City in 1997.

On January 5, 2025, WNYC and WNYC-FM began simulcasting full-time. The sole exception to the simulcast as of March 2025 is the continuation of Weekend Edition in the 10-11 am timeslot on WNYC; in that timeslot, WNYC-FM airs The New Yorker Radio Hour on Saturdays and On the Media on Sundays.

== Past personalities ==
Past WNYC radio personalities include H. V. Kaltenborn, who hosted radio's first quiz program on WNYC in 1926, the Brooklyn Daily Eagle's "Current Events Bee", a forerunner to shows like National Public Radio's Wait Wait... Don't Tell Me! In its early years the station lacked funds for a record library and would borrow albums from record stores around the Manhattan Municipal Building, where its studios were located. Legend has it, a listener began lending classical records to the station and in 1929, WNYC began broadcast of Masterwork Hour, radio's first program of recorded classical music.

Following the U.S. entry into World War II, then-mayor Fiorello H. La Guardia made use of the station every Sunday in his Talk to the People program. During a 17-day newspaper workers' strike, La Guardia also used the WNYC airwaves to read the latest comic strips to local youngsters while they were not available in New York.

Margaret Juntwait, an announcer and classical music host at WNYC for 15 years, left for the Metropolitan Opera in September 2006. Prior to her death in 2015, Juntwait served as announcer for the Met's Saturday afternoon radio broadcasts, the first woman to hold the position and only the third regular announcer of the long-standing broadcast series, which was launched in 1931. John Schaefer, a music show host at WNYC for 20 years, has written liner notes for more than 100 albums for everyone from Yo-Yo Ma to Terry Riley, and was named a "New York influential" by New York Magazine.

== See also ==
- WNYC-FM (93.9), WNYC's sister station
- WPXN-TV (channel 31, formerly WNYC-TV)
- Media in New York City
