= John Schaefer =

American radio personality

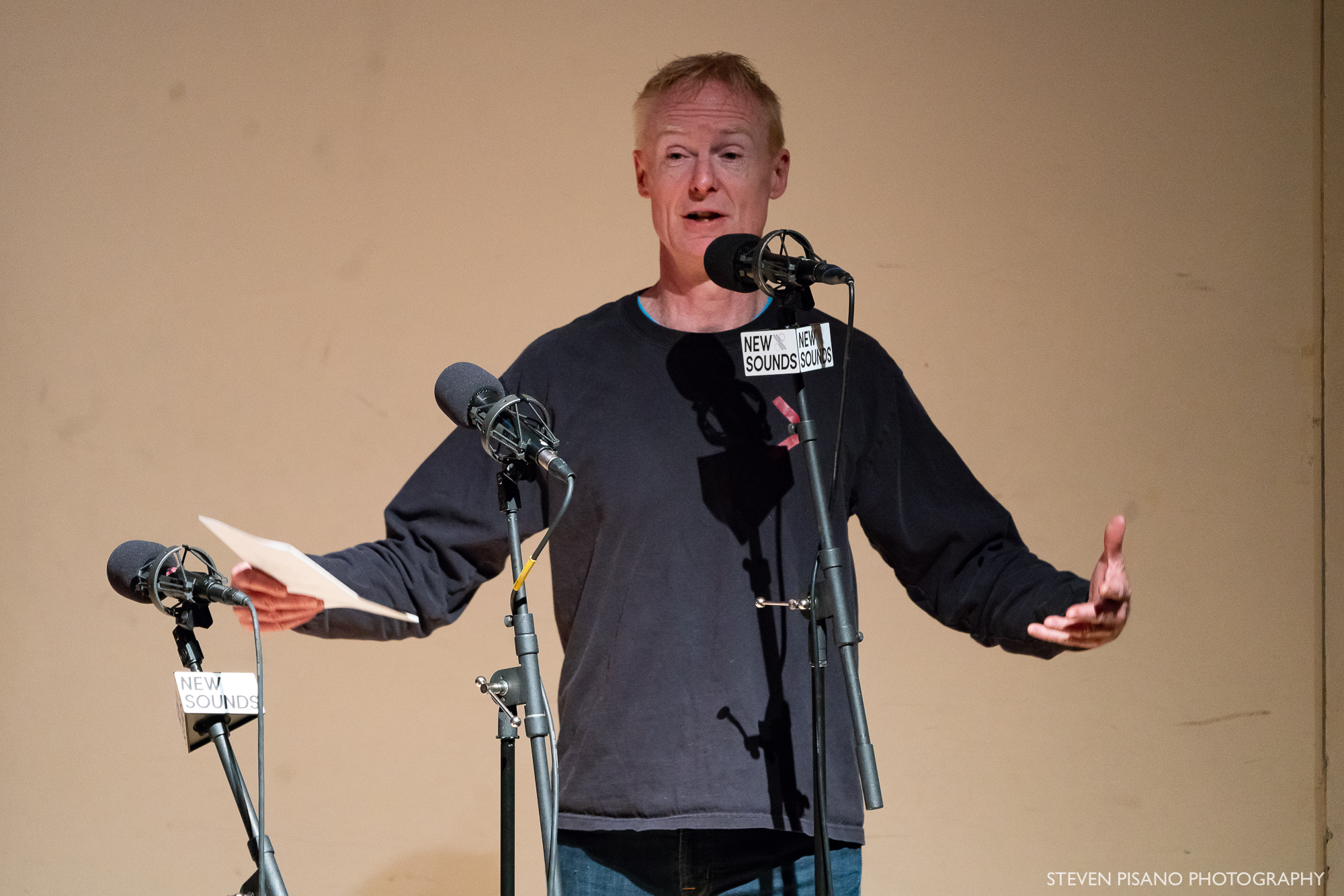
- Schaefer at Merkin Hall in 2018
- Born: Queens, New York City
- Education: Fordham University (B.A., 1980)
- Occupation: Radio host
- Years active: 1981–present
- Organization: New York Public Radio
- Notable work: New Sounds, Soundcheck
- Awards: AMC's Letter of Distinction (2003)
- Website: newsounds.org

John Schaefer is an American radio host and author. A longtime host at WNYC, Schaefer began hosting the influential radio shows New Sounds in 1982 and Soundcheck in 2002, and has produced many different programs for other New York Public Radio platforms. Schaefer is also the author of the book New Sounds: A Listener's Guide to New Music, first published in 1987.

== Early life and education ==
Schaefer was born and raised in Queens, New York. He attended Fordham University in the Bronx, from which he graduated in 1980.

== Career ==
=== Broadcast journalism ===
Schaefer began his career in radio in the late 1970s at WFUV, which was then a student-run college radio station at Fordham University. By the time he graduated, he was the station's programming director, after which he spent one year at a classical station in Portland, Maine before returning to New York and joining WNYC in 1981.

Schaefer began developing his genre-spanning music program New Sounds in early 1982, with the show premiering that September. Billboard has called the show "The No. 1 radio show for the Global Village" and it has been syndicated by NPR as well as by stations in Australia and Taiwan. He began the New Sounds Live concert series in 1986. In 2002, be began hosting the art and music talk radio show Soundcheck for WNYC. He had composer Steve Reich as a guest on his Soundcheck show in 2009. Also for WNYC, Schaefer hosts the segment "Gig Alerts" for the news program Morning Edition.

From January 2016 until January 2017, Schaefer hosted the podcast LPR Live which showcased live performances from the Greenwich Village music venue (Le) Poisson Rouge. The show was broadcast on the digital station Q2, the online affiliate of the classical music station WQXR which, like WYNC, is owned by the non-profit New York Public Radio (NYPR). Later in 2017, Schaefer joined WQXR to host the weekly show The Furthermore and continues to advise on Q2.

In 2018, NYPR announced that they were expanding New Sounds into its own online platform. While Schafer's programs continued to be broadcast on their original stations, the New Sounds "online destination" collected most of Schafer's programs into one place. With this expansion, Schafer also began hosting a new titular online radio station as well. Just a year later, it was reported that all of the New Sounds programming would be dropped by NYPR and Schaefer's shows would no longer be broadcast by WNYC nor WQXR. After more than a week of outcry by the public and musicians, with many calling Schaefer a vital part of the New York music scene, NYPR announced that they would be retaining New Sounds and all of its affiliated programs.

Composer Philip Glass has been quoted saying, "'For we who live in New York to have [Schaefer] in the position he's in at the radio station, that's amazing... There are very few professional music people – not only musicians, but writers about music – who you can really truly say have an open, expansive horizon. And he does."

Schaefer is featured in the 2025 documentary about Meredith Monk entitled Monk in Pieces.

=== Print journalism ===
Schaefer published his first book in 1987, New Sounds: A Listener's Guide to New Music (New York: Harper & Row, 1987). For Virgin, he wrote the book New Sounds: the Virgin Guide to New Music, published in 1990. He has contributed to The Cambridge Companion to Singing (2000) and to Spin and Ear magazines.

Schaefer has written liner notes for more than 100 albums, including for Yo-Yo Ma and Terry Riley. He is also one of the compilation producers on the various artists Invocation album.

== Personal life ==
Schaefer is passionate about horse racing. He grew up near the Aqueduct Racetrack in Queens and spent summers with his family in Saratoga Springs at the Saratoga Race Course. He contributed to the 2006 anthology Bloodlines: A Horse Racing Anthology.

== Original programs ==
- New Sounds (WNYC); since 1982
- Soundcheck (WNYC); since 2002
- Gig Alerts (WNYC); Morning Edition segment
- LPR Live (Q2/WQXR); podcast produced 2016/2017
- The Furthermore (WQXR); since 2017
- Carnegie Hall Live (Carnegie Hall/WQXR); 2018, thirteen-part series co-hosted with Jeff Spurgeon
