= WPXN-TV =

Television station in New York City

- New York, New York; United States
- Channels: Digital: 34 (UHF); Virtual: 31

Programming
- Affiliations: 31.1: Ion Television; for others, see § Subchannels

Ownership
- Owner: Ion Media; (Ion Media License Company, LLC)

History
- First air date: November 5, 1961
- Former call signs: WUHF (1961–1962); WNYC-TV (1962–1996); WBIS (1996–1997)
- Former channel numbers: Analog: 31 (UHF, 1961–2009); Digital: 30 (UHF, 1999–2009), 31 (UHF, 2009–2019)
- Former affiliations: Educational independent (1961–1962); NET (1962–1970); PBS (1970–1996); Commercial independent (primary 1996–1997, secondary 1997–1998); inTV (1997–1998)
- Call sign meaning: Paxson, as in Paxson Communications (predecessor to Ion Media) or Bud Paxson

Technical information
- Licensing authority: FCC
- Facility ID: 73356
- ERP: 170 kW
- HAAT: 520 m (1,706 ft)
- Transmitter coordinates: 40°42′46.8″N 74°0′47.3″W

Links
- Public license information: Public file; LMS
- Website: iontelevision.com

WPXN-TV (channel 31) is a television station in New York City, serving as the local Ion Television outlet. Owned by the Ion Media subsidiary of the E. W. Scripps Company, the station transmits from atop One World Trade Center.

== History ==
=== Municipal ownership (1961–1996) ===
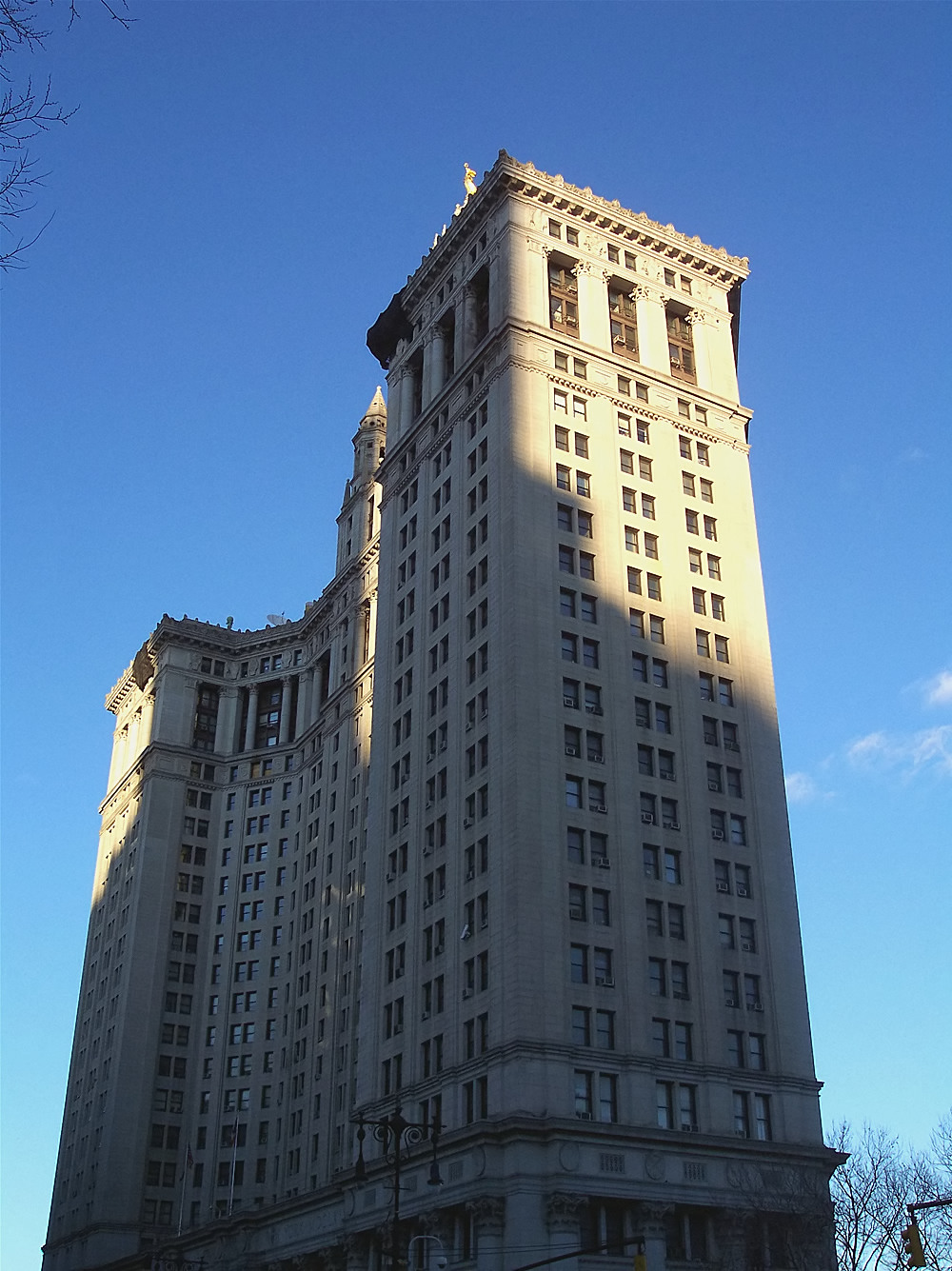
Under city ownership, WNYC-TV was housed in the Manhattan Municipal Building.

The City of New York, which was one of the first municipalities in the United States to enter into broadcasting with the 1924 sign-on of WNYC radio, was granted a construction permit to build a new commercial television station in 1954. Seven years later, on November 5, 1961, WUHF took to the air for the first time. Through the Municipal Broadcasting System, which held the channel 31 license, the city (led by then-mayor Robert F. Wagner Jr.) and the Federal Communications Commission (FCC) used WUHF as an experiment to determine the viability of UHF broadcasts within an urban environment. Some of the early programming on WUHF included simulcasts of New York's existing commercial VHF stations; educational films produced by WNYC's Television Film Unit, established in 1949; college-level distance education telecourses; and, reportedly, a nightly rundown of the New York City Police Department's "wanted" criminals list. The experiment was carried out through the installation of UHF receivers in several hundred test homes, public schools and businesses, with reception monitored by FCC and City engineers.

After a year of test broadcasting was deemed successful, full control of WUHF was then transferred to the city. The station became a full-time operation on November 5, 1962, with new call letters WNYC-TV to match its sister radio stations WNYC (then at 830 AM, now at 820 AM) and WNYC-FM (93.9). Though the channel 31 license was classified as commercial, WNYC-TV was operated as a non-commercial educational station. Some of the programming from the experimental period continued, and now included live broadcasts of the United Nations General Assembly meetings. As a municipally owned station, WNYC-TV also devoted airtime to shows focused on civic affairs, along with other public-interest programs. The station also carried some programming from National Educational Television (NET) and its successor, the Public Broadcasting Service (PBS), but later increasingly ran more independent educational television programs. For many years, WNYC-TV ran a 15-minute newscast on weekdays, called News from City Hall (later called News City and expanded to 30 minutes), highlighting the day's events in municipal government.

In 1979, Mayor Ed Koch considered selling the WNYC stations to other interests due to a municipal fiscal crisis. Instead, the WNYC Foundation was established as an outlet to raise operating capital for the stations. Though there were twice-yearly fundraising appeals made by the WNYC stations, WNYC-TV did not run on-air pledge drives in a manner similar to other PBS stations, mostly because it was a commercial licensee. It would not, however, have faced any problems had it done so, as WNED-TV in Buffalo, New York, operated for decades as a non-commercial broadcaster under a commercial license.

Channel 31 also leased blocks of airtime to foreign-language broadcasters. In the 1980s, among the largest providers of foreign programming were Japan's Fujisankei Communications Group, which aired a morning show on weekdays, and RAI, the Italian public broadcaster which programmed two hours on weeknights, and five hours on Sunday mornings, a period which included airings of Italian soccer games.

Also during this era, WNYC-TV joined the music video phenomenon – and in the process contributed to the growth of hip hop culture and rap music. In the summer of 1983, channel 31 premiered the hour-long Video Music Box, created by station employee Ralph McDaniels. The program started off with an eclectic selection of videos from pop, rock, and rhythm-and-blues artists. Rap music was also included, but eventually the program became exclusive to the rap and R&B genres. Video Music Box served as a launching pad for many rap music artists, and was said to have been the basis behind MTV creating Yo! MTV Raps several years later. Video Music Box would remain prominently on WNYC-TV's schedule for the next decade (the show now airs on WNYE-TV, channel 25).

=== Transition into private ownership (1996–present) ===
Shortly after becoming mayor in 1994, Rudy Giuliani said that he was considering selling the WNYC stations. Giuliani said that broadcasting was no longer essential as a municipal entity, and that any financial compensation would be used to help the City cover budget shortfalls. The final decision was made in March 1995: the WNYC radio stations would be sold to the WNYC Foundation, while the city opted to solicit separate bids for WNYC-TV through a blind auction.

Logo used by WBIS during the S+ era

In August 1995, a partnership of Dow Jones and Company and ITT Corporation (licensed as ITT-Dow Jones Television LLC) was declared the winner of the WNYC-TV auction with a bid of $207 million, which at the time was the largest price ever paid for a UHF television station. The sale of channel 31 to commercial interests had many detractors. Foreign broadcasters complained, as they now found themselves without an outlet for their programming, and individual financial contributors criticized the Giuliani administration for selling the station to the highest commercial bidder, rather than to the WNYC Foundation. The foreign producers found new outlets through WNYE-TV, Newton, New Jersey–based WMBC-TV, and the City-owned Crosswalks cable TV network (now NYC Media), and eventually dispersed among the many low power television stations launched in the late 1990s and early 2000s, and currently through various digital subchannels both on full and low-power stations in the Tri-State.

The sale took nearly a year to become official, as licensing troubles with the FCC and the aforementioned complaints from foreign broadcasters would ultimately delay the transaction. Eventually, at midnight, June 30, 1996, WNYC-TV signed off for the final time. Twelve hours later, at noon on July 1, channel 31 reappeared as WBIS (branded as S+), carrying programming from the Classic Sports Network most of the day, and infomercials in overnights. Meanwhile, Dow Jones and ITT worked on their planned permanent format for WBIS, which would offer business news during the day and professional sports news and games at night. The S+ name was designed to mean "sports, stocks, style, and success", as a nod to the format being worked by both partners. Former WNYW general manager Carolyn Wall was brought on board to supervise the launch of the station in the same capacity. The launch of the new format was beset by many difficulties: initially planned for that fall, it would be ultimately delayed, as business, editorial and creative differences between both partners concerned many station employees.

The new format would ultimately launch on January 21, 1997, at 7 p.m., with a half-hour long introductory program, previewing the station's line-up and presenters. It would be followed by an NBA game between the New York Knicks and the Chicago Bulls, making the first time in 12 years a Knicks game was broadcast on over-the-air television. The launch was accompanied with a big budget ad campaign focusing on the station's slogan, "Sports, money, and, oh yeah, life," developed by Ryan Drossman & Partners (now part of MARC USA), which included outdoor advertising featuring Knicks star Larry Johnson.

The following day, the station's business news coverage from Dow Jones debuted. Produced from a street-level, all-digital studio built on the ground floor of 200 Liberty Street in the World Financial Center, business programming ran from 6 am to 6 pm, using the resources of their media outlets, including The Wall Street Journal, Barron's, Telerate and its London and Singapore-based TV outlets. Programming was tailored to the New York market and featured, alongside frequent breaking news and business updates, as well as weather and traffic reports, heavy emphasis in reporting on consumer advocacy, lifestyle and pursuits. Daily programming was anchored, among others, by New York news veterans Tony Guida and Carol Martin (hired after their controversial dismissal from WCBS-TV the year before), as well as future Fox News Channel anchor Martha MacCallum. A half-hour sports-focused business report served as a transition to the daily sports programming, running from 6 pm to 6 am.

ITT, then co-owners of Madison Square Garden (and the teams that played in the venue) with Cablevision, offered team coverage of the New York Knicks and New York Rangers, produced by their sister cable outlet MSG Network, who was by then planning a merger with Cablevision-owned SportsChannel New York. WBIS was also slated to carry some games of the New York Islanders, New Jersey Devils, and New Jersey Nets (all of which aired on SportsChannel New York), and in fact did air at least one game from each of the three teams, with production handled by MSG, using both that network's and SportsChannel personalities. Some Classic Sports Network programming remained on weekends and on evenings when there was no live sports coverage, and infomercials continued in overnights. There was some talk that WBIS would secure broadcast rights for the New York Yankees, with executives reportedly wanting all 50 broadcast games to boost the station's prominence, but that team opted to remain with WPIX (channel 11) for the 1997 season. It also became a de facto affiliate of Fox Sports Net (FSN) after signing a $30 million, five-year, split revenue deal, since at the time FSN did not have an outlet in New York; by fall 1998, Cablevision had converted its SportsChannel networks to FSN, including SportsChannel New York. As a result, WBIS carried FSN programs and events such as Big 12 Conference and Pacific-10 Conference sports, weekly Thursday night baseball games, and Fox Sports News three times a day, as well as shows from the then young Outdoor Life Network and Speedvision networks on weekends.

The WBIS hybrid format, though ambitious, was a complete flop as the station failed to attract either viewers or advertising revenue. That spring, the consumer and lifestyle talk show Money/Style/Power was canceled due to low ratings, with the station opting for reruns until disappearing altogether from the schedule. In May 1997, ITT sold its share of the station, as well as its half of Madison Square Garden, in an effort to resist a hostile takeover attempt by the Hilton Hotels Corporation, which was already hampering the company's fortunes in the run-up to the relaunch of the station (ITT would eventually merge with rival Starwood shortly thereafter). Dow Jones continued to run the station alone, but within weeks decided it could no longer support the losses, as the company was losing money thanks to the decline of its Telerate division, and looked to sell out. After early reports mentioned News Corporation was attempting to buy a stake in the station (making it a de facto sister station to WNYW), Paxson Communications (forerunner to Ion Media), which owned several UHF stations nationwide, would make a $225 million offer for WBIS, topping the 1995 sale price by $18 million.

The hybrid format was taken off the air in June, though reruns of WBIS' business programming, some FSN programming, and documentaries from the CBS cable presence "Eye on People" ran in the interim. WBIS would sign-off permanently on June 30, 1997, after airing a video sequence of the station's employees saying farewell, accompanied by Bachman–Turner Overdrive's song "Lookin' Out for #1". Paxson took control of the station the following day, renaming it as WPXN-TV, and ran channel 31 under a local marketing agreement (LMA) with a format that featured Bloomberg Business News in daytime and infomercials (from Paxson's inTV) and religious programs (from Paxson's Worship Network) the rest of the day. The LMA was necessary as Paxson was seeking FCC permission to temporarily keep both WPXN and WHAI-TV (channel 43) in Bridgeport, Connecticut. The FCC eventually granted Paxson a temporary waiver for the purchase of WPXN, which closed on March 6, 1998. A year later, Paxson sold the Bridgeport station to other interests.

On August 31, 1998, WPXN, along with the rest of the Paxson stations, premiered the new Pax television network, with a programming mix of infomercials, off-network reruns labeled as "family entertainment", and the Worship Network during overnights. NBC purchased a 32 percent stake in Pax in 1999, and as part of the deal NBC encouraged its stations, both owned and affiliated, to enter into joint sales agreements with the local Pax outlet. In New York, WNBC (channel 4) did just that with WPXN, and as a result channel 31 aired rebroadcasts of WNBC's evening newscasts. The LMA arrangements ended in July 2005; some time later, NBC sold its stake in Pax TV.

On September 11, 2001, the transmitter facilities of channel 31, as well as six other New York City television stations and several radio stations, were destroyed when two hijacked airplanes crashed into and destroyed the World Trade Center towers. When WPXN-TV returned to the air days later, channel 31 was broadcasting at low power from a temporary facility in West Orange, New Jersey. It has since moved its transmitter to the Empire State Building. On May 9, 2017, it was announced that WPXN-TV would return to broadcasting from the new One World Trade Center.

In July 2005, Pax TV changed its name to i: Independent Television, and on January 29, 2007, the network became Ion Television. Like most Ion stations, WPXN then ran infomercials until 6 p.m. daily, except for some religious shows on weekday and Sunday mornings, along with some educational shows from qubo on Friday afternoons, and Ion's collection of mostly-off-network reruns filling the prime time portion of the schedule plus one public affairs show, ION New York City.

==== Sale to Scripps ====
On September 24, 2020, the Cincinnati-based E. W. Scripps Company (which was in the process of selling WPIX to Mission Broadcasting, a partner company of Nexstar Media Group) announced that it would purchase Ion Media, including WPXN-TV's license and assets, for $2.65 billion, with financing from Berkshire Hathaway. The purchase subsequently resulted in Scripps divesting 23 Ion-owned stations in 20 other markets to Inyo Broadcast Holdings (which agreed to maintain their existing Ion affiliations as well as carry other Scripps-owned multicast networks), to allow Scripps to fully comply with the FCC local and national ownership regulations; notably, the station portfolios of Ion Media and Scripps collectively would have put the combined entity above the FCC's 37% national coverage cap without the divestitures. (Even with the pre-digital-conversion-era "UHF discount" rule – which counts UHF stations toward 50% of their total market reach – factored in, WPXN holds the largest contribution to the national cap under both groups, as New York City has the largest local market share of any U.S. television market, necessitating the spin-offs to keep it as well as the other retained properties.) The sale was completed on January 7, 2021, nearly eight days after Scripps sold WPIX to Mission Broadcasting on December 30, 2020.

== Technical information ==
=== Subchannels ===
The station's signal is multiplexed:

Subchannels of WPXN-TV
Subchannel	Res.	Short name	Programming
31.1	720p	WPXN	Ion Television
31.2	720p	Bounce	Bounce TV
31.3	480i	Grit	Grit
31.4	480i	Laff	Court TV
31.5	480i	IONPlus	Ion Plus
31.6	480i	GameSho	Game Show Central
31.7	480i	BUSTED	Busted
31.8	480i	QVC	QVC

=== Analog-to-digital conversion ===
WPXN-TV ended regular programming on its analog signal, over UHF channel 31, on June 12, 2009, as part of the federally mandated transition from analog to digital television. The station's digital signal relocated from its pre-transition UHF channel 30 to channel 31. WFUT-DT took over the channel 30 allocation as it moved its digital signal from channel 53 as a result of the phaseout of channels 52–69.

=== Former repeaters ===
WPXU-LD (channel 12) in Amityville, New York, formerly relayed WPXN-TV. This station began operation on or about May 2, 2011. It replaced WPXU-LP, an analog station on channel 38 that went dark some years earlier after its channel was reallocated to the digital signal of WWOR-TV (channel 9). On December 15, 2014, Ion reached a deal to donate WPXU-LD to Word of God Fellowship, parent company of the Daystar network.

WPXO-LP (channel 34) in East Orange, New Jersey, relayed WPXN-TV until it was sold in August 2007. It is now WNYX-LD.
