= New York Public Radio =

Non-profit organization in the US

- Type: 501(c)(3) organization
- Industry: Radio
- Founded: November 7, 1967; 58 years ago
- Headquarters: New York, New York, U.S.
- Area served: New York and New Jersey
- Key people: Christy Tanner (president, CEO); LaFontaine E. Oliver (executive chair)
- Revenue: 90,174,910 United States dollar (2017)
- Total assets: 129,854,879 United States dollar (2022)
- Website: www.nypublicradio.org

New York Public Radio (NYPR) is a New York City-based independent, publicly supported, not-for-profit media organization incorporated in 1979. Its stated mission is "To make the mind more curious, the heart more open and the spirit more joyful through excellent audio programming that is deeply rooted in New York."

The organization's services are divided into multiple brands:

- WNYC - Public radio and audio. Organized around New York City radio stations WNYC (AM) and WNYC-FM.
- WQXR - Classical music radio and audio. Organized around New York City radio station WQXR-FM.
- Gothamist - Gothamist.com website.
- New Jersey Public Radio - Public radio and audio, organized around four northern New Jersey radio stations.
- The Greene Space - Offerings of the Jerome L. Greene Performance Space, located in the SoHo section of New York City.
- WNYC Studios - Audio programming resource

The NYPR stations broadcast from studios and offices at 160 Varick Street in the Hudson Square area of Manhattan.

== History ==
=== Independence from the City ===
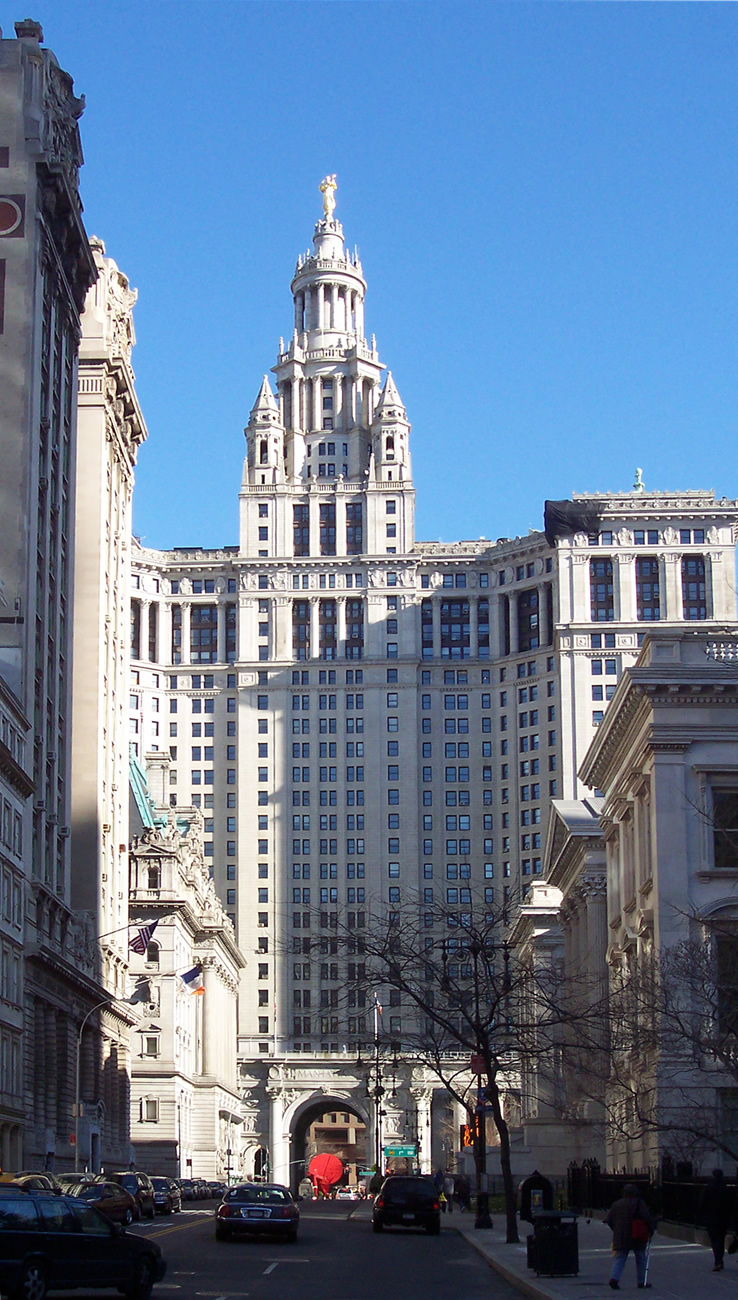
The Manhattan Municipal Building, WNYC's home from 1922 to 2008.

Shortly after assuming the mayoralty in 1994, Rudolph W. Giuliani announced he was considering selling the WNYC stations. Giuliani believed that broadcasting was no longer essential as a municipal service, and that the financial compensation from selling the stations could be used to help the City cover budget shortfalls. The final decision was made in March 1995: while the City opted to divest WNYC-TV (now WPXN-TV) through a blind auction to commercial buyers, WNYC-AM-FM was sold to the WNYC Foundation for $20 million over a six-year period, far less than what the stations could have been sold for if they were placed on the open market. While the sale put an end to the occasional political intrusions of the past, it required the WNYC Foundation to embark on a major appeal towards listeners, other foundations, and private benefactors. The station's audience and budget have continued to grow since the split from the City.

The terrorist attacks of September 11, 2001 destroyed WNYC-FM's transmitter atop the World Trade Center. WNYC-AM-FM's studios, in the nearby Manhattan Municipal Building, had to be evacuated and station staff was unable to return to its offices for three weeks. The FM signal was knocked off the air for a time. WNYC temporarily moved to studios at National Public Radio's New York bureau in midtown Manhattan, where it broadcast on its still operating AM signal transmitting from towers in Kearny, New Jersey and by a live Internet stream. The stations eventually returned to the Municipal Building and its transmitter site was relocated to the Empire State Building.

=== Move to new studios ===
On June 16, 2008, NYPR moved from its 51,400 square feet (4,780 m^{2}) of rent-free space scattered on eight floors of the Manhattan Municipal Building to a new location at 160 Varick Street, near the Holland Tunnel. The station now occupies three and a half floors of a 12-story former printing building. The new offices have 12-foot (4 m) ceilings and 71,900 square feet (6,680 m^{2}) of space. The number of recording studios and booths has doubled, to 31. There is a new 140-seat, street-level studio for live broadcasts, concerts and public forum, The Jerome L. Greene Space, and an expansion of the newsroom of over 60 journalists. Renovation, construction, rent and operating costs for the new Varick Street location amounted to $45 million. In addition to raising these funds, NYPR raised money for a one-time fund of $12.5 million to cover the cost of creating 40 more hours of new programming and three new shows. The total cost of $57.5 million for both the move and programming is nearly three times the $20 million the station had to raise over seven years to buy its licenses from the City in 1997.

=== Acquisition of WQXR-FM ===
On October 8, 2009, NYPR took control of classical music station WQXR-FM, then at 96.3 FM. WQXR-FM's intellectual property (call letters and format) was acquired from the New York Times Company as part of a three-way transaction with Univision Radio. WNYC also purchased the 105.9 FM frequency of Univision's WCAA (now WXNY-FM). WQXR-FM's classical format moved to 105.9 and WXNY's Spanish Tropical format debuted at 96.3. The deal resulted in WQXR-FM becoming a non-commercial station. With WQXR as a 24-hour classical station, WNYC-FM dropped its remaining evening classical music programming to become a full-time news/talk station.

=== New Jersey expansion ===
On June 6, 2011, the New Jersey Public Broadcasting Authority agreed to sell four FM stations in northern New Jersey to New York Public Radio. The transaction was announced by Governor Chris Christie, as part of his long-term goal to end State-subsidized public broadcasting. The four stations were previously the northern half of New Jersey Network's statewide radio service, with the stations in southern New Jersey going to Philadelphia public radio station WHYY-FM. Upon taking control of the four stations on July 1, 2011, they were rebranded as New Jersey Public Radio.

The four New Jersey Radio stations are collectively referred to as New Jersey Public Radio. They are a group of four northern New Jersey noncommercial FM stations acquired by New York Public Radio from the New Jersey Public Broadcasting Authority on July 1, 2011.

New Jersey Public Radio news content comes from the WNYC newsroom as well as from a growing network of partners in the New Jersey News Service.

=== Gothamist acquisition ===
In late 2017, the website network including Gothamist, LAist, and DCist ceased operations. Three months later, in February 2018, anonymous donors funded a joint purchase of the properties by radio stations KPCC, WAMU, and WNYC, which would each operate the publication relevant to their broadcast region.

== Leadership ==
In 2023, LaFontaine E. Oliver became president and CEO of NY Public Radio. He succeeded interim President and CEO Cynthia King Vance, who succeeded journalist Goli Sheikholeslami, when she became CEO of Politico. Oliver joined the organization from Your Public Radio Corp., which owns WYPR and WTMD in Baltimore.

Sheikholeslami succeeded Laura R. Walker, who had led the organization since 1995. Under Walker's leadership, WNYC AM and FM grew from a monthly audience of 1 million and a budget of $8 million with $11.8 million in annual fund-raising to a monthly audience of 26 million and an annual budget of $100 million with $52 million in annual fund-raising.

In 2021, attorney Timothy A. Wilkins was named as chairman of the board of trustees. As of 2018, the organization had 37 trustees.

NYPR has been an early adopter of new technologies including HD radio, live audio streaming, and podcasting. RSS feeds and email newsletters link to archived audio of individual program segments.

In February 2026, the organization announced Christy Tanner as its new CEO. Tanner succeeded LaFontaine E. Oliver, who became the organization's executive chair.

== Financing ==
NYPR reported a total revenue of $68,038,410 for the tax year ending June 30, 2015, in their last IRS Form 990 Income Tax Statement filing.

New York Public Radio Financial Information
Calendar Year	Total Revenue
2014	$68,038,410
2013	$68,712,094
2012	$61,302,388
2011	$54,810,073
2010	$53,448,885
2009	$54,860,056
2008	$56,233,846
2007	$46,685,724

== See also ==
- WPXN-TV (channel 31, formerly WNYC-TV)
- Media in New York City
- New Jersey Public Radio
