= WQXR-FM =

Classical music public radio station in Newark, New Jersey (New York City)

- Newark, New Jersey; United States
- Broadcast area: North Jersey; New York City
- Frequency: 105.9 MHz (HD Radio)
- Branding: Classical New York 105.9 WQXR

Programming
- Language: English
- Format: Classical music
- Subchannels: HD2: New Sounds

Ownership
- Owner: New York Public Radio
- Sister stations: WNYC; WNYC-FM; WQXW; New Jersey Public Radio

History
- First air date: July 15, 1962
- Former call signs: WCOM (1961–1962); WHBI (1962–1985); WNWK (1985–1998); WCAA (1998–2007); WQBU-FM (2007); WCAA (2007–2009)
- Call sign meaning: Originally used on the former WQXR (1560 AM), now WFME

Technical information
- Licensing authority: FCC
- Facility ID: 46978
- Class: B1
- ERP: 610 watts (analog); 29 watts (digital)
- HAAT: 416 meters (1,365 ft)
- Transmitter coordinates: 40°44′54.4″N 73°59′8.5″W
- Translator: 103.7 W279AJ (Highland)
- Repeaters: 90.3 WQXW (Ossining); 93.9 WNYC-FM HD2 (New York)

Links
- Public license information: Public file; LMS
- Webcast: Listen live; Listen live (HD2)
- Website: www.wqxr.org; www.newsounds.org (HD2)

WQXR-FM (105.9 FM) is an American non-commercial classical radio station, licensed to Newark, New Jersey, and serving the North Jersey and New York City area. It is owned by the nonprofit organization New York Public Radio (NYPR), which also operates WNYC (AM), WNYC-FM and the four-station New Jersey Public Radio group. WQXR-FM broadcasts from studios and offices located in the Hudson Square neighborhood in lower Manhattan and its transmitter is located at the Empire State Building. The station is the core audio service for NYPR's WQXR brand.

The current WQXR-FM is its second FM incarnation in the New York City area. The first WQXR-FM in turn traced its history to an earlier New York City station, WQXR, which broadcast on the AM band. Both of these earlier stations were commercial operations, broadcasting classical music and known as "the radio station of The New York Times". New York Public Radio acquired the WQXR-FM branding on July 14, 2009, as part of a three-way trade which also involved The New York Times Company—the previous owners of WQXR-FM—and Univision Radio. As a result of the deal, WQXR-FM became a non-commercial public radio station on a new FM frequency, now operated by New York Public Radio. Financial support includes three on-air pledge drives a year.

WQXR-FM's main programming is also carried by translator station W279AJ, 103.7 FM in Highland, New York, simulcast on WNYC-FM's 93.9 FM HD2 subchannel, and carried over Time Warner Cable television channel 590 in the Hudson Valley, New York. On July 29, 2013, programming began to be simulcast on the former WDFH, now WQXW, 90.3 FM in Ossining, New York, covering northern and central Westchester County. WQXR-FM's standard programming is streamed on its webcast.

Additional programming includes New Sounds Radio, focusing on classical works by living composers, which is both streamed and broadcast over WQXR-FM's HD2 subchannel. A streaming-only channel, Operavore, dedicated to opera music, was launched in 2012.

== History ==
=== Original WQXR operations ===
WQXR-FM is the outgrowth of a "high-fidelity" AM station, WQXR. This station was founded as experimental station W2XR by John V. L. Hogan and Elliott Sanger, and began operating in New York City on March 26, 1929, as a mechanical television station. In conjunction with the television transmissions, the station commonly broadcast classical music. In 1936 it was converted into a standard AM broadcast station at 1560 kHz, licensed to New York City with the call letters WQXR.

One of the listeners was the inventor of wide band FM, Edwin Howard Armstrong. When Armstrong put his experimental FM station, W2XMN, on the air, he arranged to rebroadcast some of WQXR's programming. This ended in 1939, when Hogan and Sanger put their own experimental FM station on the air, W2XQR, just down the dial from Armstrong at 42.3 MHz. In 1941, the station began transmitting from the top of the Chanin Building, where it remained until 1965 when it moved to the top of the Empire State Building. Remnants of the original tower remain on the Chanin Building.

The Federal Communications Commission (FCC) began licensing commercial FM stations in 1941, and W2XQR moved to 45.9 MHz, becoming W59NY. Effective November 1, 1943, the FCC modified its policy for FM call letters, and the station became WQXQ.

==== "The radio station of the New York Times" (1944–2009) ====
In 1944, Hogan and Sanger sold their holding company, Interstate Broadcasting Company, to the New York Times Company. When the FM broadcast band was moved from 42 to 50 MHz to its present frequency range of 88–108 MHz in 1945, WQXQ moved to 97.7 MHz. In early 1948 the call letters were changed to WQXR-FM, and its frequency, home of WQXR-FM for the next 64 years, to 96.3 MHz.

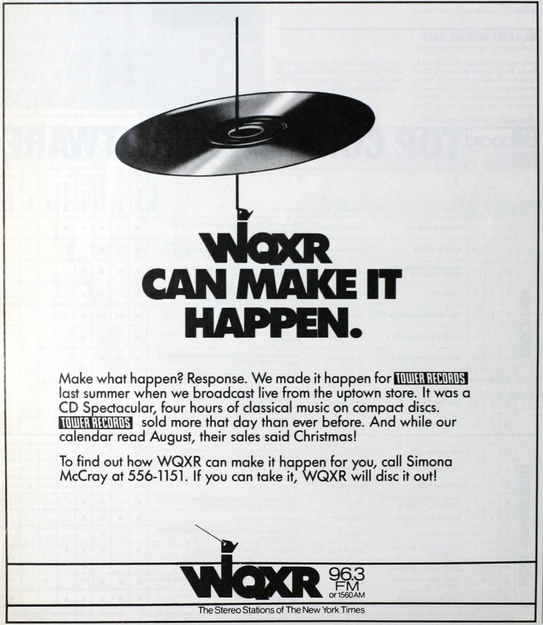
A 1986 advertisement for the station featuring a logo displaying both its FM and AM frequencies

WQXR was the first AM station in New York to experiment with broadcasting in stereo, beginning in 1952. During some of its live concerts, it used two microphones positioned six feet (two meters) apart. The microphone on the right led to its AM feed, and the one on the left to its FM feed, so a listener could position two radios with the same separation, one tuned to 1560 and the other to 96.3, and listen in stereo.

During the 1950s, WQXR-FM's programming was also heard on the Rural Radio Network on several stations in Upstate New York, including ones targeting Buffalo, Rochester, Syracuse and Albany. This ended when the RRN stations were sold to Pat Robertson's Christian Broadcasting Network. Both the AM and FM sides continued to simulcast each other until 1965, when the FCC began requiring commonly owned AM and FM stations in large markets to broadcast separate programming for at least part of the day. WQXR-FM concentrated on longer classical works, while WQXR (AM) aired lighter classical music and talk programs produced in conjunction with The New York Times. While this plan gave classical music fans two options, it also increased expenses for the stations.

In 1962, the QXR network was purchased by Novo Industrial Corporation but the WQXR stations remained under the New York Times Company ownership.

After briefly attempting to sell the WQXR stations in 1971, The New York Times was able to get a waiver of the simulcasting rules. The stations continued to duplicate each other until 1992, when the AM side changed its programming from classical to popular standards, becoming WQEW (now WFME). In 1998, the Times entered into a long-term lease for WQEW with ABC, a move which brought Radio Disney to New York City. The Times Company also included a purchase clause in the lease contract, and ABC exercised the option in 2007. This left WQXR-FM as the Times's lone radio station and, following a sale of its group of television stations to Local TV LLC that same year, the Times Company's sole broadcasting property.

=== Operations on 105.9 MHz ===
The facility on 105.9 MHz, taken over by New York Public Radio in 2009, has a history dating back to the early 1960s. On September 19, 1961, following competitive hearings, an Initial Decision was issued recommending approval of an application from the Cosmopolitan Broadcasting Company for a new station, located in Newark, New Jersey on 105.9 MHz. A Construction Permit for the station, which was initially assigned the call letters WCOM, was granted on November 8, 1961, and the station's debut took place on July 15, 1962. On July 30, 1962, WCOM's call sign was changed to WHBI, inheriting the call letters of a New York City station at 1280 AM, whose license had been voluntarily canceled twelve days earlier.

In 1972, WHBI's 1969 application for license renewal was designated for an FCC hearing, to determine whether the owners were qualified to remain as licensees. A July 25, 1974, Initial Decision recommended against renewal. This recommendation was formally adopted on May 19, 1976, after finding that "Cosmopolitan had operated its broadcast facility so as virtually to relinquish all interest and control over the station's programming", and "As a result of its abdication of licensee responsibility, numerous violations of Commission Rules occurred, including (but not limited to) the promotion of a lottery, false and misleading advertising, improper logging, failure to meet filing requirements, and inadequate record keeping".

The FCC conducted hearings in order to award an Interim Operation authorization to run the station until a new permanent licensee was chosen. In 1982 the Global Broadcasting Group was selected as the interim operator. On April 20, 1985, the station call letters were changed to WNWK.

Additional comparative hearings were held to determine the station's new permanent licensee. This was awarded to Multicultural Radio Broadcasting, Inc., which assumed operations on August 20, 1992. On May 27, 1998, the station call letters were changed to WCAA. On February 13, 2007, the call sign became WQBU-FM, but was changed back to WCAA ten days later.

==== Frequency swap and sale to New York Public Radio (2009) ====
WQXR's final logo at 96.3 FM

WQXR's first logo as WQXR 105.9fm

On July 14, 2009, the New York Times Company announced it was transferring the license for WQXR-FM on 96.3 FM to Univision Radio, in exchange for the license for Univision's WCAA on 105.9 MHz, with the sale slated to close in the second half of 2009. This exchange included a third party, WNYC Radio, which would take over operations of 105.9 FM from the Times, now as a non-commercial station. Univision paid the New York Times Company $33.5 million for the license for 96.3 MHz, and WNYC Radio paid the New York Times Company $11.5 million for 105.9 FM's license, equipment, and the WQXR call letters, music library and website.

The changes took place at 8:00 p.m. on October 8, 2009. Univision took over operation of the 96.3 FM facility, and changed its call letters from WQXR-FM to WCAA, which was then changed a week later to WXNY-FM. At the same time, the WQXR-FM call letters were moved to the former WCAA at 105.9 FM, with the station becoming a non-commercial radio station run by New York Public Radio. The last music played on 96.3 MHz was a live recording of "West Side Story" - Symphonic Dances: 4. Mambo of Leonard Bernstein. The first music played on 105.9 MHz was a live broadcast of Dumbarton Oaks of Igor Stravinsky performed by the Orpheus Chamber Orchestra at Carnegie Hall.

Although classical music under the WQXR-FM call letters continued to be broadcast for the greater New York City region after the transfer, the 105.9 FM facility has less range and population coverage than the previous operation on 96.3 FM. After the frequency swap, WQXR-FM transmissions continued to originate from the master antenna atop the Empire State Building. However, the former signal was 6,000 watts ERP (effective radiated power—the energy concentrated toward the horizon), with the new signal reduced to 610 watts. For comparison, the calculated signal strength on 105.9 FM at a distance of 30 miles (48 km, covering approximately 14.5 million people) is less than the 96.3 FM's signal at 50 miles (80 km, covering approximately 17.1 million people). Further limiting coverage is Hartford's WHCN, which also broadcasts on 105.9 MHz. Although WHCN has a directional antenna with a reduced signal toward WQXR's transmitter, the two stations interfere with each other where their signals overlap.

A translator station on 96.7 FM in Asbury Park, New Jersey previously relayed WQXR's programming, until the owner sold it and it was moved out of Asbury Park, meaning WQXR could no longer broadcast at that frequency.

== See also ==
- 1939 in radio
- List of radio stations in New Jersey
- List of radio stations in New York
- Media in New York City
