= John Hour =

Public naming of male customers of female prostitutes

The John Hour refers to the public naming of "johns" (male customers of female prostitutes).

In October 1979, New York City mayor Ed Koch instructed WNYC, the city's public radio station, to read the names of convicted "johns". Koch intended to use this public shaming, swiftly dubbed "The John Hour", as a tool to reduce prostitution.

The first John Hour was broadcast on WNYC on October 23, 1979, read by announcer Joe Rice; it was also read on WMCA and published in the New York Daily News. An uproar ensued. On October 26, The New York Times editorialized:

"This week's premiere of Mayor Koch's 'John Hour,' which broadcast the names of nine convicted customers of prostitutes, was a shabby show, in no way redeemed by its brevity. It took only about a minute for city-employed announcers to read the names over city-owned radio and television stations. But it was a mighty misuse of government power."

After one broadcast, "The John Hour" was discontinued.

In March 2008, New York governor Eliot Spitzer was exposed as a customer of a high-priced prostitution ring. In the wake of this scandal, Koch advocated reinstating "The John Hour".
