= English auction =

Type of dynamic auction

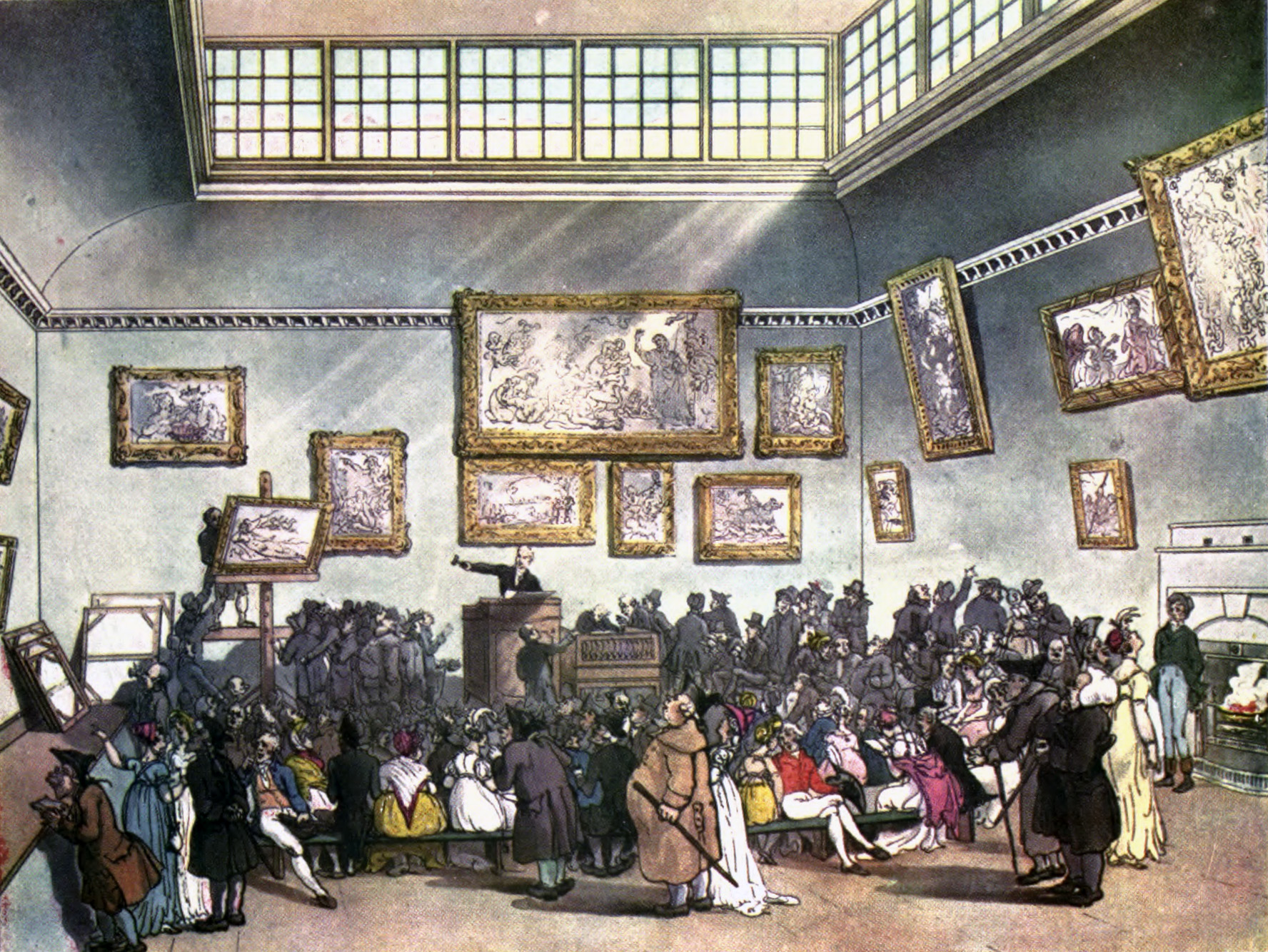
Auction Room, Christie's

An English auction is an open-outcry ascending dynamic auction. It proceeds as follows.

- The auctioneer opens the auction by announcing a suggested opening bid, a starting price, or a reserve for the item on sale.
- Then the auctioneer accepts increasingly higher bids from the floor and sometimes from other sources, for example online or telephone bids. The auctioneer usually determines the minimum increment of bids, often making them larger as bidding reaches higher levels.
- The highest bidder at any given moment is considered to have the standing bid, which can only be displaced by a higher bid from a competing buyer.
- If no competing bidder challenges the standing bid within the time allowed by the auctioneer, the standing bid becomes the winner, and the item is sold to the highest bidder at a price equal to their bid.
- If no bidder accepts the starting price, the auctioneer either begins to lower the starting price in increments, or bidders are allowed to bid prices lower than the starting price, or the item is not sold at all, according to the wishes of the seller or protocols of the auction house.

The English auction is different from other auction systems in its most essential feature: the public bidding process can transmit information to bidders in real-time because it can potentially realize the sharing of private information. By introducing the common value factor, the English auction has a revenue advantage: each bidder's private information about the common value is valuable information to the other bidders, and this information is disclosed during the public bidding process.

Unlike sealed-bid auctions (such as first-price sealed-bid auction or Vickrey auction), an English auction is "open" or fully transparent, as the identity (or at least the existence) of all bidders and their bids is disclosed to each other during the auction. More generally, an auction mechanism is considered "English" if it involves an iterative process of adjusting the price in a direction that is unfavorable to the bidders (increasing in price if the item is being sold to competing buyers or decreasing in price in a reverse auction with competing sellers). In contrast, a Dutch auction would adjust the price in a direction that favored the bidders (lowering the price if the item is being sold to competing buyers, increasing it, if it is a reverse auction).

When the auction involves a single item for sale and each participant has as an independent private value for the item auctioned, the expected payment and expected revenues of an English auction is theoretically equivalent to that of the Vickrey auction, and both mechanisms have weakly dominant strategies. Both the Vickrey and English auction, although very different procedurally, award the item to the bidder with the highest value at a price equal to the value of the second highest bidder.

== Variations ==
There are many variations on this auction system. Sometimes, the reserve price is not revealed. Also, bids may be made with signals instead of being called out. Such signals can include tugging an ear or raising a bidding paddle. Another variation on the English auction is the open-exit auction, where the bidders must announce that they are dropping out of the bidding and they cannot re-enter. In France, when the last bid has been made in an auction for an art object, a representative of the state can say "Préemption de l'état" ("Pre-emption of the state") and buy the object for the highest bid. Some housing cooperatives similarly allow members of the cooperative to pre-empt any buyer of a house constructed by the cooperative.

=== Scottish auction ===
In a Scottish auction (or also time-interval auction), all bidding should be completed within a certain time interval. This ruling provides the bidders an appropriate amount of time for consideration. Speed is not important in this type of auction.

=== Candle auction ===
A candle auction is a variation in which the end of the auction is signaled by the expiration of a candle flame. This was intended to ensure that no one could know exactly when the auction would end and make a last-second bid.

=== Japanese auction ===
A Japanese auction is a variant in which the current price changes continuously according to the auctioneer's clock, rather than by bidders' outcries. Bidders can only decide if and when to exit the arena. At first glance, this seems equivalent to English auction: apparently, in an English auction, it is a dominant strategy for each buyer whose price is above the displayed price, to always bid the minimal allowed increment (e.g. one cent) above the displayed price, so the price should increase continuously. However, in real-life English auctions, jump bidding is often observed: buyers increase the displayed price much more than the minimal allowed increment. By its nature, jump-bidding is not possible in a Japanese auction. This may be seen as either an advantage or a disadvantage of the English auction format.

=== Selling more than one item ===
The English auction has variants for selling multiple identical items or multiple different items.

=== Vickrey auction ===
Vickrey auction is also known as second-price sealed-bid auction. None of the bidders know what the other is offering. The bidder with the highest price wins, but only pays the value of the next highest bid. The most important feature of these auctions is that each bidder's winning strategy is to bid according to their true valuation of the item; this auction mechanism is thus incentive-compatible. It is also a Pareto efficient allocation mechanism.
