= New Sounds (radio program) =

Radio program

New Sounds is a radio program on WNYC that features contemporary and world music. Hosted by John Schaefer, the program has been running since 1982.

Laurie Anderson was the show's very first guest. It was possibly the first radio program to play Philip Glass's 1984 opera Akhnaten. The Bang on a Can collective has been featured on the show since its early days.

In 2019, WNYC announced that New Sounds was being cut from the station. After the announcement there was an immediate uproar by both longtime listeners and WNYC staffers. After considering the protests, WNYC management relented and pledged to continue the program.

In 2022, the program celebrated 40 years of production.

In February 2025 WNYC once again announced that New Sounds would be cut from the station. The program was saved after over 1,000 listeners donated over $1.5 million.
