= First-price sealed-bid auction =

Auction where all participants concurrently submit undisclosed bids

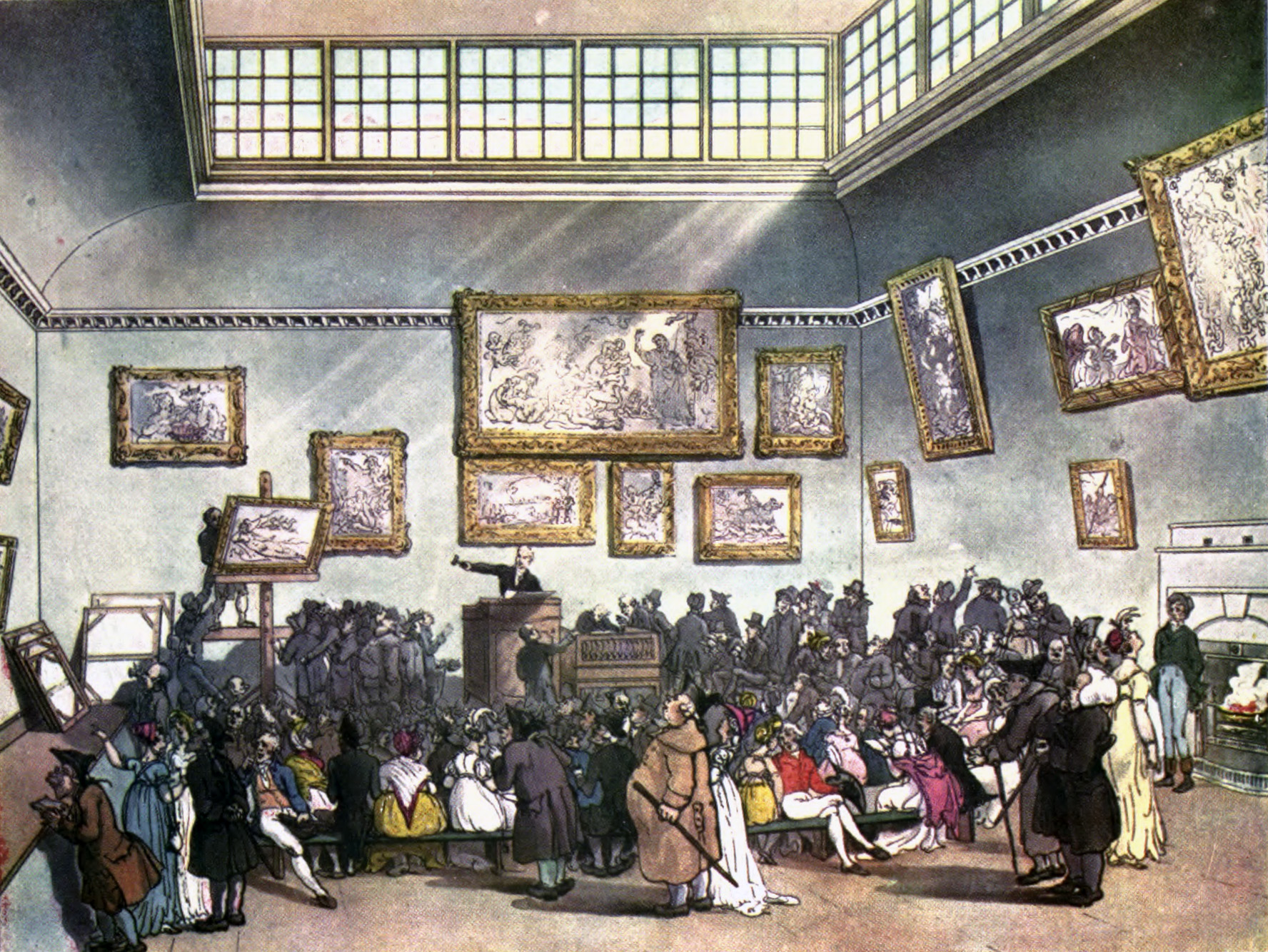
Auction Room, Christie's, London

A first-price sealed-bid auction (FPSBA) is a common type of auction. It is also known as blind auction. In this type of auction, all bidders simultaneously submit sealed bids so that no bidder knows the bid of any other participant. The highest bidder pays the price that was submitted.

== Strategic analysis ==
In a FPSBA, each bidder is characterized by their monetary valuation of the item for sale.

Suppose Alice is a bidder and her valuation is $a$. Then, if Alice is rational:

- She will never bid more than $a$, because bidding more than $a$ can only make her lose net value.
- If she bids exactly $a$, then she will not lose but also not gain any positive value.
- If she bids less than $a$, then she may have some positive gain, but the exact gain depends on the bids of the others.

Alice would like to bid the smallest amount that can make her win the item, as long as this amount is less than $a$. For example, if there is another bidder Bob and he bids $y$ and $y<a$, then Alice would like to bid $y+\varepsilon$ (where $\varepsilon$ is the smallest amount that can be added, e.g. one cent).

Unfortunately, Alice does not know what the other bidders are going to bid. Moreover, she does not even know the valuations of the other bidders. Hence, strategically, we have a Bayesian game - a game in which agents do not know the payoffs of the other agents.

The interesting challenge in such a game is to find a Bayesian Nash equilibrium. However, this is not easy even when there are only two bidders. The situation is simpler when the valuations of the bidders are independent and identically distributed random variables, so that the valuations are all drawn from a known prior distribution.

=== Example ===
Suppose there are two bidders, Alice and Bob, whose valuations $a$ and $b$ are drawn from a continuous uniform distribution over the interval [0,1]. Then, it is a Bayesian-Nash equilibrium when each bidder bids exactly half his/her value: Alice bids $a/2$ and Bob bids $b/2$.

PROOF: The proof takes the point-of-view of Alice. We assume that she knows that Bob bids $f(b) = b/2$, but she does not know $b$. We find the best response of Alice to Bob's strategy. Suppose Alice bids $x$. There are two cases:

- $x\geq f(b)$. Then Alice wins and enjoys a net gain of $a-x$. This happens with probability $f^{-1}(x)=2x$.
- $x<f(b)$. Then Alice loses and her net gain is 0. This happens with probability $1-f^{-1}(x)$.

All in all, Alice's expected gain is: $G(x) = f^{-1}(x)\cdot(a-x)$. The maximum gain is attained when $G'(x)=0$. The derivative is (see Inverse functions and differentiation):

$$G'(x) = - f^{-1}(x) + (a-x)\cdot {1 \over f'(f^{-1}(x))}$$

and it is zero when Alice's bid $x$ satisfies:

$$f^{-1}(x) = (a-x)\cdot {1 \over f'(f^{-1}(x))}$$

Now, since we are looking for a symmetric equilibrium, we also want Alice's bid $x$ to equal $f(a)$. So we have:

$$f^{-1}(f(a)) = (a-f(a))\cdot {1 \over f'(f^{-1}(f(a)))}$$
$$a = (a-f(a))\cdot {1 \over f'(a)}$$
$$a f'(a) = (a-f(a))$$

The solution of this differential equation is: $f(a) = a/2$.

=== Generalization ===
Denote by:

- $v_i$ – the valuation of bidder $i$;
- $y_i$ – the maximum valuation of all bidders except $i$, i.e., $y_i = \max_{j\neq i}{v_j}$.

Then, a FPSBA has a unique symmetric BNE in which the bid of player $i$ is given by:

$$E[y_i \mid y_i < v_i]$$

== Incentive-compatible variant ==
The FPSBA is not incentive-compatible even in the weak sense of Bayesian-Nash-Incentive-Compatibility (BNIC), since there is no Bayesian-Nash equilibrium in which bidders report their true value.

However, it is easy to create a variant of FPSBA which is BNIC, if the priors on the valuations are common knowledge. For example, for the case of Alice and Bob described above, the rules of the BNIC variant are:

- The highest bidder wins;
- The highest bidder pays 1/2 of his/her bid.

In effect, this variant simulates the Bayesian-Nash equilibrium strategies of the players, so in the Bayesian-Nash equilibrium, both bidders bid their true value.

This example is a special case of a much more general principle: the revelation principle.

== Comparison to second-price auction ==
The following table compares FPSBA to sealed-bid second-price auction (SPSBA):

Auction:	First-price	Second-price
Winner:	Agent with highest bid	Agent with highest bid
Winner pays:	Winner's bid	Second-highest bid
Loser pays:	0	0
Dominant strategy:	No dominant strategy	Bidding truthfully is dominant strategy
Bayesian Nash equilibrium	Bidder $i$ bids $\frac{n-1}{n}v_i$	Bidder $i$ truthfully bids $v_i$
Auctioneer's revenue	$\frac{n-1}{n+1}$	$\frac{n-1}{n+1}$

The auctioneer's revenue is calculated in the example case, in which the valuations of the agents are drawn independently and uniformly at random from [0,1]. As an example, when there are $n=2$ agents:

- In a first-price auction, the auctioneer receives the maximum of the two equilibrium bids, which is $\max(a/2,b/2)$.
- In a second-price auction, the auctioneer receives the minimum of the two truthful bids, which is $\min(a,b)$.

In both cases, the auctioneer's expected revenue is 1/3.

This fact that the revenue is the same is not a coincidence - it is a special case of the revenue equivalence theorem. This holds only when the agents' valuations are statistically independent; when the valuations are dependent, we have a common value auction, and in this case, the revenue in a second-price auction is usually higher than in a first-price auction.

The item for sale may not be sold if the final bid is not high enough to satisfy the seller, that is, the seller reserves the right to accept or reject the highest bid. If the seller announces to the bidders the reserve price, it is a public reserve price auction. In contrast, if the seller does not announce the reserve price before the sale but only after the sale, it is a secret reserve price auction.

== Comparison to other auctions ==
A FPSBA is distinct from the English auction in that bidders can only submit one bid each. Furthermore, as bidders cannot see the bids of other participants, they cannot adjust their own bids accordingly.

FPSBA has been argued to be strategically equivalent to the Dutch auction.

What are effectively FPSBA are commonly called tendering for procurement by companies and organizations, particularly for government contracts and auctions for mining leases. FPSBA are thought to lead to low procurement costs through competition and low corruption through increased transparency, even though they may entail a higher ex-post extra cost of the completed project and extra time to complete it.

A generalized first-price auction is a non-truthful auction mechanism for sponsored search (aka position auction).

A generalization of both 1st-price and 2nd-price auctions is an auction in which the price is some convex combination of the 1st and 2nd price.
