= Ambush =

Military attack from concealed positions

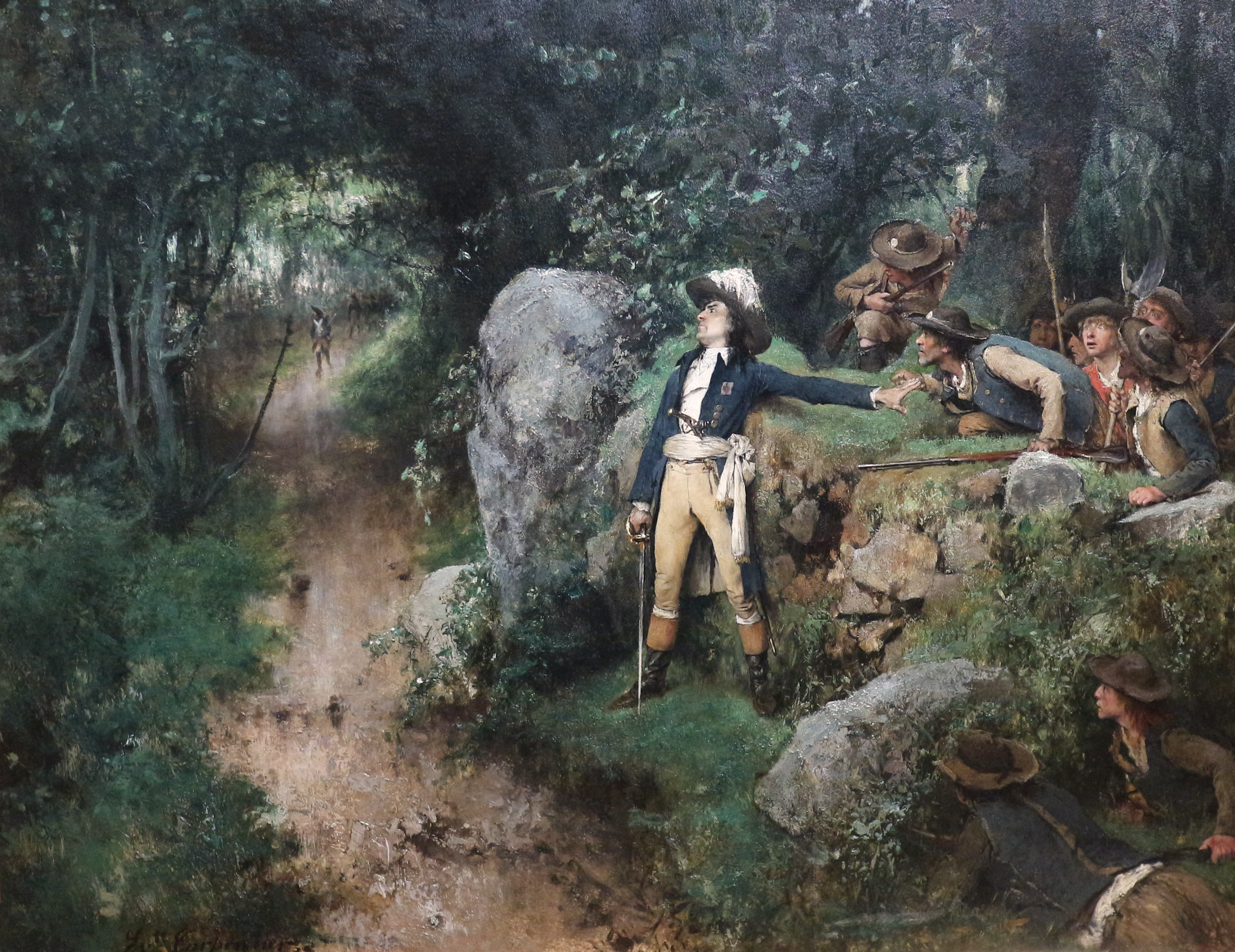
Évariste Carpentier painting Chouans in Ambush at the Battle of La Gravelle (1889) of French Royalist rebels preparing an ambush during the War in the Vendée (1793)

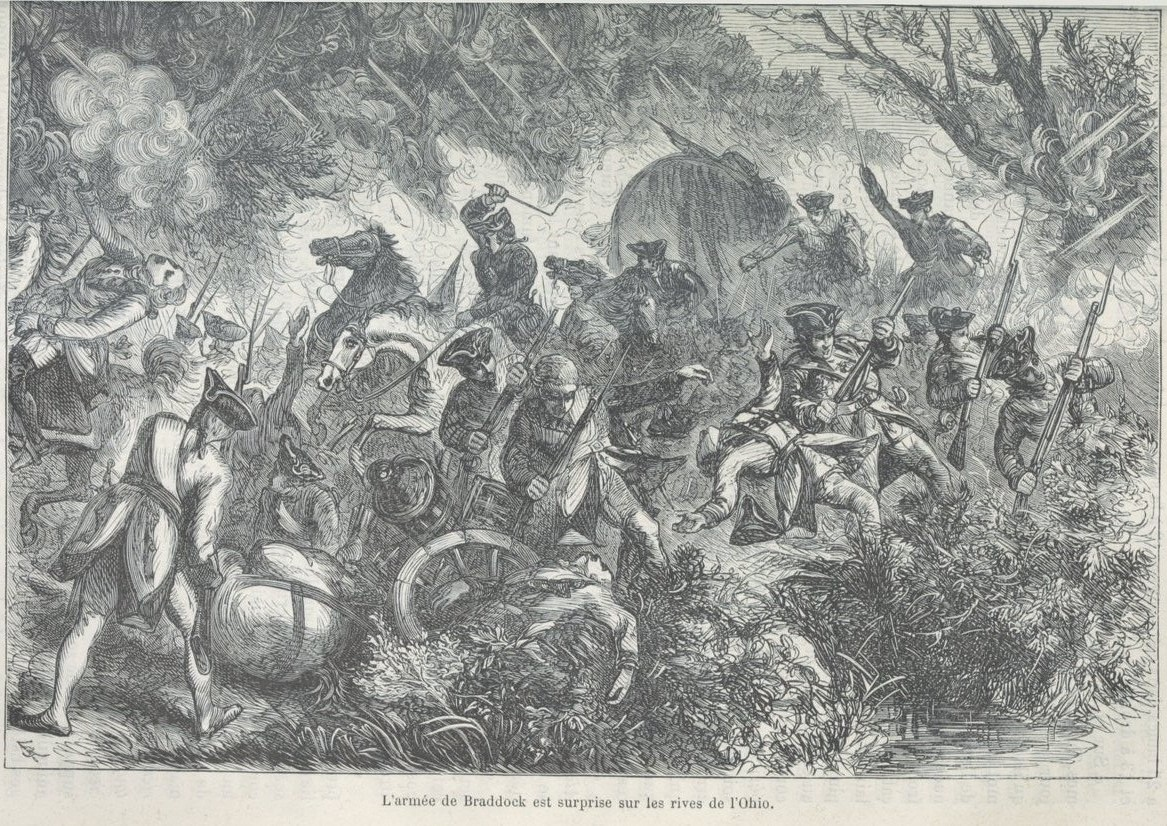
General Braddock's troops ambushed and decimated by the French and Indians in 1755

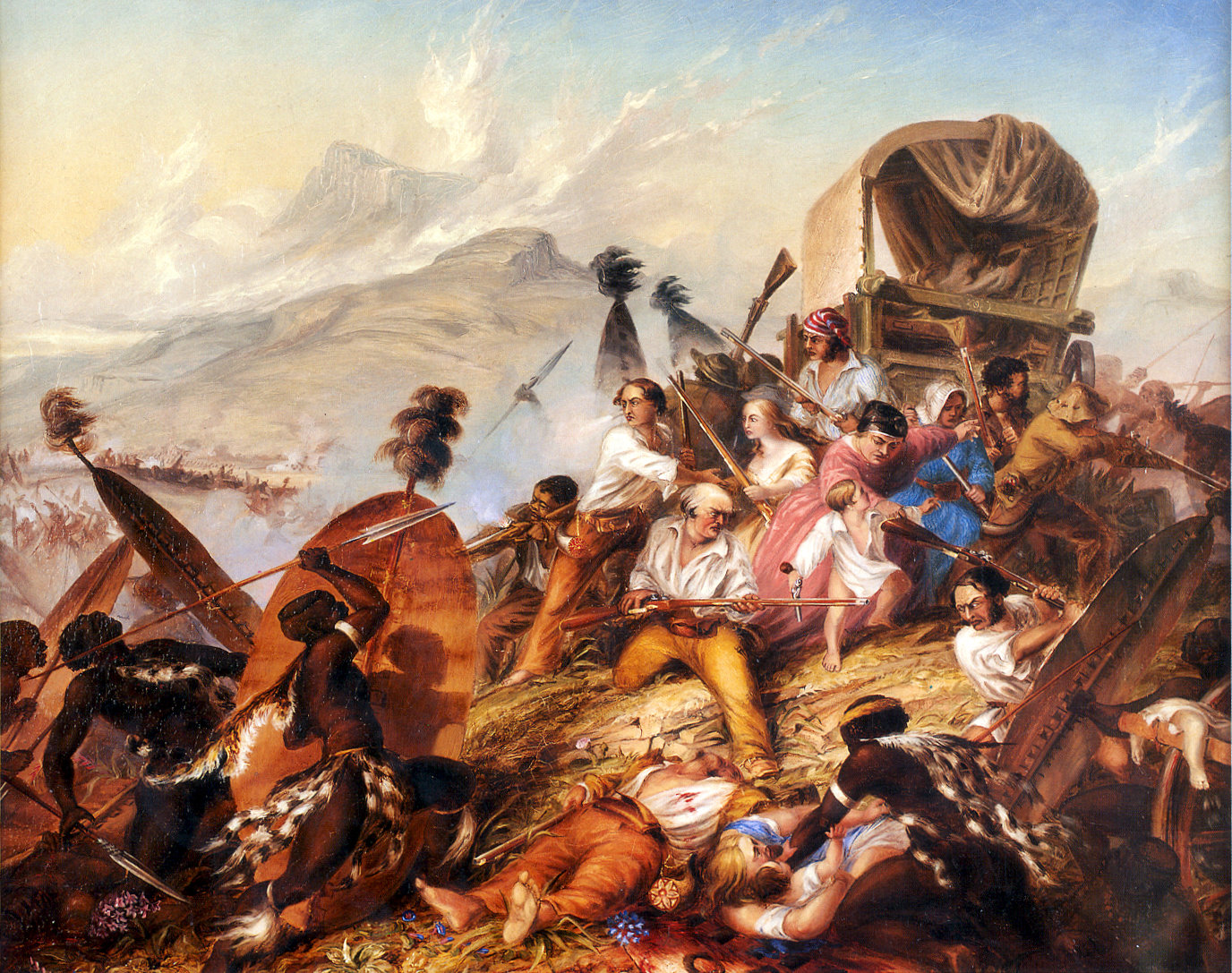
Depiction of a Zulu attack on a Boer camp in February 1838

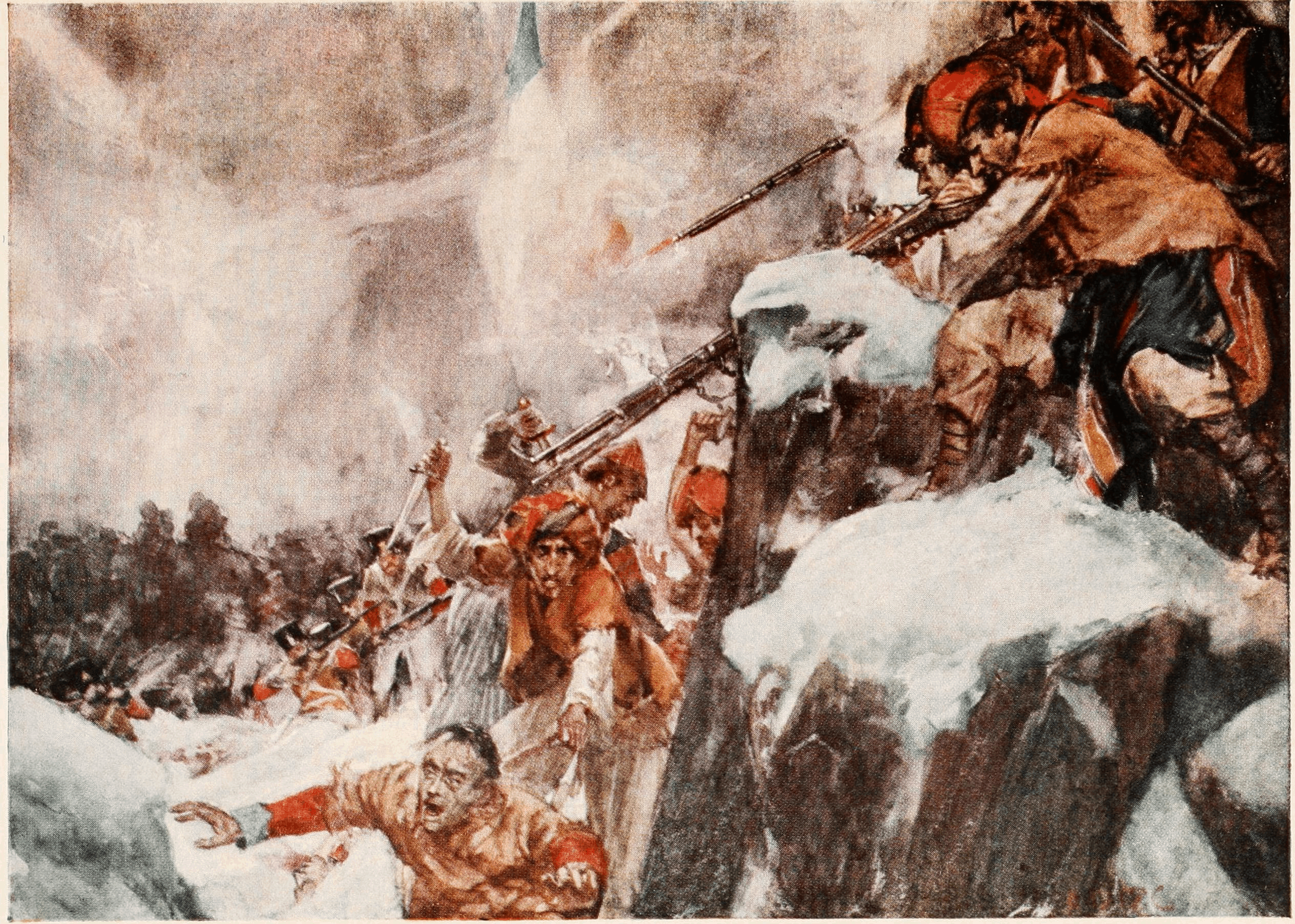
Massacre of Elphinstone's army during the First Anglo-Afghan War in 1842

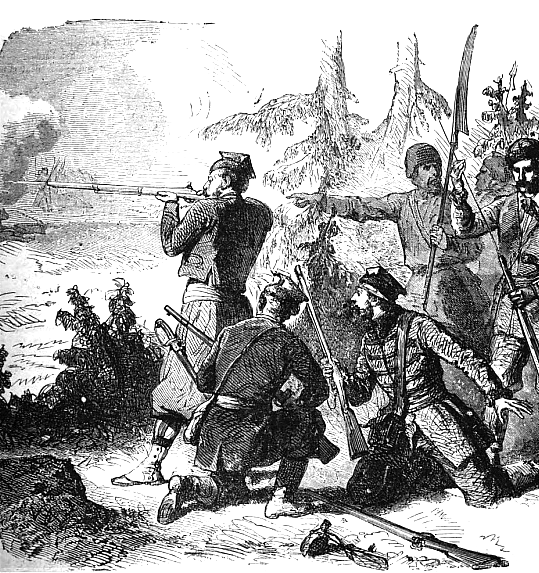
Ambush of Polish partisans against Russian forces during the January Uprising, 1863

An ambush is a surprise attack carried out by combatants waiting in a concealed (and typically well-defiladed) position against an approaching or temporarily halted enemy individual or group. The concealed position itself or the concealed person(s) may also be called an "ambush", and the chosen area to carry out the ambush is known as the kill zone or the trap.

The term "ambush" is also used in animal behavior studies to describe the predation strategy of some carnivores using stealth and deception (i.e. ambush predators), in sociology to describe aggressive journalistic practices (i.e. ambush journalism), and in economics to describe some marketing strategies (i.e. ambush marketing), all of which involve an element of surprise upon the recipients.

Ambushes as a basic fighting tactic of soldiers, law enforcement or criminals have been used consistently throughout history, from ancient to modern warfare. Prior to the 20th century, a military ambush might involve thousands of soldiers as part of an annihilation battle, usually at a choke point such as a mountain pass, where the targets are forced to travel through limited routes in vulnerable formations and the surrounding topography (usually high grounds) provide the ambushers concealment and advantage of terrain. Conversely, ambushes could also involve a small irregular band or insurgent group attacking a larger regular armed force, usually using harassment, sabotage or assassination attacks as part of a larger attritional strategy. In recent centuries, a military ambush can involve the exclusive or combined use of improvised explosive devices (IED). This allows attackers to hit enemy convoys or patrols while minimizing the risk of being exposed to return fire.

== History ==
The use of ambush tactics by early people dates as far back as two million years, when anthropologists have recently suggested that ambush techniques were used to hunt large game.

One example is the Battle of the Trebia River, where Hannibal encamped within striking distance of the Romans with the Trebia River between them, and placed a strong force of cavalry and infantry in concealment, near the battle zone. While the Roman infantry became entangled in combat with his main army, the hidden force attacked the Roman infantry in the rear, leading to the Roman defeat.

Ambushes were widely used by the Lusitanians, in particular by their chieftain Viriathus. Their usual tactic, called concursare, involved repeatedly charging and retreating, forcing the enemy to eventually give them chase, to set up ambushes in difficult terrain where allied forces would be waiting. In his first victory, he eluded the siege of Roman praetor Gaius Vetilius and attracted him to a narrow pass next to the Barbesuda river, where he destroyed Gaius Vetilius's army and killed the praetor. Viriathus's ability to turn chases into ambushes would grant him victories over a number of Roman generals.

Another Lusitanian ambush was performed by Curius and Apuleius on Roman general Quintus Fabius Maximus Servilianus, who led a numerically superior army complete with war elephants and Numidian cavalry. The ambush allowed Curius and Apuleius to steal Servilianus's loot train. However, a tactic error in their retreat led to the Romans retaking the train and putting the Lusitanians to flight. Viriathus later defeated Servilianus with a surprise attack.

Germanic war chief Arminius sprung an ambush against the Romans at Battle of the Teutoburg Forest, affecting the course of Western history. The Germanic forces demonstrated several principles needed for a successful ambush. They took cover in difficult forested terrain, allowing the warriors time and space to mass without detection. They had the element of surprise, aided by the defection of Arminius from Roman ranks prior to the battle. They sprang the attack when the Romans were most vulnerable: when they had left their fortified camp, and were on the march in a rainstorm.

The Germans attacked quickly, using a series of rapid charges against the length of the Roman line, with charging units sometimes withdrawing to the forest to regroup while others took their place. The Germans also used blocking obstacles, erecting a trench and earthen wall to hinder Roman movement along the route of the killing zone. The result was a mass slaughter of the Romans and the destruction of three legions.

There are many notable examples of ambushes during the Roman-Persian Wars. A year after their victory at Carrhae, the Parthians invaded Syria but were driven back after a Roman ambush near Antigoneia. Roman Emperor Julian was mortally wounded in an ambush near Samarra in 363 during the retreat from his Persian campaign. A Byzantine invasion of Persian Armenia was repelled by a small force at Anglon who performed a meticulous ambush by using the rough terrain as a force multiplier and concealing in houses. Heraclius' discovery of a planned ambush by Shahrbaraz in 622 was a decisive factor in his campaign.

=== Arabia during Muhammad's era ===
According to Muslim tradition, Islamic prophet Muhammad used ambush tactics in his military campaigns. His first such use was during the Caravan raids. In the Kharrar caravan raid, Sa'd ibn Abi Waqqas was ordered to lead a raid against the Quraysh. His group consisted of about twenty Muhajirs. Sa'd, with his soldiers, set up an ambush in the valley of Kharrar on the road to Mecca and waited to raid a Meccan caravan returning from Syria. However, the caravan had already passed and the Muslims returned to Medina without any loot.

Arab tribes during Muhammad's era also used ambush tactics. One example retold in Muslim tradition is said to have taken place during the First Raid on Banu Thalabah. The Banu Thalabah tribe were already aware of the impending attack, so they laid in wait for the Muslims. When Muhammad ibn Maslama arrived at the site, the Banu Thalabah with 100 men ambushed the Muslims while they were making preparation to sleep and, after a brief resistance, killed them all except for Muhammad ibn Maslama, who feigned death. A Muslim who happened to pass that way found him and assisted him to return to Medina.

== Procedure ==
In modern warfare, an ambush can be employed by ground troops up to platoon size against enemy targets, which may be other ground troops, or possibly vehicles. However, in some situations, especially when deep behind enemy lines, the actual attack will be carried out by a platoon. A company-sized unit will be deployed to support the attack group, setting up and maintaining a forward patrol harbour from which the attacking force will deploy, and to which they will retire after the attack. There is no requirement that ground be captured and held.

=== Planning ===
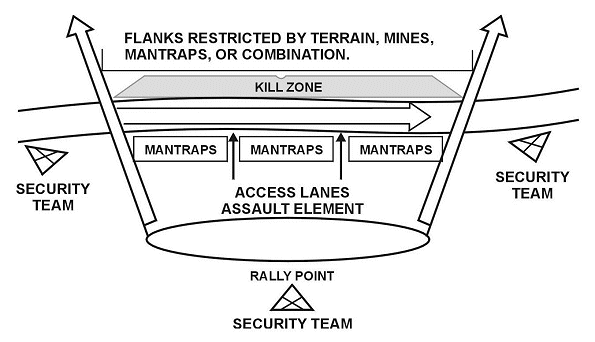
US Army idealised linear ambush plan

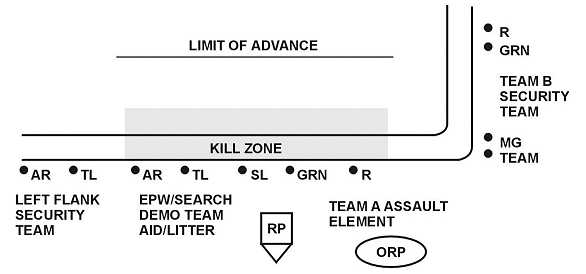
US Army idealised L-shaped ambush plan

Ambushes are complex multiphase operations and are therefore usually planned in some detail. First, a suitable killing zone is identified. This is where the ambush will be laid, where enemy units are expected to pass, and gives reasonable cover for the deployment, execution, and extraction phases of the ambush patrol. A path along a wooded valley floor would be a typical example.

Ambushes can be described geometrically as:

- Linear, when a number of firing units are equally distant from the linear kill zone. It can easily be controlled under all visibility conditions.
- L-shaped, when a short leg of firing units are placed to enfilade (fire the length of) the sides of the linear kill zone.
- V-shaped, when the firing units are distant from the kill zone where the enemy enters and the firing units lay down bands of intersecting and interlocking fire. This ambush is normally triggered only when the enemy is well into the kill zone. The intersecting bands of fire prevent any attempt of moving out of the kill zone.

=== Viet Cong ambush techniques ===
The VC/NVA prepared the battlefield carefully. Siting automatic weapons at treetop level for example helped shoot down several US helicopters during the Battle of Dak To, 1967

The Viet Cong employed ambush techniques frequently during the Vietnam War.

==== Ambush criteria ====
The terrain for the ambush had to meet strict criteria:

- provide concealment to prevent detection from the ground or air
- enable ambush force to deploy, encircle and divide the enemy
- allow for heavy weapons emplacements to provide sustained fire
- enable the ambush force to set up observation posts for early detection of the enemy
- permit the secret movement of troops to the ambush position and the dispersal of troops during withdrawal

One important feature of the ambush was that the target units should 'pile up' after being attacked, thus preventing them any easy means of withdrawal from the kill zone and hindering their use of heavy weapons and supporting fire. Terrain was usually selected which would facilitate this and slow down the enemy. Any terrain around the ambush site which was not favourable to the ambushing force, or which offered some protection to the target, was heavily mined and booby trapped or pre-registered for mortars.

==== Ambush units ====
The NVA/VC ambush formations consisted of:

- lead-blocking element
- main-assault element
- rear-blocking element
- observation posts
- command post

Other elements might also be included if the situation demanded, such as a sniper screen along a nearby avenue of approach to delay enemy reinforcements.

==== Command posts ====
When deploying into an ambush site, the NVA first occupied several observation posts (OPs), placed to detect the enemy as early as possible and to report on the formation it was using, its strength and firepower, as well as to provide early warning to the unit commander. Usually, one main OP and numerous secondary OPs were established. Runners and radios were used to communicate between the OPs and the main command post. The OPs were located so that enemy movement into the ambush could be observed. They would remain in position throughout the ambush to report routes of reinforcement and withdrawal by the enemy, as well as his manoeuvre options. Frequently the OPs were reinforced to squad size and served as flank security. The command post was situated in a central location, frequently on terrain which afforded it a vantage point overlooking the ambush site.

==== Recon methods ====
Reconnaissance elements observing a potential ambush target on the move generally stayed 300–500 meters away. A "leapfrogging" recon technique can be used. Surveillance units were echeloned one behind the other. As the enemy drew close to the first, it fell back behind the last recon team, leaving an advance group in its place. This one in turn fell back as the enemy again closed the gap, and the cycle rotated. This method helped keep the enemy under continuous observation from a variety of vantage points, and allowed the recon groups to cover one another.

== See also ==
- Ambush predator
- Viet Cong and PAVN battle tactics
- Flanking maneuver
- Flypaper theory (strategy)
- List of military tactics
