= Online auction =

Auction held over the internet

An online auction (also electronic auction, e-auction, virtual auction, or eAuction) is an auction held over the internet and accessed by internet connected devices. Similar to in-person auctions, online auctions come in a variety of types, with different bidding and selling rules.

eCommerce sales for businesses have been steadily increasing for years, and with the migration of virtually all transactions to digital due to the COVID-19 pandemic, worldwide sales through ecommerce channels such as websites and online marketplaces increased overall in 2020 and beyond.

There are two primary markets for online auctions: business to business (B2B) and business to consumer (B2C). B2C is forecast to have over a 1% annual growth rate, achieving a nearly 22% share of total global retail sales by 2024. B2B ecommerce gross merchandise value showed a similarly steady rate through 2019, as to mirror its retail B2C counterpart.

The largest consumer-to-consumer online auction site is eBay, which researchers suggest is popular because it is a convenient, efficient, and effective method for buying and selling goods.

Despite the benefits of online auctions, the anonymity of the internet, the large market, and the ease of access make online auction fraud easier than in traditional auctions. The Federal Trade Commission (FTC) categorizes online auction fraud reports with online shopping categories.

== History ==
Online auctions originated on web forums as early as 1979 on CompuServe and The Source, as well as through email and bulletin board systems. Auctioneers and sellers would post notices describing items for sale, minimum bids, and closing times. As the popularity of online auctions grew, websites dedicated to the practice began to appear in 1995 when two auction sites were founded. The first online auction site was Onsale.com, founded by Jerry Kaplan in May 1995. Onsale's business model had the company act as the seller.

In September 1995, eBay was founded by French-Iranian computer scientist Pierre Omidyar using a different approach to online auctions by facilitating person-to-person transactions. This was a popular choice with consumers, leading eBay to become the largest e-commerce site in the early 2000s.

== Benefits of Online Auctions ==
Online auctions offer several advantages, including convenience, access to information, time savings, a wider range of choices, geographical reach, reduced paperwork, and reduced complexity. Buyers can participate in auctions from their homes or offices without having to travel to a physical location. They can also review details about items for sale, including payment terms and conditions, seller feedback ratings, and other items offered by the same seller. This allows buyers to compare products and participate in multiple auctions from a single location, saving time and providing access to a wider selection of items, including similar or related products.

Online auctions also cover large geographical areas, allowing buyers to participate in auctions involving sellers located in other countries. Furthermore, because these auctions are conducted over the internet, they reduce the paperwork involved in the auction process and simplify participation compared with traditional auctions.

Online auction websites also use category-based systems to help buyers navigate large numbers of product listings. On any given day, sellers list millions of items on online auction websites. On large platforms such as eBay, Amazon, Taobao, and Yahoo, buyers need to locate specific products among numerous listings. These websites facilitate product searches through structured categories and subcategories. For example, eBay's main page lists general categories such as antiques, art, clothing, coins, and stamps. Selecting the art category leads to subcategories such as drawings, paintings, and prints. These subcategories may contain additional levels of classification. For example, the paintings subcategory includes categories such as Antique American and Modern European.

== Types ==
=== English auctions ===
English auctions are also known as open outcry or raise prices. In live settings, English auctions are announced by either an auctioneer or by the bidders, and winners pay what they finally bid to receive the object. English auctions are the most common third-party online auction format and are known for their simplicity. The format is popular due to its ease-of-use in an online environment (since computers are capable of tracking and awarding an auction to the highest bidder from many bids).

=== Reverse auction ===
Reverse auctions are used primarily to place multiple sales offers before potential customers. Multiple sellers compete to obtain a buyer's business, and prices typically decrease over time as new offers are made by sellers. They do not follow the typical auction format in that the buyer can see all the offers and may choose which they would prefer. Reverse auctions are used predominantly in a business context for procurement.

=== Bidding fee auction ===
A bidding fee auction (also known as a penny auction) requires customers to pay for bids, which they can increment an auction price one unit of currency at a time. The most notable bidding fee auction was Swoopo.

Critics compare this type of auction to gambling, as users can spend a considerable amount of money without receiving anything in return. The auction owner makes money in two ways: the purchasing of bids, and the actual amount made from the final cost of the item.

== Fraud ==
The increasing popularity of using online auctions has led to an increase in fraudulent activity. Auction websites such as Yahoo and eBay have experienced considerable growth. The Internet Crime Complaint Center has identified online auction fraud as one of the major categories of internet crime, posing risks to auction participants.

Online auction fraud has been classified into several categories. The Internet Fraud Complaint Center (IFCC) identified six categories of online auction fraud: non-delivery of goods, misrepresentation of items, triangulation, fee stacking, selling of black-market goods, and multiple bidding and shill bidding. The latter two forms of fraud can be classified as cheating. A 2009 study classified online auction fraud according to the time at which the fraudulent behaviour occurs, identifying three categories: pre-auction, in-auction, and post-auction fraud. Furthermore, a 2014 study classified online auction fraud according to the behaviour of fraudsters into four types: Aggressive, Classic, Luxury, and Low-profiled. Cheating can be committed by either a bidder (buyer) or an auctioneer (seller).

This is usually performed on an auction website by creating a very attractive auction lot, such as a low starting bid level. Once a buyer wins a lot and pays for it, the fraudulent seller will either not proceed with the delivery, or send a less valuable version of the purchased item (replicated, used, refurbished, etc.). Protection to prevent such acts has become available, for example PayPal's buyer protection policy. As PayPal handles the transaction, it has the ability to hold funds until a complaint is resolved and the victim can be compensated.

Auction fraud makes up a large percentage of complaints received by the FBI’s Internet Crime Complaint Center (around 63% in 2005 and 45% in 2006).

=== Shill bidding ===
Shill bidding is the most prominent type of online auction fraud where sellers themselves submit bids to increase the price of an item they have put up for sale, without intending to win. Shill bidding is also one of the most difficult types of fraud to detect, since it is usually conducted by the seller in collusion with one or more bidders in the auction. In 2011, a bidder on eBay became the first individual to be convicted of shill bidding on an auction. By taking part in the process, an individual is sometimes breaking the law, depending on the relevant jurisdiction, for example breaking the European Union fair trading rules which carries out a fine of up to £5,000 in the United Kingdom.

=== Shield bidding ===
Shield bidding is a technique whereby a buyer uses another account (called a "shield") to discourage other competitors from bidding by artificially increasing the price and then at the last moment withdrawing their bid to allow the actual buyer to win the auction with a lower price. Most online auction sites do not allow withdrawal of bids except in specified circumstances, making this technique impossible to carry out except on sites where such a rule is not implemented.

=== Spotting Shills and Shields ===
It is difficult to spot a dirty technique being used by an anonymous or pseudonymous person in online auctions, but it is certainly doable. It can be revealed by examining a seller's auction history and looking for an account which has bid on every or almost every auction of that seller. If there is someone who meets those characteristics, it is most likely a shill using that account to increase the price.

A shield can be spotted similarly to a shill. By doing a search of a person's won auctions, it can be found out whether or not there is another account participating in the same auctions without ever winning anything. If there is, it is possible that the person is using a shield to help them become successful in auctions.

=== Sale of stolen goods ===
Online auction websites can be used by thieves or fences to sell stolen goods to unsuspecting buyers. According to police statistics, there were over 8000 crimes involving stolen goods, fraud, or deception reported on eBay in 2009. It has become common practice for organized criminals to steal in-demand items, often in bulk, then sell them online. It is thought to be a safer option than fencing stolen items due to the anonymity and worldwide market online auctions provide.

== Interests protection ==
=== Government ===
Governments have identified and taken steps to ensure the safety of online auctions and protect the interests of their citizens, typically by setting up relevant departments to deal with it. In the United States, the Federal Trade Commission (FTC) takes responsibility for protecting consumers from unfair, fraudulent, and deceptive business practices. The FTC provides several resources for guidance on internet auction fraud and actively investigates fraud involving online auctions. According to the Internet Crime Report, online auction fraud ranks among the top complaints received by the Internet Crime Complaint Center (IC3). The Australian Competition & Consumer Commission (ACCC) provides information and advice on online auction fraud through its Scamwatch website. The ACCC actively monitors fraud in the online auction market and takes steps to combat it.

=== Customers ===
Fraud victims have volunteered to set up online communities The original intention of these communities is to comfort people, share their experiences for education and provide reliable intermediary services for certain traders. Some victims have also resorted to controversial methods of retaliation. Their actions include publicly revealing the personal information of identified scammers or disrupting transactions by blindly bidding up prices and then refusing to pay. These methods may inadvertently cause harm to ordinary sellers who are mistakenly identified as fraudsters.

=== Platform ===
Online auction platforms have made significant efforts to prevent fraud and protect their users. Once fraudulent behavior is identified, the platform can freeze the account of the relevant seller. But this can only passively punish accounts of people who have committed fraudulent behavior. Based on the characteristics of the internet, these people only need to register new accounts.

One of the most effective measures is the use of secure payment systems. These platforms force sellers to get payment through trusted payment gateways, thus providing additional security by acting as a middleman between buyers and sellers and increasing the cost to the fraudster of committing a violation. The current mainstream online platforms act more as "intermediaries" and collect deposits from sellers who sell large-value products. With this approach the money is transferred to the seller's account after the ownership of the item is confirmed and transferred, ensuring the security of the transaction.

== See also ==
- Auto auction
- Auction software
- Online travel auction
- Tendering
- Unique bid auction
- Private electronic market
