= Shpoonkle =

Interactive reverse auction

Official website

Shpoonkle.com (no longer operational) was an interactive reverse auction web site that provided a marketplace where lawyers and potential clients could connect. Shpoonkle aimed to help its users find more affordable legal assistance. It also aimed to provide a venue where lawyers could find casework.

== History ==
Shpoonkle was founded by Robert Grant Niznik, a 21-year-old third year student at New York Law School. Recent controversy and lawsuits between law school graduates and their schools support the difficulties many law school graduates are experiencing. Many young lawyers, struggling to repay student loans, could benefit from an online legal marketplace. In several interviews Niznik has referred to the decline in American legal jobs, citing a study by the Northwestern University Law School that found that since 2008 over 15,000 attorney and legal-staff jobs have been eliminated and that according to Forrester Research, about 50,000 American legal jobs will be outsourced overseas by 2015.

== Controversy ==
Even before Shpoonkle was officially launched, it became the subject of controversy within the legal community. Scott Greenfield, a noted New York criminal defense lawyer, wrote about Shpoonkle in his blog, Simple Justice: "Any lawyer who signs up for this service should be immediately disbarred, then tarred and feathered, then publicly humiliated." Susan Cartier Liebel, in her blog Solo Practice University, wrote: "Here you have a race to the bottom as lawyers bid against one another to pay the lowest fee to anonymous clients with legal problems." And lawyer Charles Cooper wrote in his blog, NonTradLaw: "Why the ridiculous name? Is the service provided not demeaning enough to lawyers already without adding to their shame?" A less critical discussion of Shpoonkle in The Wall Street Journal called it an "eBay for lawyers" and the ABA Journal called Shpoonkle "a playfully named Web site that allows attorneys and law firms to bid on legal requests submitted by clients."

== Reception ==
In June 2011, the ABA Journal again wrote about Shpoonkle stating that "Shpoonkle may have a funny-sounding name, but it is no joke." NBC Miami featured a story on Shpoonkle and how it is saving money for consumers with free services.

In July 2011, The Docket of the Denver Bar Association wrote Change isn't always bad, my friends ... even with a name like Shpoonkle."

There is a shift in the legal profession and virtual practices are becoming a reality. As Hank Peters of Bitter Lawyer says: "BigLaw, meet Shpoonkle." Gregory Karp wrote in the Chicago Tribune that "technology is a huge help for consumers to spend money smarter." In August 2011, the Wall Street Journal stated that Shpoonkle uses a competitive bidding model to match customers with attorneys and smaller law firms. The average hourly fees its clients pay are a third of the national average, which hovers around $280 an hour."

== Accolades ==
As a start up, the acceptance and accolades of the consumer, media, and peers is critical for success. Inc.com states "This unusual site helps clients connect with attorneys, and for strapped small businesses it’s a godsend. Essentially, you post a "case" at the site and wait for attorneys to bid. For example, if you need to collect a debt from a customer, you can hire an attorney who will likely charge a percentage fee on the collection. The site streamlines the process: You can send private messages to top lawyers who can contact you, or wait to see who has the best offer for your particular case."

Venturebeat.com wrote of Shpoonkle in October 2011, "We thought his start up idea was brilliant — an eBay just for legal services. People who need legal representation but who don’t have time to call around for rates, or who might not be able to afford a lawyer in other circumstances, can post their needs and get bids. Attorneys then have to compete for a piece of the action."

In December 2011, Shpoonkle was selected by MSNBC Your Business as "Web site of the Week."

== Shpoonkle Canada ==
Shpoonkle launched its services in Canada in the early Fall of 2011. Zoomer Radio AM740 stated "Shpoonkle is an option to deal with the cost of legal advice and legal services, which can be too expensive for most people." The Toronto Star wrote that the "Shpoonkle Canada version is timely. Three weeks ago, the Governor General and the chief justice of the Supreme Court of Canada separately said that legal fees are getting out of hand. Working-class or middle-class people of no great means who have legal needs … feel they cannot take a step of finding a lawyer or launching a lawsuit," Chief Justice Beverley McLachlin told the Canadian Bar Association's annual conference in Halifax."

== Shpoonkle Legal Job Stop ==
In November 2011, Shpoonkle introduced a new feature called the Legal Job Stop. "The new tool called Legal Job Stop is focused on creating an "e-culture" to the legal recruitment and interview process."

From the unique name to the advocacy based services BetaBeat wrote: Besides having the most amazingly made-up name we have seen in a while, Shpoonkle is an interesting addition to the new crop of start-ups focused on creating a peer to peer online marketplace."

The Legal Job Stop a feature launched on Shpoonkle in December 2011, "is also looking to match supply and demand, but with a focus on the growing number of unemployed law school graduates."

== Shpoonkle Debate ==
Joe McKendrick wrote about Shpoonkle "Legal profession, meet the forces of disruption and creative destruction," in his recent article in Smart Planet. The Chronicle of Higher Education's Katherine Mangan also wrote of Shpoonkle and the reaction by users and critics in December 2011 in her article "New Lawyers Hang a Shingle on Shpoonkle, to Some Colleagues' Chagrin." George Leef's article in the National Review Online sums up the situation and the debate over Shpoonkle. Leef notes that new forms of competition such as Shpoonkle are "usually denounced by those already doing well in the approved forms."

== See also ==
- Whocanisue.com
