= Swoopo =

Auction website

- Website type: Bidding fee auction website
- Available in: English, German and Spanish
- Owner: (Germany) Entertainment Shopping AG
- Revenue: €20 million in 2008 (US$28.3 million)
- Employees: 50 (at peak)
- Website: http://www.swoopo.com/
- Commercial: Yes
- Registration: Required
- Launched: September 2005
- Current status: Inactive

Swoopo was a bidding fee auction site where purchased credits were used to make bids. Prior to changing its name to Swoopo in 2008, the website was called Telebid. In March 2011, Swoopo's website became inaccessible, and a notice page claimed that Swoopo was experiencing "technical issues." In February 2012, DealDash obtained the domain name for Swoopo.com. The penny auction was invented by Lloyd Liske and William Buckell when the site was first created and known as telebid.com. At that time the site received bids by phone and charged to transfer their bids to the internet site. This is where the format of paying to place a bid started.

== Mechanics ==
In order to participate in an auction, registered users had to first buy bids (called credits) before entering into an auction. For the US version of the site, credits cost $0.60 apiece and were sold in lots (called BidPacks) of 40, 75, 150, 400, and 1,000. Each credit was good for one bid. Standard auctions began with an opening price of $0.12 and every time someone bids the price increases by $0.12. Other bidding fee auctions use different values - "penny auctions" use $0.01, 6¢ auctions $0.06, etc. The price of bids and the incremental values vary depending on the regional version of the site used. The auction ends when time runs out. However, because each bid extends the length of the auction by 10–20 seconds, the auction could theoretically continue on indefinitely.

Besides making single bids anytime, users could use a so-called "Bidbutler", which was an automatic bidding tool. Users could employ a maximum of 50 Bidbutler bids each time. Once a Bidbutler was active, it would automatically bid in the final 10 seconds of the auction in an attempt to keep the user as the highest bidder. This means if two or more Bidbutlers were active they would repeatedly bid against each other until the one with the most bids left was the "winner".

The money collected by Swoopo consisted of the cost of bids placed plus the final auction amount. As an example, a MacBook Pro with a suggested retail price of $1,799 was sold on Swoopo for $35.86. However, a total of 3,585 bids were placed, so the total amount paid by Swoopo customers was $2,151.

== Controversy ==
The method of selling employed by Swoopo is controversial and has been criticized. The company, responding to claims that Swoopo is a type of gambling, stated that winning auctions involves skill and is not reliant upon chance. Ted Dziuba writing for The Register stated that Swoopo "does not amount to a hustle, it's simply a slick business plan," and that while it might be close to gambling, "the non-determinism comes directly from the actions of other users, not the randomness of a dice roll or a deck of cards." Nevertheless, the argument about "skill game" is put down by MSN Money: "Chris Bauman, director of Swoopo in the US, told one blogger: 'Winning takes two things: money and patience. Every person has a strategy.' Indeed, he undoubtedly does. The problem is that, as with the gambling systems peddled by countless books, none of those strategies will actually work. Just remember that no matter how many times you bid, your chance of winning does not increase". Ian Ayres writing for New York Times blog called Swoopo a "scary website that seems to be exploiting the low-price allure of all-pay auctions". MSN Money has called Swoopo "The crack cocaine of online auction websites", and stated that "in essence, what your 60¢ bidding fee gets you at Swoopo is a ticket to a lottery". The New York Times has called the process "devilish."

Speaking to the BBC, Professor Mark Griffiths of Nottingham Trent University, stated that "penny auction" sites in the UK should be regulated by the Gambling Commission. However the Gambling Commission said that it "was not convinced that penny auctions amounted to gambling".

Speaking to the New York Times, Glen Whitney, a mathematician and a former quantitative analyst at the hedge fund Renaissance Technologies, stated. "In aggregate, consumers trying to obtain these products are overpaying. Unless you have an edge over other people who are bidding, and you can get them to subsidize your purchase, you shouldn't do it. It's a chump's game."

German consumer protection bodies also warn about the auction type offered by Swoopo and other similar auction platforms, likening them to gambling. Techcrunch states that Swoopo is an "'entertainment shopping' site that’s one part auction-house, one part virtual casino"; whereas the alarm:clock calls it a "gambling auction biz". Toptenreviews states: "it warrants considering Swoopo with some different terminology. Rather than "auction" site, maybe we should designate Swoopo as a gambling site—a type of QVC-meets-the-internet-age ponzi scheme".

== Finances ==
Swoopo has received financing from two venture capital firms: an undisclosed amount in December 2006 by Wellington Partners in Munich and $10 million in April 2009 by August Capital in Silicon Valley.

== Closure ==
Swoopo went offline on 17 March 2011, with a message that read

Dear customer,

Due to technical issues, Swoopo is currently not available.
We're working as hard as possible to restore the service.
When the site is working again, we will add ten minutes to the countdown of live auctions, to allow all bidders the chance to get back on-line and start bidding. Please check back regularly.
We're sorry that you're not able to bid at the moment, but we will be back soon.

Your Swoopo team.

On 23 March 2011, Swoopo filed for bankruptcy in Munich Germany.

On 26 March 2011, Swoopo's parent company filed for bankruptcy.

In December 2011, the Swoopo website was inaccessible.

On 8 February 2012, DealDash, the longest running "penny auction" website in the United States acquired the domain Swoopo.com, and the URL currently redirects to DealDash's own website.

== See also ==
- Bidding fee auction
- All-pay auction
- Dollar auction
