= MadBid =

- Type: Private
- Industry: E-commerce, Internet, Online retailing
- Founded: 2008
- Founder: Juha Koski & Daniel Rovira & Madhur Srivastava
- Defunct: 2018
- Fate: Administration
- Headquarters: London, United Kingdom
- Area served: United Kingdom, Ireland, France, Spain, Italy, Germany, Netherlands, India, Austria, Poland, Turkey, Canada, Australia & United States
- Products: Online auction with "Earned Discount" feature
- Revenue: £3 million (2017)
- Website: MadBid.com

MadBid was a gamified eCommerce and online auction website registered under Marcandi Ltd. in the United Kingdom. It was founded in 2008 by Juha Koski, Madhur Srivastava and Daniel Rovira. The company operates in ten European countries including the UK, Ireland, Spain, France, and Australia. However, in August 2018, Madbid closed down and ended all sales.

Skype founders' venture capital firm Atomico in 2010 invested over £4 million ($6 million) in funding for MadBid. Atomico founder Niklas Zennström, best known as a cofounder of Skype, explained the investment by citing his belief at the time that MadBid “allows the most skillful to get amazing bargains” and the company had gained a lot of traction “in a short period of time.”

== Business Model ==
MadBid’s core business model began as a penny auction and the company has since added additional eCommerce features including a "Buy Now" option to purchase products outright, as well as an "Earned Discount" feature that allows consumers to apply the cumulative value of bids placed which did not result in an auction win, towards a discount for products, the discount remains available for 365 days after the auction closed. Most "Buy Now" auctions on MadBid have a price comparison tab so that shoppers can compare against selected online retailers.

=== Bidding ===
The pay-to-bid auction process employed by MadBid is based on users buying "credits" which allow them to place bids in auctions. Users must purchase these credits before participating. Credits are sold in different bulk amounts and cost between 10p and 12.5p. However the effective credit value is significantly lower due to offers and to won credits and credits purchased in "Buy Now". The number of credits to place a bid on each auction varies; smaller auctions require two credits for every bid placed, while larger and more popular auctions can use up to fifteen credits.

Every bid placed raises the auction price of an item by 1p and at the same time extends the closing time of the auction by up to 60 seconds. The auction closes when time runs out, and the last bid wins the right to buy the item for the final auction price plus any processing and shipping costs. The final auction price is incremented by 1p for every bid placed during the auction.

The net result is those who did not win paid for a number of bids and receive nothing (though the amount paid does count towards the "earned discount"), the winning bidder has paid for their bids and will still need to pay the final auction price plus p&p. In one example for a television with an RRP of £450, which cost four credits per bid, the winner spent £217.60 on bids plus the winning price and P&P, all other bidders paid and did not win the item, the highest of those paying £211.60, the other bidders paid much smaller amounts. In total Madbid received £612 for the item. In a more recent example, for a circa £600 laptop, MadBid could have received around £14,000 in bids assuming the cost of bids was equal for all participants.

=== Buy Now ===
MadBid offered a "Buy Now" option, where users can purchase most items without needing to take part in an auction. Additionally credit accrued from bids placed on auctions which weren't won ("Earned Discount"), can be used to reduce the cost of "Buy Now". The true worth of this discount is debated as in instances the base MadBid price is claimed to be significantly more expensive than other online shops. In one example, a toaster listed with RRP of £79.99 was listed for "Buy Now" at £49.38 + delivery, whereas the same toaster was available elsewhere online for £25 with free delivery.

== Awards ==
The Guardian included MadBid as part of their 2010 "Tech Media Invest 100 List". The company was a finalist for the 2011 eCommerce Expo's "Site Innovation Award", and in 2012 they were finalists for the Red Herring 100 Europe Award, in the Entertainment & Media section. Later that year, the company was nominated for the "Small Online Business of the Year Award" at the Orange National Business Awards. The Sunday Times also listed MadBid 41st in the 2012 Tech Track 100 league table.

== History ==
MadBid was founded as a bootstrapped startup by Juha Koski, Madhur Srivastava and Daniel Rovira during 2008. After growth fueled by a 2009 seed round, the partners in 2010 raised £4 million equity financing in a Series A venture round from Skype and Kazaa founders' venture capital fund Atomico; the funding was aimed towards a Europe-wide roll out of services.

Marcandi, the company that operates Madbid, is owned by Jersey-based Keyword Group Ltd. The company has gone into administration as of 28 June 2018.

== Revenue ==
MadBid's sales grew 71% a year, from £1.5 million in 2009 to £7.5 million in 2012, before falling in recent years.

The site had over three million registered users and a million weekly unique user page views in 2012, up from 1.6 million users in 2011. MadBid also saw a 219% click volume increase from its 2010 volume of 60,000–70,000.

The final closing price is usually lower than the product's recommended retail price, but not always cheaper than conventional retail channels. MadBid earns a profit if the revenue from bids placed and the final price are greater than cost price plus operating costs. As MadBid can earn up to around £2.00 for every penny in price increase, an auction that reaches £10 could earn the company close to £100. In 2010, MadBid reported that they profit on only 30% of sales, but that those profits exceed any losses on the remaining 70%, current figures are unreported.

== Criticism ==
Mark D. Griffiths, professor of gambling studies at Nottingham Trent University, has repeatedly called for more regulation of sites like MadBid, but the UK's Gambling Commission has stated that it does not believe that such sites involve gambling, and while the Office of Fair Trading has worked against other sites which utilise automatic bidding against customers, it says it has nothing to add to the work already done.

Due to the possibility of participants losing an auction, some analysts have criticized the model or compared it to gambling, even when operating without fraud. The Better Business Bureau has stated that, "not all penny auction sites are scams" and to "know exactly how the bidding works, set a limit for yourself, and be prepared to walk away before you go over that limit." The Washington state attorney general's office studied the bidding-fee scheme and concluded that it does not constitute gambling under its state laws. It is now studying whether or not such "penny auctions" constitute a lottery.

In May 2015, The Guardian exposed irregularities across three Madbid markets (USA, UK and Europe) where the prices successful bidders were shown to have paid were inaccurate. A Fiat car was shown as having sold for £193, $193 and €193 in its respective markets, an iPad for £34.40, $34.40 or €34.40, and a camera for £23.94 or €23.94. Due to the concept of exchange rates, at least 2 out of the 3 claims were definitely incorrect. Madbid's explanation was that 'Bid winners (from each of the MadBid sites) are automatically displayed across the three sites. However, the software that drives this is not sophisticated enough to deal with the currency conversion and interest rate variables between the pound, dollar and euro. To simplify matters, the price is paid is [sic] consistent across the sites.'

The Guardian also claim that winners of auctions may pay considerably more for their goods than had they purchased them through conventional retail channels, using the example of a toaster with RRP of £79.99 that sold for £36.27 plus £8.99 delivery, but was available for £24.99 delivered from another website. The price paid by the winner excluded the cost of bids.

== See also ==
- Online auction
- E-commerce
- Gamification
