= DealDash =

Bidding fee auction website

- Website type: Private
- Founded: February 22, 2009
- Headquarters: {{{location_country}}}
- Area served: United States
- Founder: William Wolfram
- CEO: Mark Streich
- Industry: E-commerce
- Products: Online bidding-fee auction with "Buy It Now" option
- Employees: 65
- Website: dealdash.com
- Users: 8 million

DealDash is a bidding fee auction website. It was founded in 2009, and is headquartered in Minneapolis, Minnesota, United States.

Users buy "bids", which are credits priced at 13 cents each, which increase the listed price of the item by one cent. If no user places a bid after the previous bid, by a time specified (nine seconds as of 2024), the last user to bid wins the item and must pay the listed price. The user has already used bids, meaning they have used more money in total in the auction for the item than the listed price, potentially more than the manufacturer's suggested retail price (MSRP). Users that lose the auction lose their bids, unless they choose a "buy it now and save your bids" option, with the buy-it-now price being higher than MSRP.

DealDash, as with other bidding fee auction websites, has faced criticism for misleading advertising and marketing, from consumer organizations such as Consumer Reports and Truth in Advertising. The criticisms state that the prices listed on the DealDash site, and in their advertisements, are the vastly lower-than-market price the successful user pays for the item itself, excluding the amount they paid for bids. In certain cases, even in DealDash's own advertisements, the amount a user has paid for bids placed plus the final price is higher than what would have been paid in a regular retailer. The criticisms state that bidding fee auction websites operate as an unregulated form of gambling.

DealDash's own terms of service formerly told users that they are unlikely to win auctions using the service, and are likely to spend more money using the service than the retail cost for any products they might receive. The terms stated that the "entertainment value" of using the service made the higher prices "fair" compared to shopping at the lowest price retailer. However, the terms were updated in 2016 to no longer include those statements.

== History ==
DealDash was founded in 2009 by William Wolfram, a 16-year-old Finnish entrepreneur, who had lost $20 bidding unsuccessfully for a MacBook on an earlier penny auction site. Wolfram had generated approximately $500,000 in affiliate sales a year earlier buying popular YouTube videos for $50, borrowed from his mother, then collecting revenue from affiliate marketing links he would add. He used the money he had saved to start DealDash.

The company's business model, as with prior sites, is that customers enter into bidding, where they pay for each bid on an item, regardless of whether they succeed or not. Each bid marginally increases the price of the item until the end of the auction, at which point the item is sold to the final bidder. DealDash differs from predecessors mainly in that losing bidders are given an option to apply money they had spent unsuccessfully bidding on an item towards purchasing the item at a posted retail price.

DealDash obtained early financing from a youth program of Tekes, a Finnish public funding agency. It later raised approximately $1.5 to $2 million in venture financing from the Chief Executive Officers of Rovio Entertainment (publisher of Angry Birds) and Carbonite. The company grew quickly, quadrupling its revenue yearly for its first three years. As of early 2012 it was earning $1 million profits on $44 million revenue. By 2013 it had 67 employees, yearly revenues approaching $100 million, and was ranked as Finland's second-most visible startup based on attention from media, bloggers, influencers, and users. According to Socialbakers, DealDash was the most talked about brand on Facebook's "People Talking About This" during a period in May 2013, and had the highest engagement rate that September.

In 2013, when Wolfram was still 20 years old, DealDash moved its headquarters from Helsinki, Finland, to Minneapolis, Minnesota. In August of that year, the company also created the site DealDashReviewed.com to house and aggregate reviews and testimonials from their customers. Wolfram departed the company in 2016 at the age of 22, after which he divested his interest and left the board. He has had no role at DealDash since that time.

== Business model ==
DealDash, like other auction sites, has been described as a gamified approach to e-commerce. To participate, registered bidders first buy "bids" priced at $0.13 each, that they may spend bidding on auctions. Standard auctions begin with an opening price of $0.00, with every bid placed increasing the price by $0.01 and removing one paid "bid credit" from the user's balance. Bidders may choose to place single bids, by manually clicking the bid button, or through an automatic bidding tool called the "BidBuddy". An auction clock restarts from a maximum of 9 seconds (as of 2024), every time a bid is placed. If no new bids are placed before the clock runs out, the last and highest bidder is declared the winner of the auction.

== Criticism ==
DealDash has been criticized for offering poor value to customers and for making disclosures only in fine print.

Penny auction sites, including DealDash specifically, have often been criticized for failing to disclose or include the cost of bids in what customers actually spend in total to win a product. In a conventional auction, bids are based on prices that participants are willing to pay, with the item sold to the final bidder within a set period that bids the highest price. This usually allocates the item to the person who is willing to pay the most. By contrast, penny auctions award items to parties that are persistent or lucky enough to place the final bid, with money raised primarily from the cost of bidding rather than the final price of the item. In most cases, users spend substantial sums of money without winning anything. DealDash and others have been compared to gambling by consumer groups.

According to Consumer Reports, the "buy it now" prices can be significantly higher than the same products on Amazon.com. Unsuccessful bidders not using the option lose the value of the bids placed. A company spokesperson says DealDash generates significant business from bidders who choose to buy items after losing, with hundreds of orders processed daily.

Consumer Reports also reported that many "luxury" brands touted on DealDash are non-existent beyond the website and their trademarks are registered by the owner of DealDash, through another company that he is associated with, namely Galton Voysey.

Consumer organization Truth in Advertising reported that a DealDash television commercial shows "Roseanna" winning a $349 KitchenAid stand mixer for "less than $25". Small print explains she bid 761 times on that mixer, which cost her over $456, plus the $25 "price" she won it for. This means she paid closer to $481 – well over the stated $349 retail price. Both Truth in Advertising and Consumer Reports noted that DealDash's own terms of service tell users that they are likely to spend more than the retail cost for products and are unlikely to save money using the site (the terms of service were updated in 2016 to no longer include that statement).

== Lawsuit ==
DealDash faced a false-advertising class-action lawsuit in 2017, with plaintiffs alleging that consumers were deceived into thinking they could purchase items for less than their retail value but in reality having little chance of winning items or saving money. Plaintiffs also argued the allegedly premium products on offer were generic items manufactured by companies with links to Wolfram. Eight months later, the lawsuit was dismissed.

== See also ==
- Online auction
