= QuiBids.com =

American online retailer

QuiBids.com was an American online retailer headquartered in Oklahoma City, Oklahoma, United States. It is a retail website that operates as a bidding fee auction, also known as a penny auction. The company has been sued under allegations that it is a form of illegal gambling and that its advertising is misleading. It advertises the price products are auctioned at in QuiBids cash and compares them to US dollars without disclosing the different currencies being used. It is estimated that their auction website went offline after the beginning of October, 2023.

== History ==
Matt Beckham and Shaun Tilford (now QuiBids's chief executive officer and former chief technology officer, respectively) founded the company in 2009 and launched the site from Beckham's Oklahoma City apartment in the fall of that year. The company name is a portmanteau of the words "quick" and "bids", and is pronounced the way both words sound.

In June 2012, the okcBIZ website named QuiBids the third best small company to work for in Oklahoma.

In November 2013, QuiBids officially re-branded itself as an entertainment retail auction site, selling products such as consumer electronics, home and garden products, apparel and jewelry.

== Lawsuits ==
In 2010 Lawrence Locke filed a class action lawsuit against QuiBids claiming it violated the Oklahoma Consumer Protection Act and common law fraud, alleging that it does not disclose that the majority of customers lose money on the site by bidding on items they did not win. Jeff Geurts, chief financial officer of QuiBids, said the suit has no merit, since QuiBids allows customers who lost an auction to buy the item at the retail price, minus the amount of money spent on bidding.

Other federal lawsuits have also been filed claiming illegal gambling and false advertising by, among other things, misappropriating images from news websites and fabricating customer testimonials. The Washington state attorney general's office studied the bidding-fee scheme and concluded that it does not constitute gambling under its state laws. It is now studying whether or not such "penny auctions" constitute a lottery.
