= William Vickrey =

Canadian-American economist and Nobel Laureate (1914–1996)

- Born: 21 June 1914; Victoria, British Columbia, Canada
- Died: 11 October 1996 (aged 82); Harrison, New York, U.S.

Academic background
- Education: Yale University (BS); Columbia University (MA, PhD)
- Doctoral advisor: Carl Shoup; Robert M. Haig
- Influences: Henry George; Harold Hotelling; John Maynard Keynes

Academic work
- Discipline: Social choice theory and mechanism design
- School or tradition: Georgist
- Institutions: Columbia University
- Doctoral students: David Colander; Jacques Drèze
- Notable ideas: Vickrey auction Revenue equivalence theorem Congestion pricing
- Awards: Nobel Memorial Prize in Economics (1996); Guggenheim Fellowship (1955)
- Website: Information at IDEAS / RePEc

William Spencer Vickrey (/ˈvɪkri/; 21 June 1914 – 11 October 1996) was a Canadian-American economist. He was a lifelong faculty member at Columbia University. A theorist who worked on public economics and mechanism design, Vickrey primarily discussed public policy problems. He originated the Vickrey auction, introduced the concept of congestion pricing in networks, formalized arguments for marginal cost pricing, and contributed to optimal income taxation. James Tobin described him as "an applied economist's theorist, as well as a theorist's applied economist."

Vickrey was awarded the 1996 Nobel Memorial Prize in Economic Sciences with James Mirrlees for their research into the economic theory of incentives under asymmetric information. Vickrey never personally received the Prize; it was announced just three days prior to his death.

== Early years ==
Vickrey was born in Victoria, British Columbia to Charles Vernon Vickrey, a Congregationalist minister, and Ada Eliza Spencer. The family moved to New York City in William's childhood, where his father was General Secretary of the American Committee for Armenian and Syrian Relief, one of the nation's first humanitarian assistance organizations.

Vickrey attended high school at Phillips Academy in Andover, Massachusetts. After obtaining his B.S. in Mathematics at Yale University in 1935, he went on to complete his M.A. at Columbia University in 1937. He stayed at Columbia for a PhD, which he completed 1948 with a 500-page dissertation entitled "An Agenda for Progressive Taxation." Vickrey's doctoral work was interrupted by World War II, when he was enlisted to work for the U.S. National Resources Planning Board and later the Treasury Department's Division of Tax Research.

== Career ==
Vickrey remained at Columbia for his entire career. His students included the economists Jacques Drèze, Harvey J. Levin, and Lynn Turgeon.

=== Contributions ===
Vickrey was the first to use the tools of game theory to explain the dynamics of auctions. In his seminal paper, Vickrey derived several auction equilibria, and provided an early revenue-equivalence result. The revenue equivalence theorem remains the centrepiece of modern auction theory. The Vickrey auction is named after him.

Vickrey worked on congestion pricing, the notion that roads and other services should be priced so that users see the costs that arise from the service being fully used when there is still demand. Congestion pricing gives a signal to users to adjust their behavior or to investors to expand the service in order to remove the constraint. The theory was later partially put into action in London.

In public economics, Vickrey extended the marginal cost pricing approach of Harold Hotelling and showed how public goods should be provided at marginal cost. He contended that efficient funding for public utilities and transportation systems required short-run marginal pricing, or pricing responsive to current demand.

Alongside marginal cost pricing, Vickrey argued that the land value tax was necessary to efficiently fund city services. He wrote that replacing taxes on production and labor ("including property taxes on improvements") with fees for holding valuable land sites "would substantially improve the economic efficiency of the jurisdiction". Vickrey further argued that land value tax had no adverse effects and that replacing existing taxes in this way would increase local productivity enough that land prices would rise instead of fall. He also made an ethical argument for Georgist value capture, noting that owners of valuable locations still take (exclude others from) local public goods, even if they choose not to use them, so without land value tax, land users have to pay twice for those public services (once in tax to government and once in rent to holders of land title).

Vickrey's economic philosophy was influenced by John Maynard Keynes and Henry George. He was sharply critical of the Chicago school of economics and was vocal in opposing the political focus on achieving balanced budgets and fighting inflation, especially in times of high unemployment. Working under General MacArthur, Vickrey helped accomplish radical land reform in Japan.

=== Nobel Prize award and death ===
Vickrey's Nobel Prize in Economics was announced on October 8, 1996. He became the only Nobel laureate born in British Columbia.

Vickrey died three days later while traveling to a conference of Georgist academics that he helped found. His Columbia University economics department colleague C. Lowell Harriss accepted the posthumous prize on his behalf. There are only three other cases where a Nobel Prize has been presented posthumously: Erik Axel Karlfeldt (Literature 1931), Dag Hammarskjöld (Peace 1961) and Ralph Steinman (Physiology or Medicine 2011).

== Personal life ==
Vickrey married Cecile Thompson in 1951. He was a Quaker and a member of Scarsdale Friends Meeting. He died in Harrison, New York in 1996 from heart failure.

== Selected works ==
=== Articles ===
- Vickrey, William (1961). "Counterspeculation, Auctions, and Competitive Sealed Tenders". Journal of Finance. 16 (1): 8–37. doi:10.2307/2977633. JSTOR 2977633. The paper originated auction theory, a subfield of game theory.
- –– (1963). "Pricing in Urban and Suburban Transport". American Economic Review. 53 (2): 452–465. JSTOR 1823886.
- –– (1963). "General and Specific Financing of Urban Service". In Shaller, H.G. (ed.). Public Expenditure Decisions in the Urban Community. pp. 62–90.
- –– (1969). "Congestion Theory and Transport Investment". American Economic Review. 59 (2): 251–260. JSTOR 1823678.
- –– (1977). "The City as a Firm". In Feldstein, Martin; Inman, Robert P. (eds.). The Economics of Public Services. Palgrave Macmillan. pp. 334–343. doi:10.1007/978-1-349-02917-4_13. ISBN 978-1349029198.
- –– (1968). "Automobile Accidents, Tort Law, Externalities, and Insurance, an Economists's Critique". Law and Contemporary Problems. 33 (3): 464–487. doi:10.2307/1190938. JSTOR 1190938.
- Vickrey, William; Solow, Robert (1971). "Land Use in a Long, Narrow City". Journal of Economic Theory. 3 (4): 430–447. doi:10.1016/0022-0531(71)90040-8.

=== Essays ===
- –– (1950). "Ethics and Economics: An Exchange of Questions between Economics and Philosophy". In Ward, A.D. (ed.). Goals of Economic Life. pp. 148–77.
- "Fifteen Fatal Fallacies of Financial Fundamentalism: A Disquisition on Demand Side Economics". October 5, 1996.

=== Textbooks ===
- –– (1964). Microstatics. Harcourt, Brace & World.
- –– (1964). Metastatics and Macroeconomics. Harcourt, Brace & World.

=== Collected works ===
- Arrow, Kenneth Joseph; Arnott, Richard J.; Atkinson, Anthony A.; Drèze, Jacques, eds. (1997). Public Economics: Selected Papers by William Vickrey. Cambridge, UK: Cambridge University Press. ISBN 978-0521597630.

== See also ==
- Electricity market
- London congestion charge
- Road pricing
- Vickrey auction

Awards
| Preceded by Robert E. Lucas Jr. | Laureate of the Nobel Memorial Prize in Economics; 1996; Served alongside: James A. Mirrlees | Succeeded by Robert C. Merton; Myron S. Scholes |
