= Online travel auction =

The term online travel auction is a system of buying and selling travel products and services online by offering them up for auction and then awarding the item to the highest bidder. The need for travel auctions emanated principally due to the high cost of travel. This high cost is also what led to the growth in popularity of low-cost carriers, a concept initially pioneered by Southwest Airlines, and later mimicked by Ryanair.

Online Travel Auctions vary in cost, auction items and purpose. Some are inventory driven by providers like aforementioned airliners, others are marketing websites that auction off flights, hotel weeks, activities or physical retail items from multiple brands. Travel auctions can be commercially driven or supporting a cause. Some originate from a certain feeder area like Vakantieveilingen in Belgium and the Netherlands, others serve to highlight specific destinations.

Online Travel Auctions for causes can be permanent or for one specific event. Some have a hybrid purpose of NGOs supporting their causes and projects via an auction, but highlighting the (donors within a) destination or region in the process.

Rules and timeframes can vary per auction. As with a standard auction, the bidders, having made a judgment on how much a particular voyage is worth to them, place their bid over a set period of time. At the end of this period of time, the highest bidder wins the product at whatever price is finally reached. There are many variations to the way in which Auctions are carried out.

Like a number of other travel websites, travel auction sites pull their stock inventory in from a wide variety of suppliers. The range of products may include cruises, package holidays, hotels, excursions, relevant travel retail items and flights.

== Types of Travel Auctions ==
As well as the most familiar English auction (or open ascending price auction) model, where the participant places a bid higher than the last, a handful of operators run no-reserve auctions or absolute auctions.

Some sites also operate a system of mystery auctions, whereby the bidder is unaware of the product they are bidding on. Another variation on the theme is proxy bidding which involves the bidder stating their maximum bid for a particular product, and the auction site placing the bids for them automatically.

Other sites offer pay to bid or Penny auctions. In these auctions, each bid that the user makes only increases the final price of the flight by 1 cent, while each bidder is charged a small participation fee for each bid that he or she makes. Research from Brown University suggests that such penny or pay per bid auctions have been able to survive thanks to customer retention initiatives such as the Buy-Now functionality which offsets the outright purchase price option of the good by the cost of the bids that the user has incurred, and also by limiting the number of times a particular user can win, leading to a greater pool of winners.
