= Reverse auction =

Auction with one buyer and many potential sellers

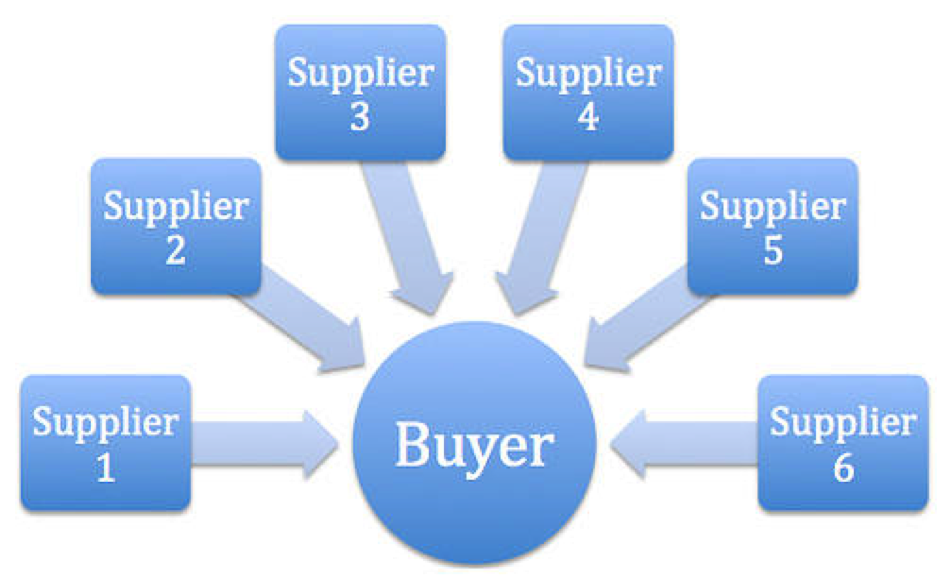

A reverse auction (also known as buyer-determined auction or procurement auction) is a type of auction in which the traditional roles of buyer and seller are reversed. Thus, there is one buyer and many potential sellers. In an ordinary auction also known as a forward auction, buyers compete to obtain goods or services by offering increasingly higher prices. In contrast, in a reverse auction, the sellers compete to obtain business from the buyer and prices will typically decrease as the sellers underbid each other.

A reverse auction is similar to a unique bid auction because the basic principle remains the same; however, a unique bid auction follows the traditional auction format more closely as each bid is kept confidential and one clear winner is defined after the auction finishes.

For business auctions, the term refers to a specific type of auction process (also called e-auction, sourcing event, e-sourcing or eRA, eRFP, e-RFO, e-procurement, B2B Auction). Open procurement processes, which are a form of reverse auction, have been commonly used in government procurement and in the private sector in many countries for many decades.

For consumer auctions, the term is often used to refer to sales processes that share some characteristics with auctions, but are not necessarily auctions in the traditional sense.

== Context ==
One common example of reverse auctions is, in many countries, the procurement process in the public sector. Governments often purchase goods or services through an open procurement process by issuing a public tender. Public procurement arrangements for large projects or service programs are often quite complex, frequently involving dozens of individual procurement activities. Reverse auctions can also be used to reveal private opportunity cost information, which can be useful in the design of incentive programs to correct market failures and promote the provisioning of public goods, common-pool resources, and non-market ecosystem services, for example.

Another common application of reverse auctions is for e-procurement, a purchasing strategy used for strategic sourcing and other supply management activities. E-procurement arrangements enable suppliers to compete online in real time and is changing the way firms and their consortia select and behave with their suppliers worldwide. It can help improve the effectiveness of the sourcing process and facilitate access to new suppliers. This may in the future lead to a standardization of sourcing procedures, reduced order cycle, which can enable businesses to reduce prices and generally provide a higher level of service.

- In a traditional auction, the seller offers an item for sale. Potential buyers are then free to bid on the item until the time period expires. The buyer with the highest offer wins the right to purchase the item for the price determined at the end of the auction.
- A reverse auction is different in that a single buyer offers a contract out for bidding. (In an e-procurement arrangement this is done either by using specialized software or through an on-line marketplace.) Multiple sellers are invited to offer bids on the contract. In public procurement, time limits for the receipt of bids apply.

E-procurement

In the case of e-procurement, When real-time e-bidding is permitted, the price decreases as sellers compete to offer lower bids than their competitors whilst still meeting all of the specifications of the original contract.

Bidding performed in real-time via the Internet results in a dynamic, competitive process. This helps achieve rapid downward price pressure that is not normally attainable using traditional static paper-based bidding processes. Many reverse auction software companies or service providers report an average price reduction of 18–20 percent following the initial auction's completion.

The buyer may award the contract to the seller who bid the lowest price. Or, a buyer may award contracts to suppliers who bid higher prices depending on the buyer's specific needs with regard to quality, lead-time, capacity, or other value-adding capabilities.

The use of optimization software has become popular since 2002 to help buyers determine which supplier is likely to provide the best value in providing goods or services. The software includes relevant buyer and seller business data, including constraints.

Reverse auctions are used to fill both large and small value contracts for both public sector and private commercial organizations. In addition to items traditionally thought of as commodities, reverse auctions are also used to source buyer-designed goods and services; and they have even been used to source reverse auction providers. The first time this occurred was in August 2001, when America West Airlines (which later became US Airways) used FreeMarkets software and awarded the contract to MaterialNet.

One form of reverse auction is static auction (RFQ or tender). Static auction is alternative to dynamic auction and regular negotiation process in commerce especially on B2B electronic marketplace.

In 2003, researchers claimed an average of five percent of total corporate spending was sourced using reverse auctions. They have been found to be more appropriate and suitable in industries and sectors like advertising, auto components, bulk chemicals, consumer durables, computers and peripherals, contract manufacturing, courier services, FMCG, healthcare, hospitality, insurance, leasing, logistics, maritime shipping, MRO, retail, software licensing, textiles, tourism, transport and warehousing.

== History of internet-based reverse auctions ==
The pioneer of online e-procurement reverse auctions in the United States, FreeMarkets, was founded in 1995 by former McKinsey & Company consultant and General Electric executive Glen Meakem after he failed to find internal backing for the idea of a reverse auction division at General Electric. Meakem hired McKinsey colleague Sam Kinney, who developed much of the intellectual property behind FreeMarkets. Headquartered in Pittsburgh, FreeMarkets built teams of "market makers" and "commodity managers" to manage the process of running the online tender process and set up market operations to manage auctions on a global basis.

The company's growth was aided greatly by the hype of the dot-com boom era. FreeMarkets customers included BP, United Technologies, Visteon, Heinz, Phelps Dodge, ExxonMobil, and Royal Dutch Shell, to name a few. Dozens of competing start-up reverse auction service providers and established companies such as General Motors (an early FreeMarkets customer) and SAP, rushed to join the reverse auction marketspace.

Although FreeMarkets survived the winding down of the dot-com boom, by the early-2000s, it was apparent that its business model was really like an old-economy consulting firm with some sophisticated proprietary software. Online reverse auctions started to become mainstream and the prices that FreeMarkets had commanded for its services dropped significantly. This led to a consolidation of the reverse auction service marketplace. In January 2004, Ariba announced its purchase of FreeMarkets for US$493 million.

Fortune published an article in March 2000, describing the early days of internet-based reverse auctions.

In the past few years mobile reverse auction have evolved. Unlike business-to-business (B2B) reverse auctions, mobile reverse auctions are business-to-consumer (B2C) and allow consumers to bid on products for pennies. The lowest unique bid wins.

Very recently business-to-consumer auctions with a twist have started to evolve; they are more similar to the original business-to-business auctions than mobile reverse auctions in that they offer consumers the option of placing a specification before retailers or resellers and allowing them to publicly bid for their business.

In congressional testimony on the 2008 proposed legislative package to use federal funds to buy toxic assets from troubled financial firms, Federal Reserve Chairman Ben Bernanke proposed that a reverse auction could be used to price the assets.

In 2004, the White House Office of Federal Procurement Policy (OFPP) issued a memorandum encouraging increased use of commercially available online procurement tools, including reverse auctions. In 2005, both the Government Accountability Office and Court of Federal Claims upheld the legality of federal agency use of online reverse auctions. In 2008, OFPP issued a government-wide memorandum encouraging agencies to improve and increase competitive procurement and included specific examples of competition best practices, including reverse auctions. In 2010, The White House Office of Management and Budget cited "continued implementation of innovative procurement methods, such as the use of web-based electronic reverse auctions" as one of the contracting reforms helping agencies meet acquisition savings goals.

== Scoring auctions ==
A common form of procurement auction is known as a scoring auction. In that auction form, the score that the buyer gives each bidder depends on well-defined attributes of the offer and the bidder. This scoring function is formulated and announced prior to the start of the auction.

== Buyer determined auctions ==
Many procurement auctions are "buyer determined" in that the buyer reserves the right to select the winner on any basis following the conclusion of the auction. The literature on buyer-determined auctions is often empirical in nature and is concerned with identifying the unannounced implicit scoring function the buyer uses. This is typically done through a discrete choice model, wherein the econometrician uses the observed attributes, including price, and maps them to the probability of being chosen as the winner. This allows the econometrician to identify the weight on each attribute. Conceptually and theoretically, the effect of this format on buyer-supplier relationships is of paramount importance. Instead of each bidder as submitting a price and the lowest price bidder winning the contract, here each bidder can be perceived as submitting a total "score" involving a price + nonprice attributes. The winner is the bidder who has the highest score. Unlike scoring auctions, there is no pre-announced or binding weight on each quality attribute that will determine the winner in a formal fashion. Rather, bidders operate in an uncertain environment in which only the buyer knows its own considerations. Given the uncertainty regarding other bidders’ nonprice qualities, it may be that bidders learn about the competition by observing other bidders’ bids. One can therefore expect systematic differences in their response patterns to competitive bids. Likewise, the provision of information on other bidders in such auctions is generally known to affect prices Pre-existing relationships are known to be the key driver in the buyer’s selection and therefore bidding aggressiveness in the auction-- in terms of the number of bids submitted, the rate at which the bids are submitted, and the price concessions offered—are related to these relationships. Theoretically, the factors that determine under what circumstances a buyer would prefer this format over a price-based format have been explored.

== Demsetz auction ==
A Demsetz auction is a system which awards an exclusive contract to the agent bidding the lowest price named after Harold Demsetz. This is sometimes referred to "competition for the field." It is in contrast to "competition in the field," which calls for two or more agents to be granted the contract and provide the good or service competitively. Martin Ricketts writes that "under competitive conditions, the bid prices should fall until they just enable firms to achieve a normal return on capital." Disadvantages of a Demsetz auction include the fact that the entire risk associated with falling demand is borne by one agent and that the winner of the bid, once locked into the contract, may accumulate non-transferable know-how that can then be used to gain leverage for contract renewal. Demsetz auctions are often used to award contracts for public-private partnerships for highway construction.

== Spectrum auction ==
In the United States, the Federal Communications Commission created FCC auction 1001 as a reverse auction in order to get back much of the 600MHz band from television broadcasting. The remaining TV stations would then be repacked onto the lower UHF and even VHF TV channels. After the reverse auction in June 2016, a forward spectrum auction (FCC auction 1002) will then be held, with mostly mobile phone carriers as the buyers.

== Dutch reverse auctions ==
While a traditional Dutch Auction starts at a high bid which will then decrease, a Reverse Dutch Auction works the opposite way as it starts at a low price and then gradually increases over time. It contains a list of items that buyers want to procure and the price rises after fixed intervals until a reserved price is reached. Before the reserved price is reached, if a supplier places a bid for the item, it is allocated to the supplier and the item closes for bidding.

In this auction, the buyer specifies a starting price, price change value, time interval between price changes, and the reserved price.

The auction opens with the first item with a specified start price and increases by the price change value (amount or percentage) after a fixed interval. The start price keeps on increasing until any supplier places a bid or the start price reaches the reserved price. After the bidding is closed for the item it moves to another item sequentially.

Auction is closed when the bidding for all items is completed.

== Japanese reverse auctions ==
Although the history of the Japanese reverse auction is unknown, they are widely used in the world of business-to-business procurement as a form of cost negotiation.

A Japanese auction is where the host of the auction states an opening price and participants have to accept that price level or withdraw from the auction. Acceptance indicates that the participant is prepared to supply at the stated price. When all participants reply to a certain price, the software lowers the price level by a predetermined amount and again asks participants to accept or decline at the new price level.

This kind of auction continues until there are no more participants bidding.

== Comparison of Japanese and Dutch reverse auctions ==
The major difference between Japanese and Dutch reverse auctions is in putting suppliers in two different position. While in Dutch reverse auctions suppliers opt-in at intended price point and thus end the auction immediately, in reverse Japanese auctions suppliers explicitly opt-out of a given market at their intended price point.

The benefits of the Japanese reverse auction are based on the fact that the buying organization has greater transparency to the actual market itself. In this regard, the format more closely mirrors that of a traditional reverse auction by providing greater visibility to each participant's lowest offer.

But in contrast to a Dutch auction format, Japanese auctions do not put what one Dutch auction users describes as "maximum psychological pressure" on the supply base and especially on the incumbent suppliers. This can put the buyer in a better position regarding with potentially earning more than he should based on the market.

== Strategy in reverse auctions ==
The suppliers should firstly determine the lowest price for which they are willing to sell their products. To do this effectively they must be able to compute their true marginal cost and identify extra-auctions costs and benefits. However, that does not mean that the best strategy is to bid the lowest price. In the analysis of extra-auction costs and benefits, they should examine areas where winning or losing can generate unexpected benefits or avoided costs. Some examples include:

- Winning or losing changes their volume discount, rebates and incentives with key suppliers,
- Losing requires laying off personnel with its associated termination costs,
- Winning opens a new account more inexpensively than hiring a sales representative.

Based on this analysis, the supplier should choose his goals for the auction. The obvious goal is to win the auction at a profitable price. However, that is not always the best goal. Because of the examples of reasons mentioned above the supplier might choose as a goal for example:

- To come in second (or third) while keeping the price high,
- To come in second while driving the price down to unprofitable levels for the winner,
- To bid down to a certain price and stop, regardless of winning position and potential profitability.

After this preparation, the supplier should try to achieve his goal within the specific auction protocols and characteristics of the auction interface. The important characteristics that differ between auctions are the ability to see the current low bid and the knowing of their current relative position.

== See also ==
- Tendering
- Request for Quotation
- Request For Tender
- Request For Information
- Request For Proposal
- Optimization (mathematics)
- Operations research
- Shpoonkle
