= Unique bid auction =

Auction in which bidders are not allowed to place bids of equal amounts

A unique bid auction is a type of strategy game related to traditional auctions where the winner is usually the individual with the lowest unique bid, although less commonly the auction rules may specify that the highest unique bid is the winner. Unique bid auctions are often used as a form of competition and strategy game where bidders pay a fee to make a bid, or may have to pay a subscription fee in order to be able to participate.

In practice, such auctions function like lotteries, but the small amount of "skill" involved makes them legal in jurisdictions where lotteries are otherwise illegal.

== Mechanism ==
This type of auction requires bidders to place bids that are global unique bids. That is, for a bid to be eligible to win no other bidder can have made a bid for the same amount. Bidders are generally able to place multiple bids and the number of current bids at each amount is typically kept secret.

There are two major variants of unique bid auctions:

- In a highest unique bid auction, the bid that is the highest and unmatched when the auction closes is the winning bid. A maximum bid value is usually set at a much lower level than the actual value of the lot.
- In a lowest unique bid auction, the bid that is the lowest and unmatched when the auction closes is the winning bid.

Unique bid auctions will typically allow bids to be very precise, in that each bid can be specific to the 'penny'.

For example, a unique bid auction might run as follows:

Value	Number of bids	Comment
$0.01	34	
$0.02	9	
$0.03	17	
$0.04	57	
$0.05	35	
$0.06	1	Lowest unique bid
$0.07	17	
$0.08	0	
$0.09	1	Highest unique bid
$0.10	100	

In a lowest unique bid auction, the bidder who submitted the single bid of $0.06 would win the auction, and would be eligible to purchase the product or service for $0.06, because their bid was the lowest unique bid. In a highest unique bid auction, the bidder who submitted a bid of $0.09 would win the auction.

In this type of auction the bids of other participants are necessarily secret, although some companies may provide broad guidance following a bid, such as whether the winning unique bid is higher or lower than one's last bid. In some instances the players may receive enough information for the game to be considered one of strategy. In other cases the guidance provided may be of little or no strategic value and the game may be considered one of chance.

== Profitability of unique bid auctions ==
Although items worth thousands of dollars can, under some circumstances, be won by very low bids of far less than their value, the auction organizer typically charges a participation fee, which in an auction with a sufficiently large number of bidders will exceed the value of the item being sold, allowing the auction organizer to make a profit.

Because such auctions typically require very large numbers of bidders to be profitable, virtually all instances of unique bid auctions are heavily dependent on the use of technology, in that they are either run solely using mobile technology (e.g. bidders submit their bids via reverse charge text messages) or they are on-line auction sites, or both.

== Legality ==
The legality of unique bid auctions depends on a combination of governing gambling laws and the design of the specific auction model. If an investigating authority were to determine that randomness or chance plays too large a role in the outcome, the auction may be considered a type of lottery. If, on the other hand, the investigating authority found strategy and skill played a sufficient role in the outcome, they may find the auction to be legal. Worldwide, there are no reported cases or statutes specifically outlawing the lowest-unique bid auction model.

The definition of a lottery differs among jurisdictions and is to be judged in a case by case manner. An English case held that "there will seemingly be never any finality on the question what is a lottery" because "attempts to do so may indeed be counter-productive, since each added precision merely provides an incentive to devise a variant which eludes it". Legislatures tend to leave the definition open in order to encompass lotteries that were not envisaged at the time of the enactment of the legislation.

Under English common law, a lottery includes any game, method, device, scheme or competition whereby money or money's worth is distributed or allotted in any manner depending upon or to be determined by chance or lot, whether the same is held, drawn, exercised or managed within or without the jurisdiction. A business model is therefore a lottery if participants are required to:-

- pay a non-refundable fee of money or money in kind, in
- a scheme of lot or chance, to
- receive a reward of some kind,

Depending on a combination of governing gambling laws and the design of the specific auction, unique bid auctions may satisfy the above criteria.

=== Paying a non-refundable fee ===
Unique bid auction companies typically avoid calling the payment by the bidder an outright fee for the chance of winning an item, applying synonyms to elude the purpose of raising revenue from a collective pool of bidders that covers the cost of the auction item.

Some businesses, rather than refunding the fee paid, provide something else in kind to distance themselves from being a lottery. In the New Zealand case Department of Internal Affairs v Hayes [2007], customers offered bids costing 99 cents for the chance to win a Peugeot car. The company offered Pizza Hut discount coupons to the bidders. Although customers received an item of value, the bids were sent for the purpose of winning a car, and the refund was not identical to what had been offered, the auction was held to be a lottery.

Other auction models offer rewards points, discounts and other bonuses.

If no fee of any kind is required to bid, as with traditional auction models like eBay, the scheme is not a lottery because participants are not losing money (or anything else).

=== Chance ===
Chance means that the result be uncertain, indefinite or doubtful.

Although the role of chance makes a scheme a lottery, unique bid auctions may avoid lottery classification if chance plays only an incidental role when skill is the overriding factor. The legal question becomes whether "chance predominates and is the one outstanding feature". "The exercise of any skill, greater than a mere scintilla, which, looking at the scheme as a whole, has contributed to the successful result, will be sufficient to take the case out of the (English) Act." An example where a scheme was permitted to run despite the role of chance was when the individual "used his knowledge and experience of the football world in choosing the pools to be entered into and the method of completing them". Sports wagering is legal in only a few US locales that typically also allow other forms of gambling—Las Vegas for instance. Gambling laws, which are predominantly written at the State level, continue to evolve in the US. The degree to which 'chance', 'randomness' or 'luck' factors into the determination of legality varies significantly between the states and around the world.

A distinguishing difference between unique bid auctions and traditional lotteries, games of chance, and sporting events (gambling) is the absence of an external randomizing device. All cards games, lotteries, raffles and mechanical games typically found in casinos utilize an exogenous device to introduce chance into the game. In card games it is the deck of cards. Lotteries use randomly selected numbers while raffles rely on randomly selected tickets or markers to select the winner. Table games in casinos use dice. In sporting events, the participants in the competition (football players for instance) represent the element of chance since their behavior is outside the control of those wagering on the outcome. In a unique bid auction, there is no external device that introduces chance or randomness. The outcome of the auction, while not controlled exclusively by one player, is controlled exclusively by the collective group of players wagering on the outcome. And only those participating in the game can wager on the outcome.

=== Receiving a reward of some kind ===
The unique bid auction model's attractiveness is the possibility of obtaining an item at significantly lower cost than the retail price.

== Mathematical analysis ==
The theory of unique bid auctions has been the subject of mathematical investigation. In a 2007 paper Bruss, Louchard and Ward proposed a technique for calculating game-theoretic probabilistic optimal strategies for unique bid auctions, given a small set of extra assumptions about the nature of the auction. Another paper by Raviv and Virag in the same year made theoretical predictions and compared their results to the results of real-world unique bid auctions. Another paper by Rapoport et al. compared theoretical results to the results of experimental auctions.

Further work by Bruss et al. and a number of other researchers including Gallice, and Rapoport and Otsubo has continued to develop the theory on this subject.

In a 2012 study Pigolotti et al. conducted a thorough study of the unique bid auction in the grand canonical ensemble, finding a theoretical expression for the Nash equilibrium distribution and showing that real-world players play according to this distribution when the number of players in the auction is low.

Nash equilibrium distribution for the Lowest Unique Positive Integer (LUPI) game with N=100 players

Closely related is the Lowest Unique Positive Integer (LUPI) game, studied by Östling et al (2011). This simplification removes the requirement that the winner pays the successful bid value, so the game is simply to select the lowest unique positive integer, with the value of that integer having no further consequence. In practice, because the value of the bid in the auction game is usually negligible compared to the prize, in those circumstances the strategy for a full auction is essentially identical to that of the simpler LUPI game. A daily LUPI game called "Limbo" was offered by the Swedish state gaming company Svenska Spel between January and March 2007, attracting on average about 50,000 players.

Östling et al give a method for calculating the Nash equilibrium distribution for the game, shown on the right for the case of N=100 independent entries. This is also the probability of that integer winning the game, if all the players are following the distribution to pick their integer. A striking feature is the existence of a maximum integer, above which the strategy recommends a weighting of zero. In the case here $p(n)=0$ for $n>31$. Above this number, the chance that the game has not been won by a lower integer falls below $1/(N+1)$. Therefore, even if one knew with certainty that a given high number would be a unique guess, the chance of that number winning would still be less than one could achieve with a lower number.

Below this threshold the Nash distribution is constructed to give each player the same chance of winning, regardless of which number they choose. This chance is a combination of two factors: first, there must be no other player who has chosen the same number; and second, there must be no lower number that has already won the game. Together these lead to the distinctive shape of the curve. At lower numbers, the chance of an even lower number having already won the game is smaller; but this is compensated by players being more likely to choose the number, and so it is less likely to be unique. These factors exactly cancel each other out, giving each player the same chance of winning whichever number they choose; but more such players are likely to choose the lower number, so these numbers are more likely to win, following the shape of the curve shown.

The size of the two factors can be estimated as follows, for reasonably large values of $N$:

If all players play according to the Nash distribution, the number of times a particular integer $n$ is picked should follow a Poisson distribution, with a probability $e^{- (N-1) p(n)}$ that no other player will have picked the number.

The chance of a lower number having already won the game is $\sum_1^{n-1} p(i)$,

Combining these leads to the equation:

$$\left( e^{- (N-1) p(n)} \right) \left(1 - \sum_1^{n-1} p(i) \right) = r$$

where $r$ is the chance each player has of winning.

Using the estimate $r = 1/(N+1)$ then gives the formula

$$p(n) = \frac{1}{N-1} \left( \ln (N+1) + \ln (1 - \sum_1^{n-1} p(i) ) \right)$$

The cut-off value will thus be a little above $N / \ln(N)$.

=== Deviations from the Nash distribution ===
Considering data from the Swedish "Limbo" game, Östling et al found that players had rapidly adapted to avoid high numbers, above the Nash cut-off, when these did not win. Similarly a marked initial excess of very low numbers also disappeared, as players became more aware of the pattern of typical winning numbers. However, the range of numbers backed by most players did not extend quite as high as the Nash equilibrium would predict. This appears to be a self-perpetuating feature, since if players do not back the numbers at the higher end of the Nash range, such numbers are less likely to win, and therefore players will continue to be disinclined to back them. Östling et al found that a model based on a mixture of iterative solutions of increasing depth was able to reproduce the observed distribution quite well.

Looking at auction data, Pigolotti et al found behaviour in auctions with smaller numbers of players ($N \approx 200$) to be in "striking" agreement with the predicted Nash distribution, in particular accurately matching the position of the sharp cut-off. Östling et al found similarly in a LUPI game recreated for the study with an average of 27 players. However, agreement deteriorated as the size of the auction increased, until in auctions with $N > 2000$ the observed pattern of bids was better matched by an exponential distribution. Pigolotti et al suggest that the larger auctions had attracted more players with less knowledge of the pattern of typical winning bids; and that some players may have had a reluctance against making higher bids. As a result, other players bidding in the middle of the Nash range sometimes had a probability of success over 10 times the level they would have had, had all players adopted the Nash strategy.

In both cases the researchers found typical psychological patterns in the finer structure of the numbers chosen. In the Swedish "Limbo" game, a number of players appeared to have disproportionately chosen particular favourite numbers, such as their year of birth. On the other hand, players apparently sought to avoid particular "focal" numbers, such as even numbers or round numbers divisible by 10, in favour of odd numbers or prime numbers -- although Östling et al found that after 49 rounds of their smaller game, the tendency to disproportionately choose odd numbers became almost eradicated.

=== Similar games ===
A similar game is Guess 2/3 of the average, where the optimal strategy depends on the actions of the other players.

== See also ==
- Bidding fee auction, another auction scheme in which bidders pay for entry
- Online auction
