= Bitter Lawyer =

- Website type: Blog
- Website: http://www.bitterlawyer.com/
- Commercial: Yes
- Current status: Inactive

BitterLawyer.com was a legal humor and news blog targeted at disgruntled lawyers. The site featured a webshow titled Living the Dream, created by Rick Eid, which follows the bumblings of fictional big law junior associate Nick Conley (played by John T. Woods). Accompanying blog posts describe the real-life inspirations behind each webisode. There were also many columns: an advice column authored by "an Ex-Bitter"; "Associate Abuse," which posted associate war stories from all over; "Bitter by Numbers," an opinion column appearing in list form; "Loose Ends," which covered legal news; "Bitter Rant," which posted lawyer rants from all over; "Pictures Framed," which posted images or illustrations of lawyers and invited readers to submit captions; and "Temper(a)mental," written from the point of view of a legal temp.

== Contributors ==
Rick Eid, an executive producer of the NBC series Chicago P.D. created the site in 2008. He has also been a producer and writer for the television shows The Ex List, Law & Order, Law & Order: Trial by Jury, Conviction, and The Guardian. He is also a former Skadden, Arps, Slate, Meagher & Flom associate and Manatt, Phelps & Phillips partner.

Former contributors include:

- "Ex-Bitter," a former BigLaw partner.
- Gregory D. Luce, creator of the satirical website Big Legal Brain and former editor of Bitter Lawyer.
- "Law Firm 10," formerly a BigLaw associate in Chicago.
- "Matthew Richardson," a now-unemployed mergers and acquisitions BigLaw associate in New York.
- Michael Estrin, a former lawyer and full-time writer.
- Philadelphia Lawyer
- BL1Y

== Recognition ==
Bitter Lawyer was ranked in the ABA Journal Blawg 100 in the "Lighter Fare" category, calling the blog "a category killer for legal humor websites."

In 2010 Bitter Lawyer won a Webby for best legal website.

== Notable Interviews ==
Bitter Lawyer regularly interviewed celebrities with a connection to the legal community, typically people were formerly lawyers but have since made a name for themselves in another profession. Past interviews have included:

- The New York Times Puzzle Editor Will Shortz,
- Eugene Volokh of "The Volokh Conspiracy,"
- humorist and author Tucker Max,
- author Elizabeth Wurtzel,
- Jeff Marx, composer for Avenue Q,
- cartoonist Stephan Pastis,
- author Jeffrey Toobin,
- Texas Tech football coach Mike Leach,
- Joe Escalante, owner of Kung Fu Records.

== Ownership ==
In April 2011, Bitter Lawyer was acquired by the owners of Lawyerist.com.

In May 2014, Lawyerist sold Bitter Lawyer to Bitter Empire, LLC, a company owned by Lisa Needham and Joline Zepcevski.
