= All-pay auction =

Auction in which every bidder pays

In economics and game theory, an all-pay auction is an auction in which every bidder must pay regardless of whether they win the prize, which is awarded to the highest bidder as in a conventional auction. As shown by Riley and Samuelson (1981), equilibrium bidding in an all pay auction with private information is revenue equivalent to bidding in a sealed high bid or open ascending price auction.

In the simplest version, there is complete information. The Nash equilibrium is such that each bidder plays a mixed strategy and expected pay-offs are zero. The seller's expected revenue is equal to the value of the prize. However, some economic experiments and studies have shown that over-bidding is common. That is, the seller's revenue frequently exceeds that of the value of the prize, in hopes of securing the winning bid. In repeated games even bidders that win the prize frequently will most likely take a loss in the long run.

The all-pay auction with complete information does not have a Nash equilibrium in pure strategies, but does have a Nash equilibrium in mixed-strategies.

== Forms of all-pay auctions ==
The most straightforward form of an all-pay auction is a Tullock auction, sometimes called a Tullock lottery after Gordon Tullock, in which everyone submits a bid but both the losers and the winners pay their submitted bids. This is instrumental in describing certain ideas in public choice economics.

The dollar auction is a two player Tullock auction, or a multiplayer game in which only the two highest bidders pay their bids. Another practical examples are the bidding fee auction and the penny raffle (pejoratively known as a "Chinese auction").

Other forms of all-pay auctions exist, such as a war of attrition (also known as biological auctions), in which the highest bidder wins, but all (or more typically, both) bidders pay only the lower bid. The war of attrition is used by biologists to model conventional contests, or agonistic interactions resolved without recourse to physical aggression.

== Rules ==
The following analysis follows a few basic rules.

- Each bidder submits a bid, which only depends on their valuation.
- Bidders do not know the valuations of other bidders.
- The analysis is based on an independent private value (IPV) environment where the valuation of each bidder is drawn independently from a uniform distribution [0,1]. In the IPV environment, if my value is 0.6 then the probability that some other bidder has a lower value is also 0.6. Accordingly, the probability that two other bidders have lower value is $0.6^2=0.36$.

== Symmetry Assumption ==
In IPV bidders are symmetric because valuations are from the same distribution. These make the analysis focus on symmetric and monotonic bidding strategies. This implies that two bidders with the same valuation will submit the same bid. As a result, under symmetry, the bidder with the highest value will always win.

== Using revenue equivalence to predict bidding function ==
Consider the two-player version of the all-pay auction and $v_i, v_j$ be the private valuations independent and identically distributed on a uniform distribution from [0,1]. We wish to find a monotone increasing bidding function, $b(v)$, that forms a symmetric Nash Equilibrium.

If player $i$ bids $b(x)$, he wins the auction only if his bid is larger than player $j$'s bid $b(v_j)$. The probability for this to happen is

$\mathbb{P}[b(x) > b(v_j)] = \mathbb{P}[x > v_j] = x$, since $b$ is monotone and $v_j \sim \mathrm{Unif}[0,1]$

Thus, the probability of allocation of good to $i$ is $x$. Thus, $i$'s expected utility when he bids as if his private value is $x$ is given by

$u_i(x|v_i)=v_ix-b(x)$.

For $b$ to be a Bayesian-Nash Equilibrium, $u_i(x_i|v_i)$ should have its maximum at $x_i = v_i$ so that $i$ has no incentive to deviate given $j$ sticks with his bid of $b(v_j)$.

$\implies u_i'(v_i) = 0 \implies v_i = b'(v_i)$

Upon integrating, we get $b(v_i) = \frac{v_i^2}{2} + c$.

We know that if player $i$ has private valuation $v_i = 0$, then they will bid 0; $b(0) = 0$. We can use this to show that the constant of integration is also 0.

Thus, we get $b(v_i) = \frac{v_i^2}{2}$.

Since this function is indeed monotone increasing, this bidding strategy $b$ constitutes a Bayesian-Nash Equilibrium. The revenue from the all-pay auction in this example is

$R=b(v_1)+b(v_2)=\frac{v_1^2}{2}+\frac{v_2^2}{2}$

Since $v_1, v_2$ are drawn iid from Unif[0,1], the expected revenue is

$\mathbb{E}[R]=\mathbb{E}[\frac{v_1^2}{2}+\frac{v_2^2}{2}]=\mathbb{E}[v^2]=\int\limits_{0}^{1} v^2dv =\frac{1}{3}$.

Due to the revenue equivalence theorem, all auctions with 2 players will have an expected revenue of $\frac{1}{3}$ when the private valuations are iid from Unif[0,1].

== Bidding Function in the Generic Symmetric Case ==
Suppose the auction has $n$ risk-neutral bidders. Each bidder has a private value $v_i$ drawn i.i.d. from a common smooth distribution $F$. Given free disposal, each bidder's value is bounded below by zero. Without loss of generality, then, normalize the lowest possible value to zero.

Because the game is symmetric, the optimal bidding function must be the same for all players. Call this optimal bidding function $\beta$. Because each player's payoff is defined as their expected gain minus their bid, we can recursively define the optimal bid function as follows:

$\beta(v_i) \in arg\max_{b \in \mathbb{R}} \left\{\mathbb{P}(\forall j \neq i: \beta(v_j) \leq b)v_i - b\right\}$

Note because F is smooth the probability of a tie is zero. This means the probability of winning the auction will be equal to the CDF raised to the number of players minus 1: i.e., $\mathbb{P}(\forall j \neq i: \beta(v_j) \leq \beta(v_i)) = F(v_i)^{n - 1}$.

The objective now satisfies the requirements for the envelope theorem. Thus, we can write:
$$\begin{align}
\int_0^{v_i} F(\tau)^{n - 1}d\tau &= (F(v_i)^{n - 1} \cdot v_i - \beta(v_i)) - (F^{n - 1}(0) \cdot 0 - \beta(0)) \\
\beta(v_i) &= F^{n - 1}(v_i)v_i - \int_0^{v_i} F(\tau)^{n - 1}d\tau \\
\beta(v_i) &= \int_0^{v_i} \tau dF^{n - 1}(\tau)
\end{align}$$

This yields the unique symmetric Nash Equilibrium bidding function $\beta(v_i)$.

== Examples ==
Consider a corrupt official who is dealing with campaign donors: Each wants him to do a favor that is worth somewhere between $0 and $1000 to them (uniformly distributed). Their actual valuations are $250, $500 and $750. They can only observe their own valuations. They each treat the official to an expensive present - if they spend X Dollars on the present then this is worth X dollars to the official. The official can only do one favor and will do the favor to the donor who is giving him the most expensive present.

This is a typical model for all-pay auction. To calculate the optimal bid for each donor, we need to normalize the valuations {250, 500, 750} to {0.25, 0.5, 0.75} so that IPV may apply.

According to the formula for optimal bid:

$b_i(v_i)=\left(\frac{n-1}{n}\right){v_i}^{n}$

The optimal bids for three donors under IPV are:

$b_1(v_1)=\left(\frac{n-1}{n}\right){v_1}^{n}=\left(\frac{2}{3}\right){0.25}^{3} = 0.0104$

$b_2(v_2)=\left(\frac{n-1}{n}\right){v_2}^{n}=\left(\frac{2}{3}\right){0.50}^{3} = 0.0833$

$b_3(v_3)=\left(\frac{n-1}{n}\right){v_3}^{n}=\left(\frac{2}{3}\right){0.75}^{3} = 0.2813$

To get the real optimal amount that each of the three donors should give, simply multiplied the IPV values by 1000:

$b_1real(v_1=0.25)= $10.4$

$b_2real(v_2=0.50)= $83.3$

$b_3real(v_3=0.75)= $281.3$

This example implies that the official will finally get $375 but only the third donor, who donated $281.3 will win the official's favor. Note that the other two donors know their valuations are not high enough (low chance of winning), so they do not donate much, thus balancing the possible huge winning profit and the low chance of winning.

A real life example of an all-pay auction can be found as part of the format of the Polish game show Awantura o kasę.
