= Whocanisue.com =

whocanisue.com was a legal website operated by WCIS Media, LLC, that offered information to internet users that may believe they have a legal claim against another person or business. The company's mission was to provide legal information to internet users, assist users in determining if they have a lawsuit, and suggest users attorneys within their area.

whocanisue.com was branded into a Spanish website called Meto Un Su . The website was featured in the news.

WCIS Media, LLC, was administratively dissolved by the State of Florida in 2016.
