= Attrition warfare =

Military strategy of wearing down the enemy

Attrition warfare is a form of military strategy in which one side attempts to gradually wear down its opponent to the point of collapse by inflicting continuous losses in personnel, materiel, and morale. The term attrition is derived from the Latin word atterere, meaning "to wear down" or "to rub against", reflecting the grinding nature of the strategy.

== Strategic considerations ==
Attrition warfare seeks to erode an opponent's capacity to wage war by systematically destroying their military resources, morale, and logistics over time. This may involve guerrilla warfare, people's war, scorched earth tactics, or prolonged engagements short of a decisive battle. It contrasts with strategies such as blitzkrieg or force concentration, which aim to achieve rapid victory through overwhelming power in a single decisive engagement. As Clausewitz described, it is a strategy of exhausting the adversary's will and capability to fight.

A combatant facing a significant disadvantage may deliberately adopt an attritional approach to offset the enemy's superior firepower, mobility, or resources. Sun Tzu warned that “no nation has ever benefited from prolonged warfare,” yet historical cases such as Russia's successful attritional campaign against Napoleon in 1812 demonstrate how deliberate resource depletion can lead to strategic victory under the right conditions.

Attritional methods are sometimes employed to degrade the enemy to the point where alternative strategies—such as maneuver warfare or concentrated offensives—become viable. At this stage, attrition may be abandoned or supplemented. In World War I, however, commanders on both sides relied excessively and ineffectively on attritional tactics, resulting in enormous casualties with minimal strategic gains.

The boundaries between attrition and other forms of warfare are often blurred, as most battles involve elements of attrition. Nonetheless, a formal attrition strategy is distinct in its focus on inflicting sustained, cumulative losses—through encirclement, prolonged operations, or disruption of supply and morale—rather than seeking a swift, decisive victory.

While attrition warfare may seem favorable for nations with greater resources or asymmetric strategic depth, it carries significant risks. Chief among them is the time required to achieve results. Prolonged conflicts can lead to changing geopolitical conditions, shifts in public support, or opportunities for the adversary to adapt tactically and strategically.

Some campaigns are mistakenly characterized as textbook cases of attrition when they may be better understood as reactive or improvised strategies. For example, during the Battle of Britain, Germany's shift from targeting RAF infrastructure to bombing British cities (the Blitz) adopted elements of attritional thinking—particularly in targeting morale. However, this shift was not part of a deliberate, long-term attritional strategy. Rather, it was a reactive decision born from the Luftwaffe's failure to destroy British air power and the expectation of quick political collapse. Germany lacked the industrial depth and logistical endurance typically required for a true attrition campaign, and the strategy ultimately failed to achieve its objectives.

While attrition warfare can succeed under certain conditions, it can also lead to strategic overextension or collapse if misapplied—such as in the case of Athens during the Peloponnesian War or Germany's air campaign in 1940.

== Examples in history ==
=== Most typical ===
Animated map of the Russian campaign

The French invasion of Russia in 1812 is often cited as a textbook example of attrition warfare. The Russian army avoided direct, decisive engagements and instead disrupted Napoleon's military logistics, drew his forces deeper into hostile territory, and used the environment to erode the strength of the Grande Armée. Ultimately, Russia secured victory not through a single conclusive battle, but by systematically degrading the invading force over time.

One of the most compelling visual representations of this strategy is the famous chart by Charles Joseph Minard, which graphically depicts the catastrophic decline in French troop numbers during the campaign.

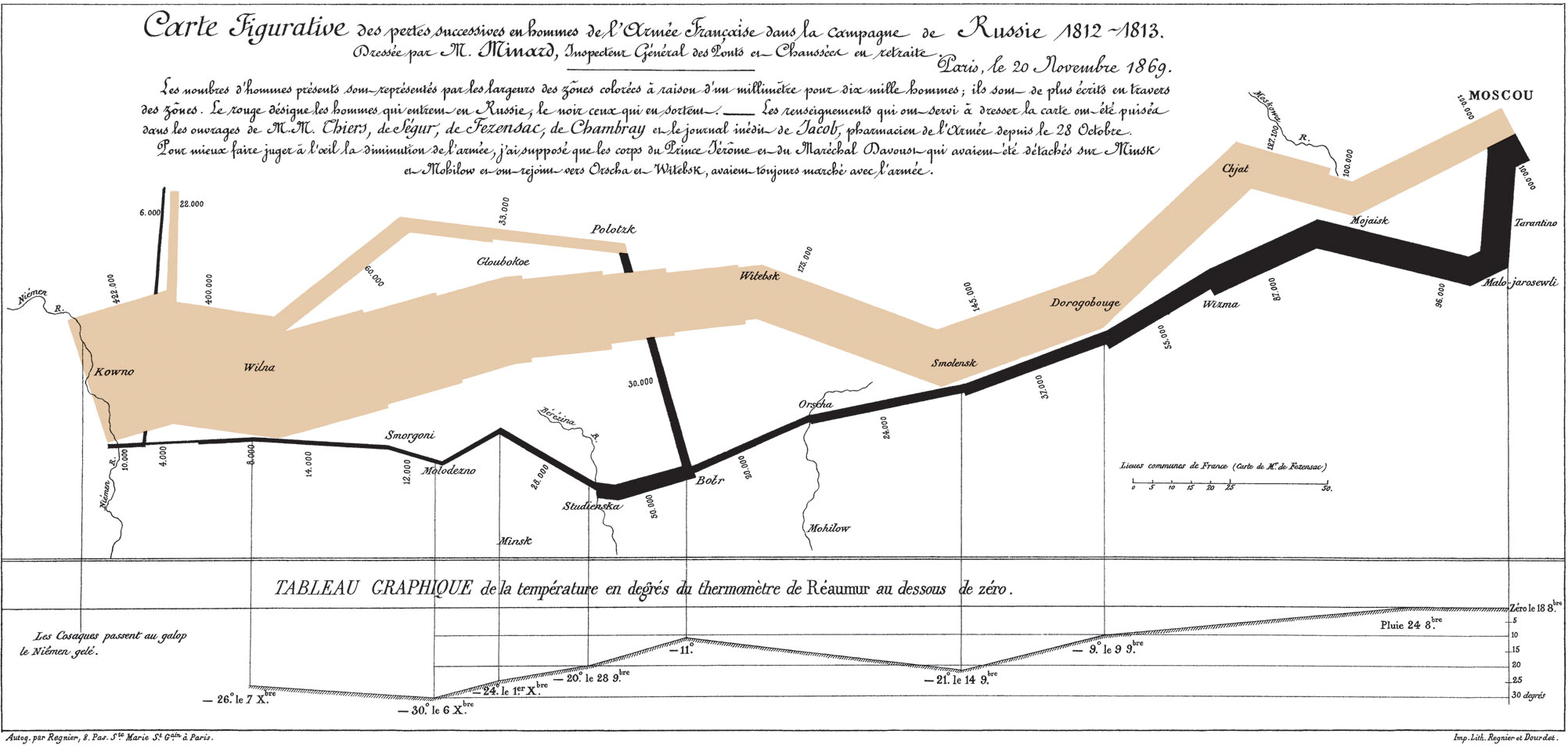
Minard's map of French casualties; see also Attrition warfare against Napoleon

=== Best known ===
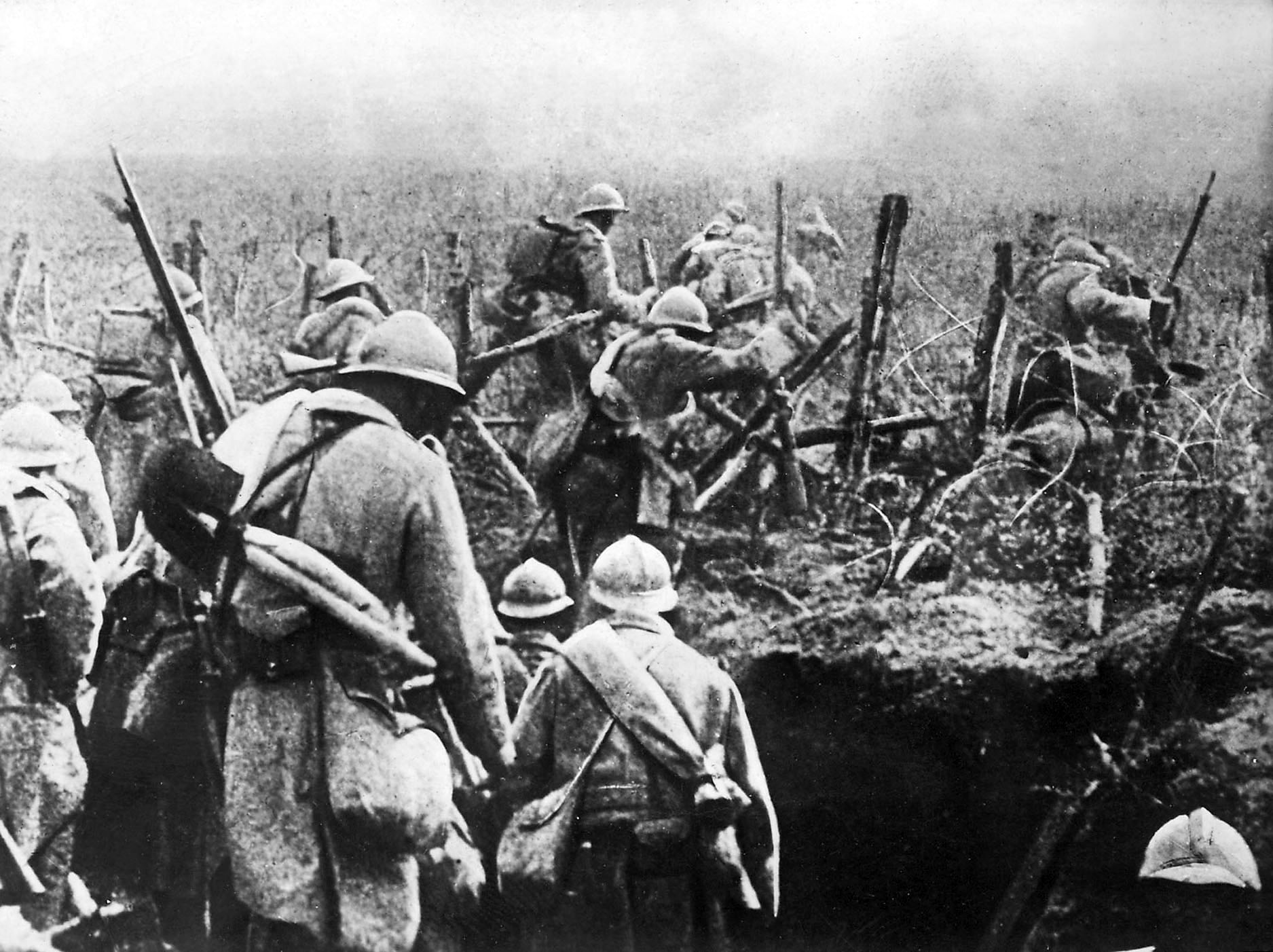
The Battle of Verdun resulted in over 700,000 casualties.

Perhaps the most well-known example of attrition warfare is the fighting on the Western Front during World War I. The war devolved into trench warfare, with defensive positions stretching from Switzerland to the English Channel. In the absence of maneuver warfare, commanders on both sides resorted to repeated frontal assaults in an attempt to wear down the opposing forces.

A notable case is the Battle of Verdun in 1916. German Chief of Staff Erich von Falkenhayn is often associated with a strategy of deliberate attrition, later claiming that his objective was not to capture the city but to destroy the French Army in its defense. He reportedly aimed to “bleed France white,” making Verdun a prime example of attritional warfare tactics.

Attritional dynamics also characterized the Italian Front, particularly in the Battles of the Isonzo. Between June 1915 and November 1917, both sides engaged in a series of offensives along the Isonzo River that yielded high casualties but limited strategic gain.

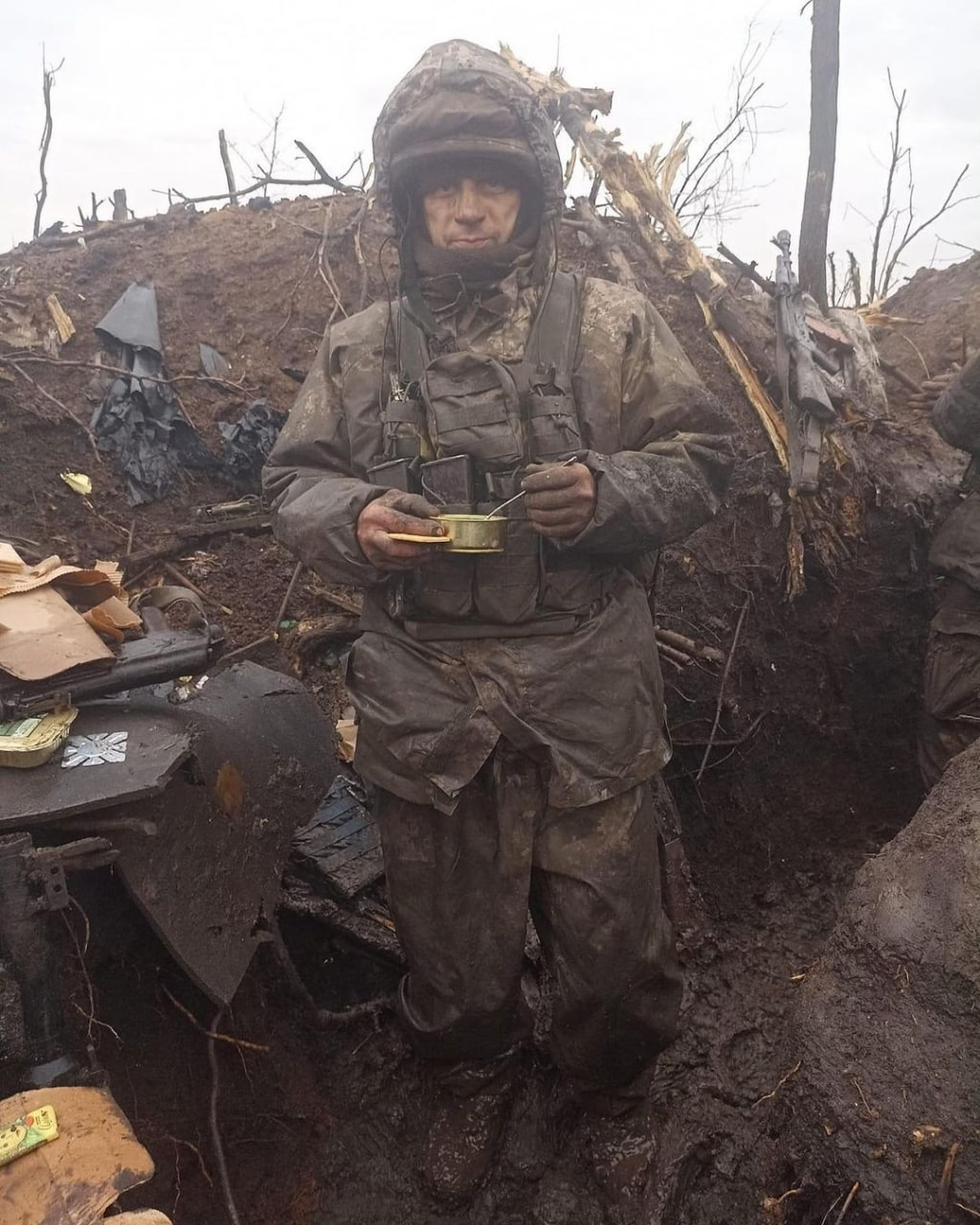
Ukrainian soldier in a trench during the Battle of Bakhmut.

Contemporary conflicts have also demonstrated characteristics of attrition warfare. The Russo-Ukrainian War, particularly battles such as the protracted engagement over Bakhmut, has involved prolonged combat, high casualties, and resource depletion on both sides.

Some historians, including Hew Strachan, have argued that the label of “attrition warfare” in World War I has been over-applied—used post hoc to justify failed offensives. According to this interpretation, the strategy of attrition was often not a deliberate choice, but rather a rationalization after the fact. However, other sources suggest that in some cases—such as Falkenhayn's planning at Verdun—attrition was the intended strategy from the outset.

=== Clear examples of attrition warfare ===
These conflicts or campaigns were explicitly guided by attritional strategies aimed at wearing down the enemy's resources, manpower, or morale.

- The Peloponnesian War, particularly Athens' naval strategy to avoid land battles and stretch Spartan resources
- The War of Attrition between Israel and Egypt (1967–1970)
- The Iran–Iraq War (1980–1988)
- The Russo-Ukrainian War (2022-present), particularly battles such as Bakhmut, where Russian forces shifted toward an attritional strategy
- The 2026 Iran war, particularly the Strait of Hormuz crisis, which developed into a protracted war of attrition, with Iran seeking to exhaust its opponents through sustained missile and drone attacks and economic warfare, while the United States and Israel sought to progressively degrade Iran's military capabilities through sustained airstrikes and blockade

== See also ==
- Protracted war
- Fabian strategy
- Demoralization (warfare)
- Guerrilla warfare
- Asymmetric warfare
- Human wave attack
- Pyrrhic victory
- Loss Exchange Ratio
- Maneuver warfare
- New generation warfare
- Flypaper theory (strategy)
- Mexican standoff
- No-win situation
- Winner's curse
- Win-win game
