= Flypaper theory (strategy) =

In military strategy, the flypaper theory is the idea that it is desirable to draw enemies to a single area, where it is easier to kill them and they are far from one's own vulnerabilities. Perhaps the best description of the benefits of the strategy was given by U.S. Army General Ricardo Sanchez, who was commander of US ground forces in Iraq:

This is what I would call a terrorist magnet, where America, being present here in Iraq, creates a target of opportunity.... But this is exactly where we want to fight them.... This will prevent the American people from having to go through their attacks back in the United States.

The desirability of the strategy depends upon how many new enemies are created by using it, how many of them are drawn to the "flytrap," and how easily they are dispatched.

== Application to the Iraq War ==
According to a report from the Washington, DC–based Center for Strategic International Studies (CSIS), in 2005, foreign fighters comprised about 4 to 10 percent of the estimated 30,000 insurgents in Iraq. Other studies dispute that figure.

== See also ==
- Body count
- Attrition warfare
- 2003 war in Iraq
- War on terrorism
- Honeypot (computing)
