= Bidding fee auction =

Type of all-pay auction

A bidding fee auction, also called a penny auction, is a type of all-pay auction in which all participants must pay a non-refundable fee to place each small incremental bid. The auction is extended each time a new bid is placed, typically by 10 to 20 seconds. Once time expires without a new bid being placed, the last bidder wins the auction and pays the amount of that bid. The auctioneer profits from both the fees charged to place bids and the payment for the winning bid; these combined revenues frequently total more than the value of the item being sold. Empirical evidence suggests that revenues from these auctions exceeds theoretical predictions for rational agents. This has been credited to the sunk cost fallacy. Such auctions are typically held over the Internet, rather than in person.

== How it works ==
Participants pay a fee to purchase bids. Each of the bids increases the price of the item by a small amount, such as one U.S. cent or one British penny, and extends the time of the auction by a few seconds. Bid prices vary by site and quantity purchased at a time, but generally cost 10–50 times the price of the bidding increment. The auctioneer receives the money paid for each bid, plus the final price of the item. A 2010 TechCrunch article about penny auction site MadBid called this business model "a license to print money."

For example, if an item that the seller purchased for $1,000.00 starts bidding at $0.01 and sells at a final price of $100.00, and a bid costing $0.20 raises the price of the item by $0.01, the auctioneer receives $1,999.80 for the 9,999 bids and $100.00 as the final price, a total of $2,099.80, a profit of $1,099.80. If the winning bidder used 2,000 bids in the process, they would have paid $400.00 for the bids plus $100.00 for the final price, a total of $500.00, which is $500.00 less than the retail price. All the other bidders collectively paid $1,599.80 and received nothing.

In January 2012, a reporter for The Guardian wrote, "legions of penny auction sites have folded, including Swoopo, Rapid Bargain and Bid Boogie." The reporter spoke with a representative for MadBid, who denied that the company made false claims and who described the company as having created "a fun shopping experience that requires skill and strategy to land bargains."

== Criticism ==
Due to the possibility of participants spending significant amounts of money and still losing an auction, or ultimately spending more than the retail value of the item they end up winning, some analysts have criticized the model or compared it to gambling, even when operating without fraud. The Better Business Bureau warns consumers, "although not all penny auction sites are scams, some are being investigated as online gambling. BBB recommends you ... know exactly how the bidding works, set a limit for yourself, and be prepared to walk away before you go over that limit." A penny auction may make the seller far more money than the item is worth. Potential fraudulent practices which can disadvantage buyers even more include shill bidding, where a human or software (bot) bidder covertly acting for the seller places bids which make legitimate bidders continue bidding where otherwise the auction would end, and simply not sending out goods for which a price, albeit low, has been paid. Some bidding fee auction sites have been shut down by state governments after investigations. Wavee US, LLC, settled with the Governor's Office of Consumer Protection in Georgia and agreed to close its website after the office received complaints about merchandise not being shipped in a timely fashion. Washington state shut down PennyBiddr after a lawsuit in which the state accused PennyBiddr of using shill bidding to drive up prices and extend auctions. In addition, several auction sites which claimed to be Better Business Bureau "Accredited" were not members of the BBB or had poor ratings with the BBB.

== See also ==
- Dollar auction, a game theory experiment similar to penny auctions
- Unique bid auction, another auction style in which bidders pay for entry and ending prices are very low
