= Auction =

Process of offering goods or services up for bids

An American auctioneer using auction chant at a livestock auction, November 2010

An auction is usually a process of buying and selling goods or services by offering them up for bids, taking bids, and then selling the item to the highest bidder or buying the item from the lowest bidder. Some exceptions to this definition exist and are described in the section about different types. The branch of economic theory dealing with auction types and participants' behavior in auctions is called auction theory.

The open ascending price auction is arguably the most common form of auction and has been used throughout history. Participants bid openly against one another, with each subsequent bid being higher than the previous bid. An auctioneer may announce prices, while bidders submit bids vocally or electronically.

Auctions are applied for trade in diverse contexts. These contexts include antiques, paintings, rare collectibles, expensive wines, commonly traded goods, livestock, radio spectrum, used cars, real estate, online advertising, vacation packages, emission trading, and many more.

== Etymology ==
The word "auction" is derived from auctus, the past participle of the Latin verb augeō, ("I increase").

== History ==
=== Classical antiquity ===
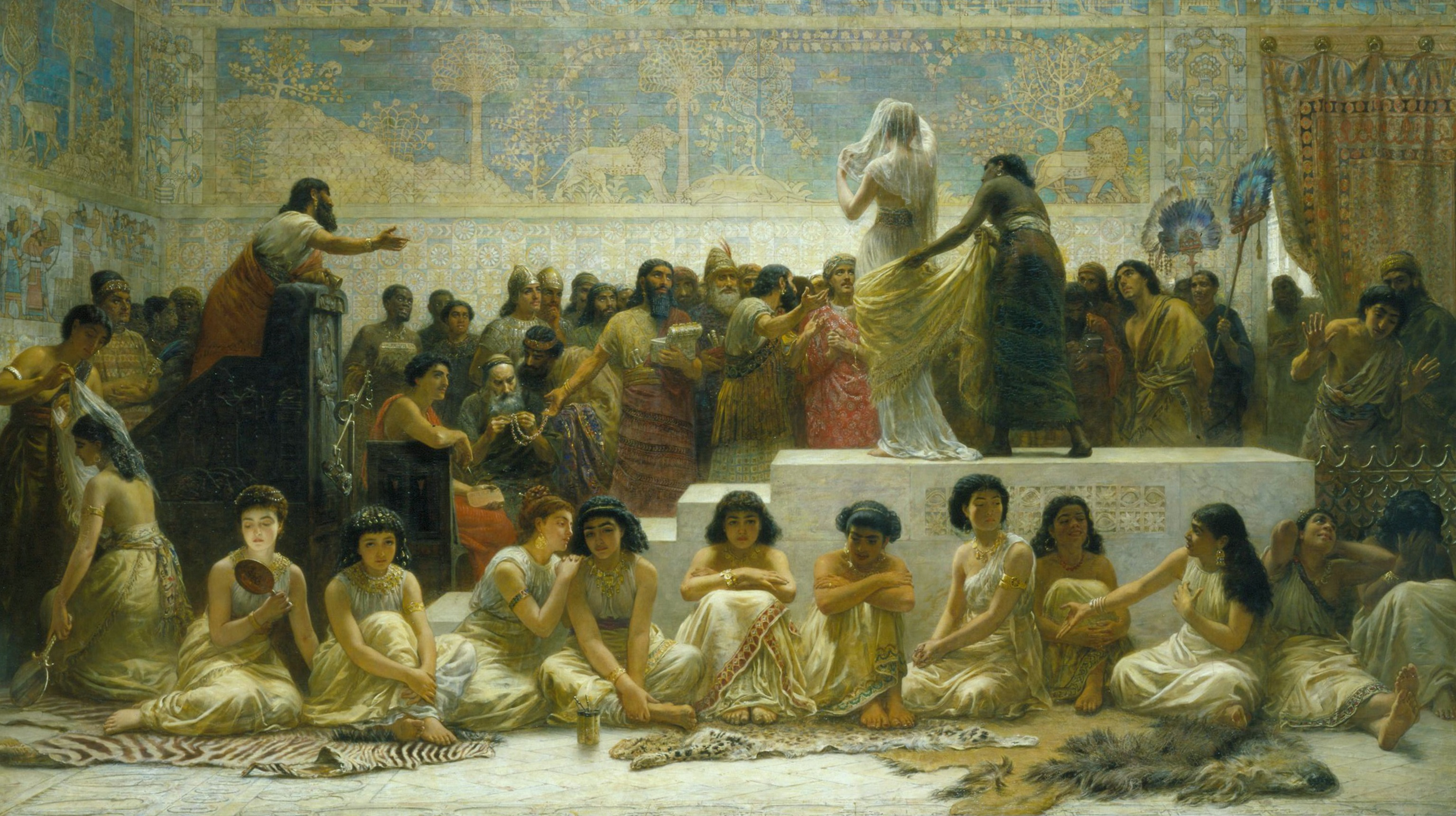
The Babylonian Marriage Market, Edwin Long, 1875

Auctions have been recorded as early as 500 BC. According to Herodotus, in Babylon, auctions of women for marriage were held annually. The auctions began with the woman the auctioneer considered to be the most beautiful and progressed to the least beautiful. It was considered illegal to allow a daughter to be sold outside of the auction method. Attractive maidens were offered in a forward auction to determine the price to be paid by a swain, while unattractive maidens required a reverse auction to determine the price to be paid to a swain.

Auctions took place in Ancient Greece, other Hellenistic societies, and also in Rome. During the Roman Empire, after a military victory, Roman soldiers would often drive a spear into the ground around which the spoils of war were left, to be auctioned off. Slaves, often captured as the "spoils of war", were auctioned in the Forum under the sign of the spear, with the proceeds of sale going toward the war effort.

The Romans also used auctions to liquidate the assets of debtors whose property had been confiscated. For example, Marcus Aurelius sold household furniture to pay off debts, the sales lasting for months. One of the most significant historical auctions was in 193 AD, when the entire Roman Empire was put on the auction block by the Praetorian Guard. On 28 March 193, the Praetorian Guard first killed emperor Pertinax, then offered the empire to the highest bidder. Didius Julianus won the auction at the price of 6,250 drachmas per guard, an act that initiated a brief civil war. Didius was beheaded two months later when Septimius Severus conquered Rome.

From the end of the Roman Empire to the 18th century, auctions lost favor in Europe, while they had never been widespread in Asia. In China, the personal belongings of deceased Buddhist monks were sold at auction as early as the seventh century AD.

=== Modern revival ===
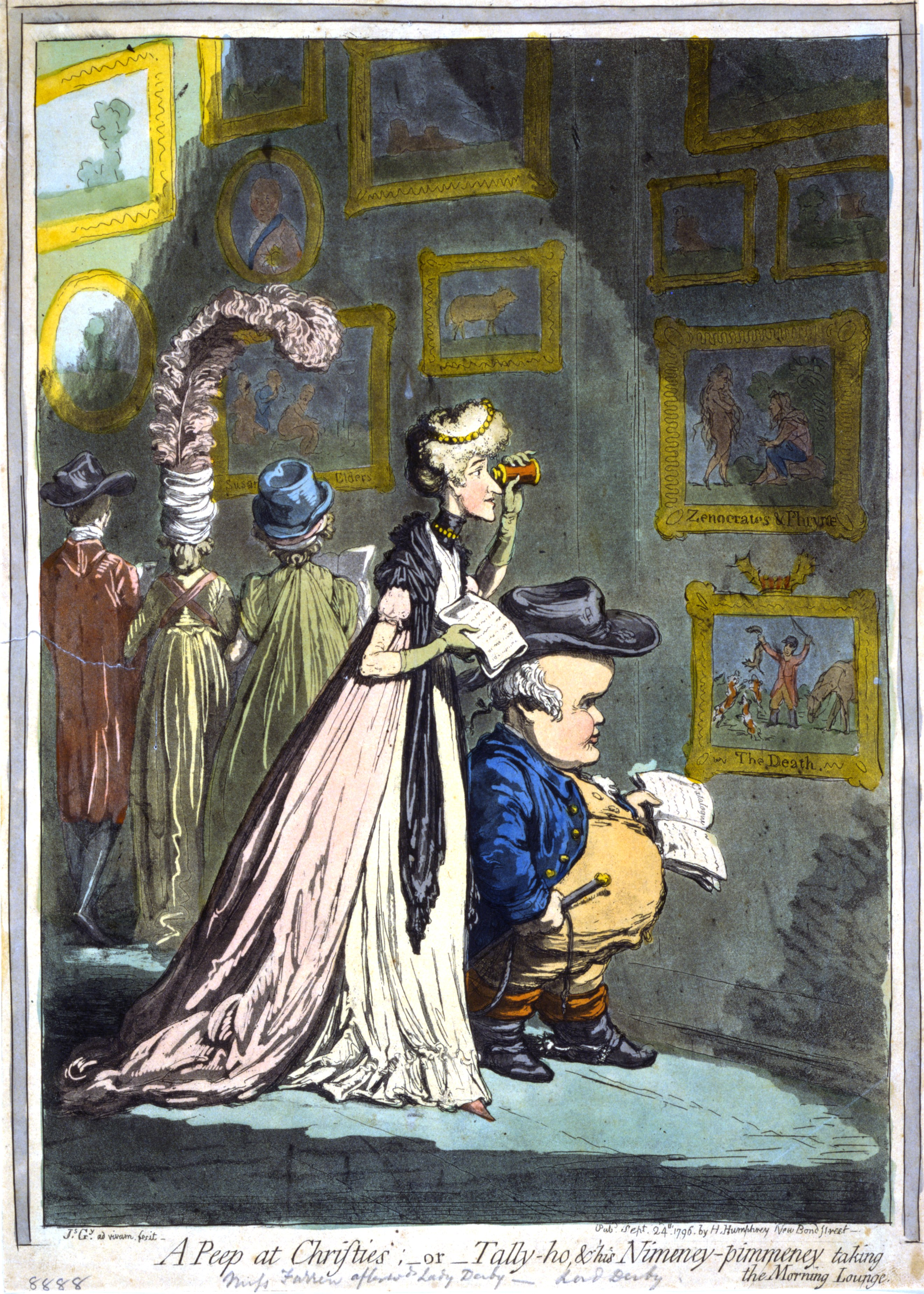
A Peep at Christies (1796) – caricature of actress Elizabeth Farren and huntsman Lord Derby examining paintings at Christie's, by James Gillray

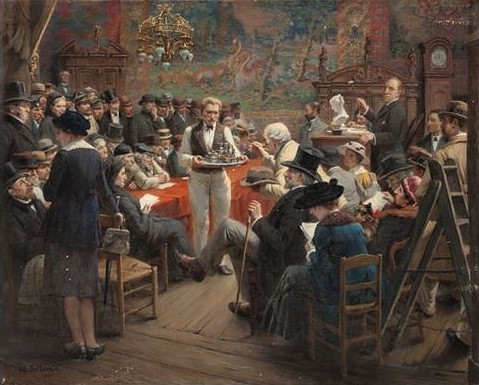
A late 19th Century auction at the Hôtel Drouot, Paris (painting by Albert Bettannier)

The first mention of "auction", according to the Oxford English Dictionary, appeared in 1595. In some parts of England during the 17th and 18th centuries, auctions by candle began to be used for the sale of goods and leaseholds. In a candle auction, the end of the auction was signaled by the expiration of a candle flame, which was intended to ensure that no one could know exactly when the auction would end and make a last-second bid. Sometimes, other unpredictable events, such as a footrace, were used instead of the expiration of a candle. This type of auction was first mentioned in 1641 in the records of the House of Lords. The practice rapidly became popular, and in 1660 Samuel Pepys' diary recorded two occasions when the Admiralty sold surplus ships "by an inch of candle". Pepys also relates a hint from a highly successful bidder who had observed that, just before expiring, a candle-wick always flares up slightly: on seeing this, he would shout his final – and winning – bid.

The London Gazette began reporting on the auctioning of artwork in the coffeehouses and taverns of London in the late 17th century. The first known auction house in the world was the Stockholm Auction House, Sweden (Stockholms Auktionsverk), founded by Baron Claes Rålamb in 1674. Sotheby's, currently the world's second-largest auction house, was founded in London on 11 March 1744, when Samuel Baker presided over the disposal of "several hundred scarce and valuable" books from the library of an acquaintance. Christie's, now the world's largest auction house, was founded by James Christie in 1766 in London and published its first auction catalog that year, although newspaper advertisements of Christie's sales dating from 1759 have been found.

Other early auction houses that are still in operation include Göteborgs Auktionsverk (1681), Dorotheum (1707), Uppsala auktionskammare (1731), Mallams (1788), Bonhams (1793), Phillips de Pury & Company (1796), Freeman's (1805) and Lyon & Turnbull (1826).

By the end of the 18th century, auctions of art works were commonly held in taverns and coffeehouses. These auctions were held daily, and auction catalogs were printed to announce available items. In some cases, these catalogs were elaborate works of art themselves, containing considerable detail about the items being auctioned. At the time, Christie's established a reputation as a leading auction house, taking advantage of London's status as the major centre of the international art trade after the French Revolution. The Great Slave Auction took place in 1859 and is recorded as the second largest single sale of enslaved people in U.S. history — with 436 men, women and children being sold. During the American Civil War, goods seized by armies were sold at auction by the Colonel of the division. Thus, some of today's auctioneers in the U.S. carry the unofficial title of "colonel". Tobacco auctioneers in the southern United States in the late 19th century had a style that mixed traditions of 17th century England with chants of slaves from Africa.

=== Rise of the internet ===
The development of the internet has led to a significant rise in the use of auctions, as auctioneers can solicit bids via the internet from a wide range of buyers in a much larger variety of commodities than was previously practical. In the 1990s, the multi-attribute auction was invented to negotiate extensive conditions of construction and electricity contracts via auction. Also during this time, OnSale.com developed the Yankee auction as its trademark. In the early 2000s, the Brazilian auction was invented as a new type of auction to trade gas through electronic auctions for Linde plc in Brazil. With the emergence of the internet, online auctions have developed, with eBay being the most typical example. For example, if someone owns a rare item, they can display the item through an online auction platform. Interested parties may place bids, with the highest bidder winning the opportunity to purchase the item. Online auctions allow more people to participate and also make traditional auction theory more complex.

== Economic significance ==
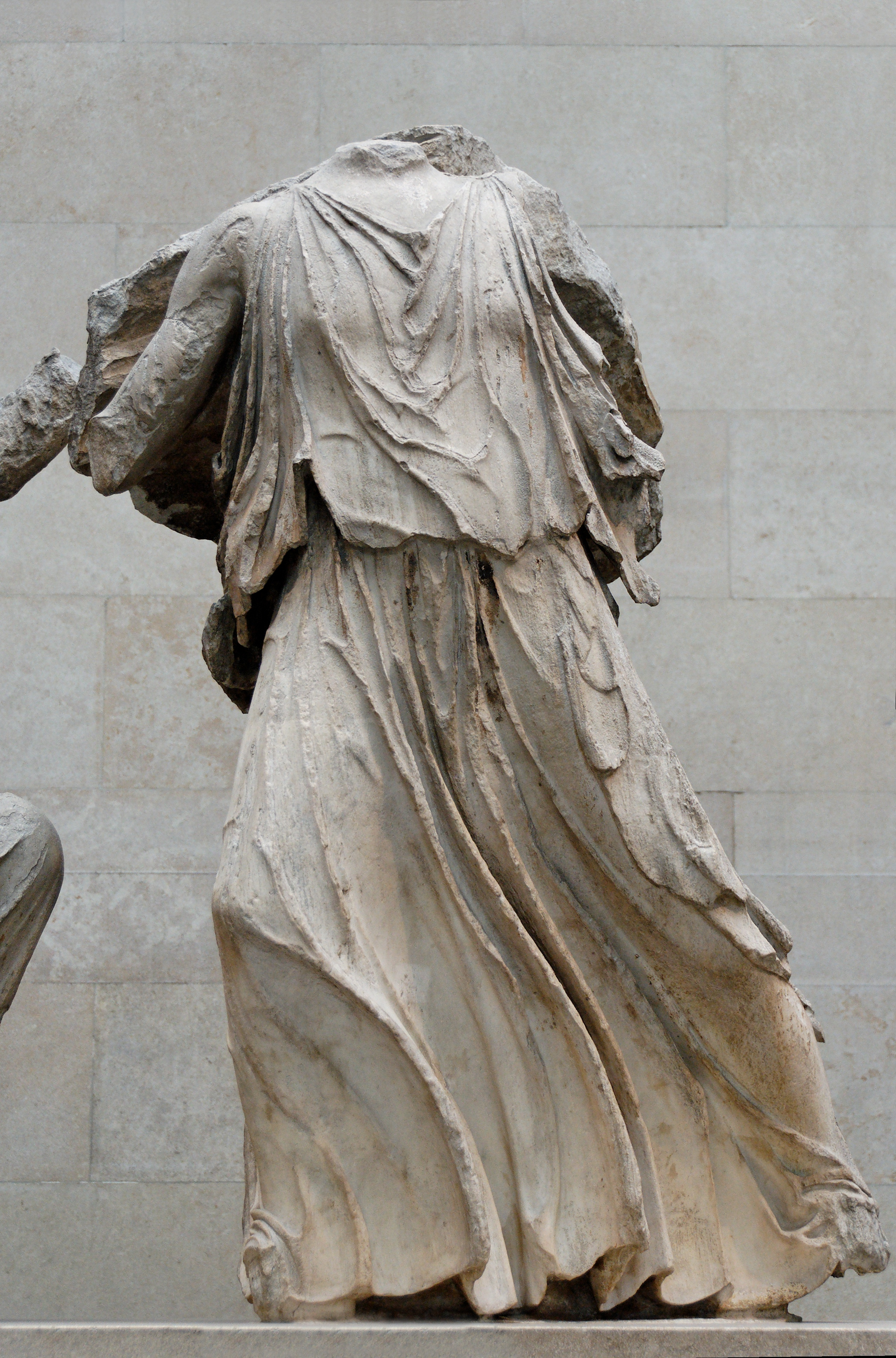
Artemis, Ancient Greek marble sculpture. In 2007, a Roman-era bronze sculpture of "Artemis and the Stag" was sold at Sotheby's in New York for US$28.6 million, by far exceeding its estimates and at the time setting the new record as the most expensive sculpture as well as work from antiquity ever sold at auction.

By increasing visibility of an item and therefore demand, auctions can make an extremely rare item more likely to sell for a higher price.

In 2008, the US National Auctioneers Association reported that the gross revenue of the auction industry for that year was approximately $268.4 billion, with the fastest growing sectors being agricultural, machinery, equipment, and residential real estate auctions.

The auctions with the largest revenue for the government are often spectrum auctions (typical revenue is estimated in billions of euros) and quota auctions. In 2019, Russia's crab quota was auctioned for €2 billion. Between 1999 and 2002, the British government auctioned off their gold reserves, raising approximately $3.5 billion.

The most expensive item to ever be sold in an auction is Leonardo da Vinci's Salvator Mundi in 2017 ($450.3 million).

In 2018, the yearly revenues of the two biggest auction houses were $5 billion (Christie's) and $4 billion (Sotheby's).

== Types ==
Auctions come in a variety of types and categories, which are sometimes not mutually exclusive. Typification of auctions is considered to be a part of Auction theory. The economists Paul Milgrom and Robert B. Wilson were awarded the 2020 Nobel Prize for the introduction of new auction types (or formats). Auction types share features, which can be summarized into the following list.

=== Participants ===
| Forward auction | Reverse auction | Double auction |
$\operatorname{v}_{1\ldots m}$ stand for sellers and $\operatorname{c}_{1..n}$ for buyers

Auctions can differ in the number and type of participants. There are two types of participants: a buyer and a seller. A buyer pays to acquire a certain good or service, while a seller offers goods or services for money or barter exchange. There can be single or multiple buyers and single or multiple sellers in an auction. If just one seller and one buyer are participating, the process is not considered to be an auction.

| | Single seller | Multiple sellers |
|---|---|---|
| Single buyer | Trade | Reverse auction |
| Multiple buyers | Forward auction | Double auction |

The forward auction is the most common type of auction — a seller offers item(s) for sale and expects the highest price. A reverse auction is a type of auction in which the roles of the buyer and the seller are reversed, with the primary objective to drive purchase prices downward. While ordinary auctions provide suppliers the opportunity to find the best price among interested buyers, reverse auctions and buyer-determined auctions give buyers a chance to find the lowest-price supplier. During a reverse auction, suppliers may submit multiple offers, usually as a response to competing suppliers' offers, bidding down the price of a good or service to the lowest price they are willing to receive. A reverse price auction is not necessarily 'descending-price' — the reverse Dutch auction is an ascending-price auction because forward Dutch auctions are descending. By revealing the competing bids in real-time to every participating supplier, reverse auctions promote "information transparency". This, coupled with the dynamic bidding process, improves the chances of reaching the fair market value of the item.

A double auction is a combination of both forward and reverse auctions. A Walrasian auction or Walrasian tâtonnement is a double auction in which the auctioneer takes bids from both buyers and sellers in a market of multiple goods. The auctioneer progressively either raises or drops the current proposed price depending on the bids of both buyers and sellers, the auction concluding when supply and demand exactly balance. As a high price tends to dampen demand while a low price tends to increase demand, in theory there is a particular price somewhere in the middle where supply and demand will match. A Barter double auction is an auction where every participant has a demand and an offer consisting of multiple attributes and no money is involved. For the mathematical modelling of satisfaction level, Euclidean distance is used, where the offer and demand are treated as vectors.

=== Price development ===
Auctions can be categorized into three types of procedures for auctions depending on the occurrence of a price development during an auction run and its causes.

==== Driven by bidders only ====
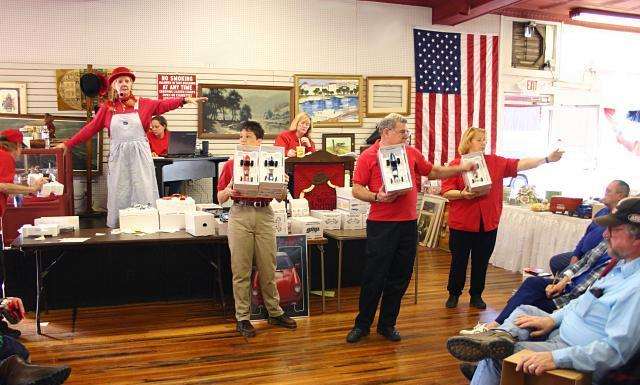
An auctioneer and assistants scan the crowd for bidders.

- English auction, also known as an open ascending price auction. This type of auction is arguably the most common form of auction in use today. Participants bid openly against one another, with each subsequent bid required to be higher than the previous bid. An auctioneer may announce prices, bidders may call out their bids themselves (or have a proxy call out a bid on their behalf), or bids may be submitted electronically with the highest current bid publicly displayed. In some cases a maximum bid might be left with the auctioneer, who may bid on behalf of the bidder according to the bidder's instructions. The auction ends when no participant is willing to bid further, at which point the highest bidder pays their bid. Alternatively, if the seller has set a minimum sale price in advance (the 'reserve' price) and the final bid does not reach that price the item will remain unsold. Sometimes the auctioneer sets a minimum amount, sometimes known as a bidding increment, by which the next bid must exceed the current highest bid. The most significant distinguishing factor of this auction type is that the current highest bid is always available to potential bidders, although at that time there may be higher absentee bids held by the auctioneer which are not known to potential bidders. The English auction is commonly used for selling goods, most prominently antiques and artwork, but also secondhand goods and real estate.
- Auction by the candle. A type of auction, used in England for selling ships, in which the highest bid laid on the table wins after a burning candle goes out.
- Scottish auction is an auction where all bidding should be completed within a certain time interval, which allows bidders an appropriate amount of time for consideration and avoids precipitate actions.

==== Partially driven by time ====
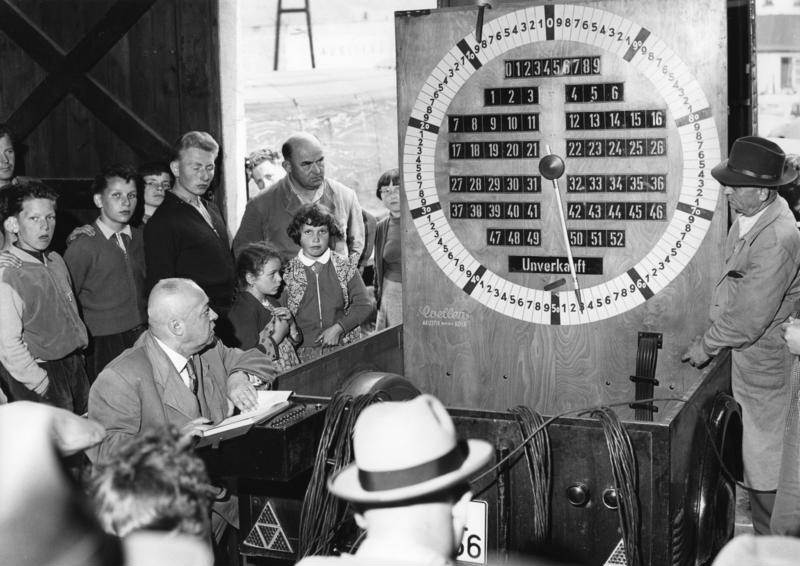
A 1957 Dutch auction in Germany to sell fruit

- Dutch auction also known as an open descending price auction. In the traditional Dutch auction the auctioneer begins with a high asking price for some quantity of like items; the price is lowered until a participant is willing to accept the auctioneer's price for some quantity of the goods in the lot or until the seller's reserve price is met. If the first bidder does not purchase the entire lot, the auctioneer continues lowering the price until all of the items have been bid for or the reserve price is reached. Items are allocated based on bid order; the highest bidder selects their item(s) first followed by the second highest bidder, etc. In a modification, all of the winning participants pay only the last announced price for the items that they bid on. The Dutch auction is named for its best known example, the Dutch tulip auctions. ("Dutch auction" is also sometimes used to describe online auctions where several identical goods are sold simultaneously to an equal number of high bidders). In addition to cut flower sales in the Netherlands, Dutch auctions have also been used for perishable commodities such as fish and tobacco. The Dutch auction is not widely used, except in market orders in stock or currency exchanges, which are functionally identical.
- Japanese auction is a variation of the Dutch auction with a low initial price that increases over time. As the price rises, participants must either signal intent to continue bidding or drop out of the auction, and no participant may enter or re-enter the auction once it has begun. Once only one participant remains in the auction, the auction ends and that participant wins the item at the current price. It has similarities to the ante in Poker.

==== Single shot ====
- First-price sealed-bid auction, or a sealed-bid first-price auction/blind auction, is a type of auction where all bidders simultaneously submit sealed bids so that no bidder knows the bid of any other participant. The highest bidder pays the price they submitted. This type of auction is distinct from the English auction, in that bidders can only submit one bid each. Furthermore, as bidders cannot see the bids of other participants they cannot adjust their own bids accordingly. From the theoretical perspective, this kind of bid process has been argued to be strategically equivalent to the Dutch auction. However, empirical evidence from laboratory experiments has shown that Dutch auctions with high clock speeds yield lower prices than FPSB auctions. What are effectively sealed first-price auctions are commonly called tendering for procurement by companies and organisations, particularly for government contracts and auctions for mining leases.
- Vickrey auction, also known as a sealed-bid second-price auction. This is identical to the sealed first-price auction except that the winning bidder pays the second-highest bid rather than their own. Vickrey auctions are extremely important in auction theory, and commonly used in automated contexts such as real-time bidding for online advertising, but rarely in non-automated contexts.

=== Properties of auctioned goods ===
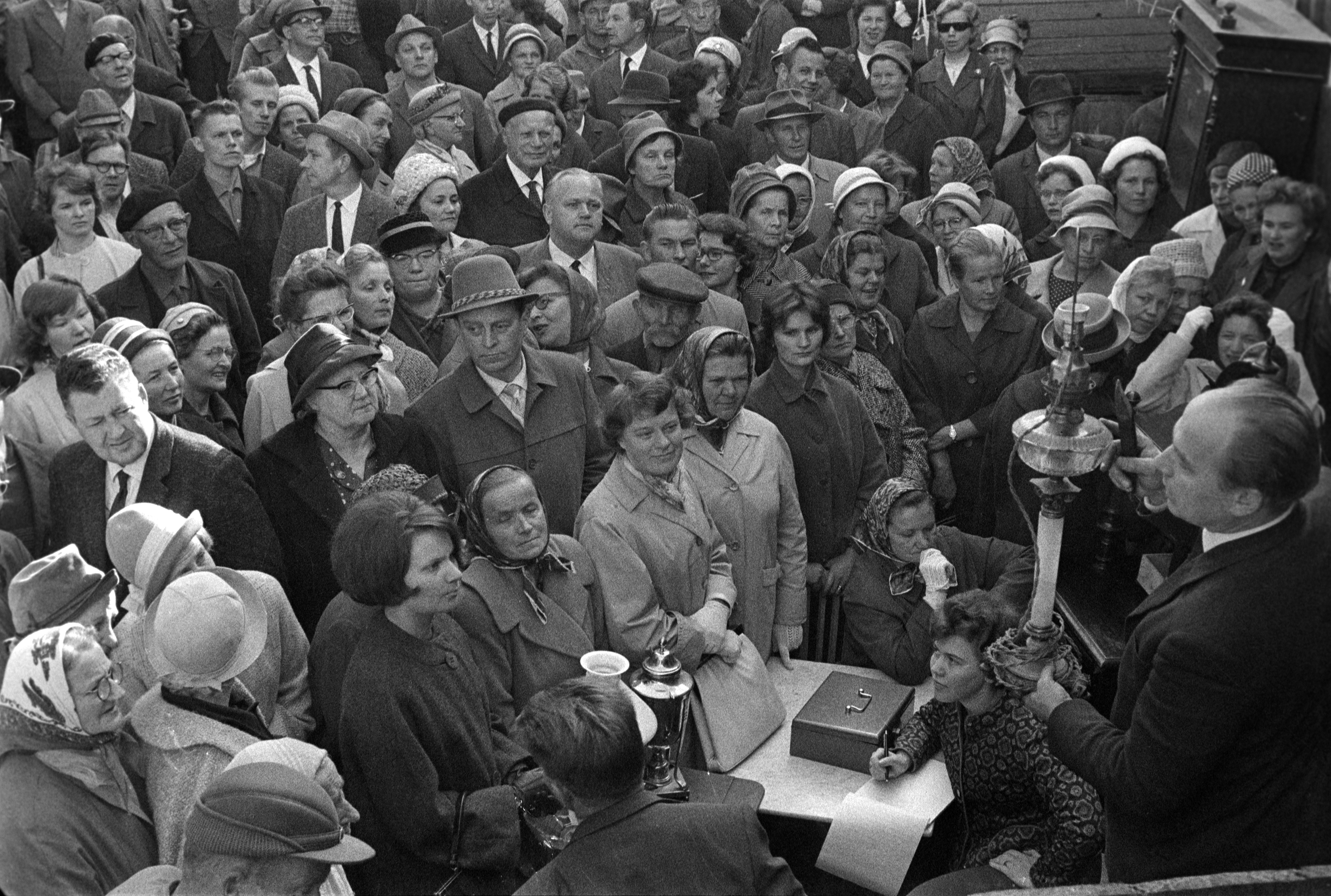
The auction in Oulu, Finland, in September 1962. Auctioneer shows a table lamp with a final price of FIM 6,100.

Multiunit auctions sell more than one identical item at a time, rather than having separate auctions for each. This type can be further classified as either a uniform price auction or a discriminatory price auction. An example for them is spectrum auctions.

A combinatorial auction is any auction for the simultaneous sale of more than one item where bidders can place bids on an "all-or-nothing" basis on "packages" rather than just individual items. That is, a bidder can specify that they will pay for items A and B, but only if they get both. In combinatorial auctions, determining the winning bidder(s) can be a complex process where even the bidder with the highest individual bid is not guaranteed to win. For example, in an auction with four items (W, X, Y and Z), if Bidder A offers $50 for items W & Y, Bidder B offers $30 for items W & X, Bidder C offers $5 for items X & Z and Bidder D offers $30 for items Y & Z, the winners will be Bidders B & D while Bidder A misses out because the combined bids of Bidders B & D is higher ($60) than for Bidders A and C ($55). Deferred-acceptance auction is a special case of a combinatorial auction.

Another special case of a combinatorial auction is the combinatorial clock auction (CCA), which combines a clock auction, during which bidders may provide their confirmations in response to the rising prices, with a subsequantial sealed bid auction, in which bidders submit sealed package bids. The auctioneer uses the final bids to compute the best value allocation and the Vickrey payments.

Generalized first-price auctions and Generalized second-price auctions offer slots for multiple bidders instead of making a single deal. The bidders get the slots according to the ranking of their bids. The second-price ruling is derived from the Vickrey auction and means the final deal sealing for the number one bidder is based on the second bidder's price.

=== Reserve price ===
A No-reserve auction (NR), also known as an absolute auction, is an auction in which the item for sale will be sold regardless of price. From the seller's perspective, advertising an auction as having no reserve price can be desirable because it potentially attracts a greater number of bidders due to the possibility of a bargain. If more bidders attend the auction, a higher price might ultimately be achieved because of heightened competition from bidders. This contrasts with a reserve auction, where the item for sale may not be sold if the final bid is not high enough to satisfy the seller. In practice, an auction advertised as "absolute" or "no-reserve" may nonetheless still not sell to the highest bidder on the day, for example, if the seller withdraws the item from the auction or extends the auction period indefinitely, although these practices may be restricted by law in some jurisdictions or under the terms of sale available from the auctioneer.

A reserve auction is an auction where the item for sale may not be sold if the final bid is not high enough to satisfy the seller; that is, the seller reserves the right to accept or reject the highest bid. In these cases, a set 'reserve' price known to the auctioneer, but not necessarily to the bidders, may have been set, below which the item may not be sold. If the seller announces to the bidders the reserve price, it is a public reserve price auction. In contrast, if the seller does not announce the reserve price before the sale, it is a secret reserve price auction. However, potential bidders may be able to deduce an approximate reserve price, if one exists at all, from any estimate given in advance by the auction house. The reserve price may be fixed or discretionary. In the latter case, the decision to accept a bid is deferred to the auctioneer, who may accept a bid that is marginally below it. A reserve auction is safer for the seller than a no-reserve auction as they are not required to accept a low bid, but this could result in a lower final price if less interest is generated in the sale.

=== Price of bidding ===
An all-pay auction is an auction in which all bidders must pay their bids regardless of whether they win. The highest bidder wins the item. All-pay auctions are primarily of academic interest, and may be used to model lobbying or bribery (bids are political contributions) or competitions such as a running race. Bidding fee auction, a variation of all-pay auction, also known as a penny auction, often requires that each participant must pay a fixed price to place each bid, typically one penny (hence the name) higher than the current bid. When an auction's time period expires, the highest bidder wins the item and must pay a final bid price. Unlike in a conventional auction, the final price is typically much lower than the value of the item, but all bidders (not just the winner) will have paid for each bid placed; the winner will buy the item at a very low price (plus price of rights-to-bid used), all the losers will have paid, and the seller will typically receive significantly more than the value of the item. A senior auction is a variation on the all-pay auction, and has a defined loser in addition to the winner. The top two bidders must pay their full final bid amounts, and only the highest wins the auction. The intent is to make the high bidders bid above their upper limits. In the final rounds of bidding, when the current losing party has hit their maximum bid, they are encouraged to bid over their maximum (seen as a small loss) to avoid losing their maximum bid with no return (a very large loss). Another variation of all-pay auction, the top-up auction is primarily used for charity events. Losing bidders must pay the difference between their bid and the next lowest bid. The winning bidder pays the amount bid for the item, without top-up. In a Chinese auction, bidders make sealed bids in advance and their probability of winning grows with the relative size of their bids.

=== Structure of a bid ===
In usual auctions like the English one, bids are prices. In Dutch and Japanese auctions, the bids are confirmations. In a version of the Brazilian auction, bids are numbers of units being traded. Structure elements of a bid are called attributes. If a bid is one number like price, it is a single-attribute auction. If bids consists of multiple-attributes, it is a multi-attribute auction.

A Yankee auction is a single-attribute multiunit auction running like a Dutch auction, where the bids are the portions of a total amount of identical units. The amount of auctioned items is firm in a Yankee auction unlike a Brazilian auction. The portions of the total amount, bidders can bid, are limited to lower numbers than the total amount. Therefore, only a portion of the total amount will be traded for the best price and the rest to the suboptimal prices.

=== Visibility of bids ===
In an English auction, all current bids are visible to all bidders and in a sealed-bid auction, bidders only get to know if their bid was the best. Best/not best auctions are sealed-bid auctions with multiple bids, where the bidders submit their prices like in English auction and get responses about the leadership of their bid. Rank auction is an extension of best/not best auction, where the bidders also see the rank of their bids. Traffic-light auction shows traffic lights to bidders as a response to their bids. These traffic lights depend on the position of the last bid in the distribution of all bids.

=== Buyout option ===
A buyout auction is an auction with an additional set price (the 'buyout' price) that any bidder can accept at any time during the auction, thereby immediately ending the auction and winning the item. This means that if an item offers its buyout price at the beginning, one participant can stop all other potential participants from bidding at all, or stop the bidding process before the bid price has reached the buyout price. If no bidder chooses to utilize the buyout option before the end of bidding, the highest bidder wins and pays their bid. Buyout options can be either temporary or permanent. In a temporary-buyout auction the option to buy out the auction is not available after the first bid is placed. In a permanent-buyout auction the buyout option remains available throughout the entire auction until the close of bidding. The buyout price can either remain the same throughout the entire auction, or vary throughout according to rules or simply as decided by the seller.

=== Winner selection ===
The winner selection in most auctions selects the best bid. Unique bid auctions offer a special winner selection: the winner is the bidder with the lowest unique bid. The Chinese auction selects a winner partially based on randomness.

The final price for the selected winner is not always conducted according to their final bid. In the case of the second-price ruling as in a Vickrey auction, the final price for the winner is based on the second bidder's price. A Proxy bid is a special case of second-price ruling used by eBay, where a predefined increment is added to the second highest bid in response to a yet higher bid.

Auctions with more than one winner are called multi-winner auctions. Multiunit auction, Combinatorial auction, Generalized first-price auction and Generalized second-price auction are multi-winner auctions.

=== Cascading ===
Auctions can be cascaded, one after the other. For instance, an Amsterdam auction is a type of premium auction which begins as an English auction. Once only two bidders remain, each submits a sealed bid. The higher bidder wins, paying either the first or second price. Both finalists receive a premium: a proportion of the excess of the second price over the third price (at which English auction ended). An Anglo-Dutch auction starts as an English or Japanese auction and then continues as a Dutch auction with a reduced number of bidders. A French auction is a preliminary sealed-bid auction before the actual auction, whose reserve price it determines. A sequential auction is an auction where the bidders can participate in a sequence of auctions. A Calcutta auction is a subtype of sequential auction, where the ordering in the sequence is determined by random. A simultaneous ascending auction is an opposite of a sequential auction, where the auctions are run in parallel.

=== Other features ===
The silent auction is a variant of the English auction in which bids are written on a sheet of paper. At the predetermined end of the auction, the highest listed bidder wins the item. This auction is often used in charity events, with many items auctioned simultaneously and "closed" at a common finish time. The auction is "silent" in that there is no auctioneer selling individual items; the bidders write their bids on a bidding sheet often left on a table near the item. At charity auctions, bid sheets usually have a fixed starting amount, predetermined bid increments, and a "guaranteed bid" amount which works the same as a "buy now" amount. Other variations of this type of auction may include sealed bids. The highest bidder pays the price they submitted.

In private value auctions, every bidder has their own valuation of the auctioned good. A common value auction is opposite, where the valuation of the auctioned good is identical among the bidders.

== Contexts ==
The range of auctions' contexts is extremely wide and one can buy almost anything, from a house to an endowment policy and everything in between. Some of the recent developments have been the use of the Internet both as a means of disseminating information about various auctions and as a vehicle for hosting auctions themselves.

=== Human commodity auctions ===
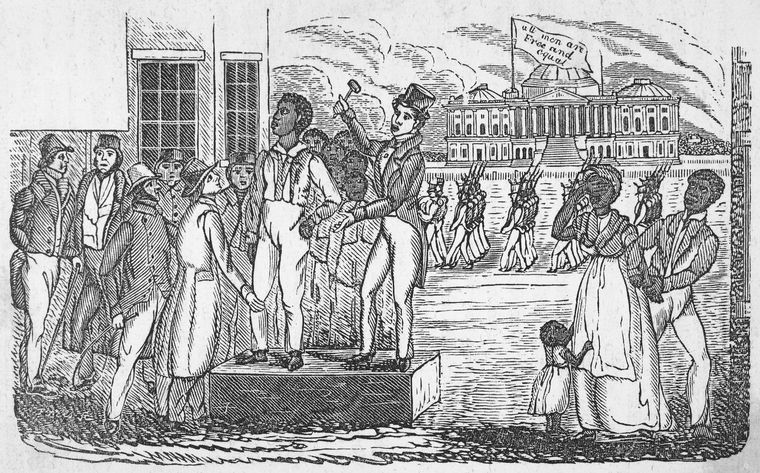
A slave auction

As already mentioned in the history section, auctions have been used to trade commodified people from the very first. Auctions have been used in slave markets throughout history until modern times in the post-Gaddafi era Libya. The word for slave auction in the Atlantic slave trade was scramble. A child auction is a Swedish and Finnish historical practice of selling children into slavery-like conditions by authorities using a descending English auction. Fattigauktion is a similar Swedish practice involving poor people being auctioned to church organizations. Trade of wives by auctions was also a common practice throughout history. For instance, in the old English custom of wife selling, a wife was divorced by selling her in a public auction for the highest bid. ISIS conducted slave auctions to sell up to 7,000 Yazidi women as reported in 2020.

A virginity auction is the voluntary practice of individuals seeking to sell their own virginity to the highest bid. Cricket players are routinely put up for auction, whereby cricket teams can bid for their services. Indian Premier League (IPL) started annual public auctioning of cricket players in 2008 as an entertainment for mass consumption. Also, Bangladesh Premier League conducts cricket player auctions, starting in 2012.

=== Real estate auctions ===
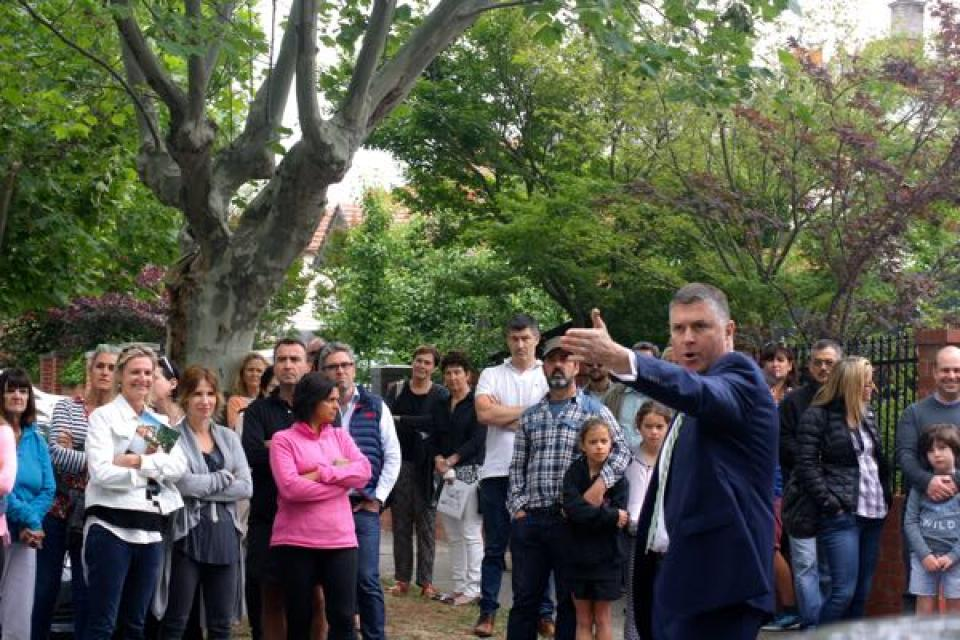
An estate agent conducting an auction of real estate in Melbourne, Victoria, Australia

In some countries, such as Australia, auctioning is a common method for the sale of real estate. Auctions were traditionally used as an alternative to the private sale/treaty method to sell a property that, due to its unique characteristics, was difficult to determine a price for. The law does not require a vendor to disclose their reserve price prior to the auction. During the 1990s and 2000s, auctions became the primary method for the sale of real estate in the two largest cities, Melbourne and Sydney. This was largely due to the fact that in a private sale the vendor has disclosed the price that they want, and potential purchasers would attempt to low-ball the price, whereas in an auction purchasers do not know what the vendor wants, and thus need to keep lifting the price until the reserve price is reached.

The method has been the subject of increased controversy during the twenty-first century as house prices sky-rocketed. The rapidly rising housing market saw many homes, especially in Victoria and New South Wales, selling for significantly more than both the vendor's reserve price and the advertised price range. Subsequently, the auction systems' lack of transparency about the value of the property was brought into question, with estate agents and their vendor clients being accused of "under-quoting". Significant attention was given to the matter by the Australian media, with the government in Victoria eventually bowing to pressure and implementing changes to legislation in an effort to increase transparency.

In the UK, historically, auction houses were perceived to sell properties which might have been repossessed — where a home owner has failed to make regular mortgage payments — or were probate sales ( i.e., a family home being sold by the heirs). However, more recently, selling at auction has become an alternative to a normal property sale, due to the speedy nature of the entire process.

In China, land auctions are under the sole control of local government officials. Because some developers may use bribes to please government officials to obtain the right to purchase the land, the central government requires that future land auctions be conducted using a spectrum auction in order to prevent the spread of corruption. Although this method cannot completely solve the problem of corruption, it is still a significant contribution to the auction.

=== Auctions by authorities ===
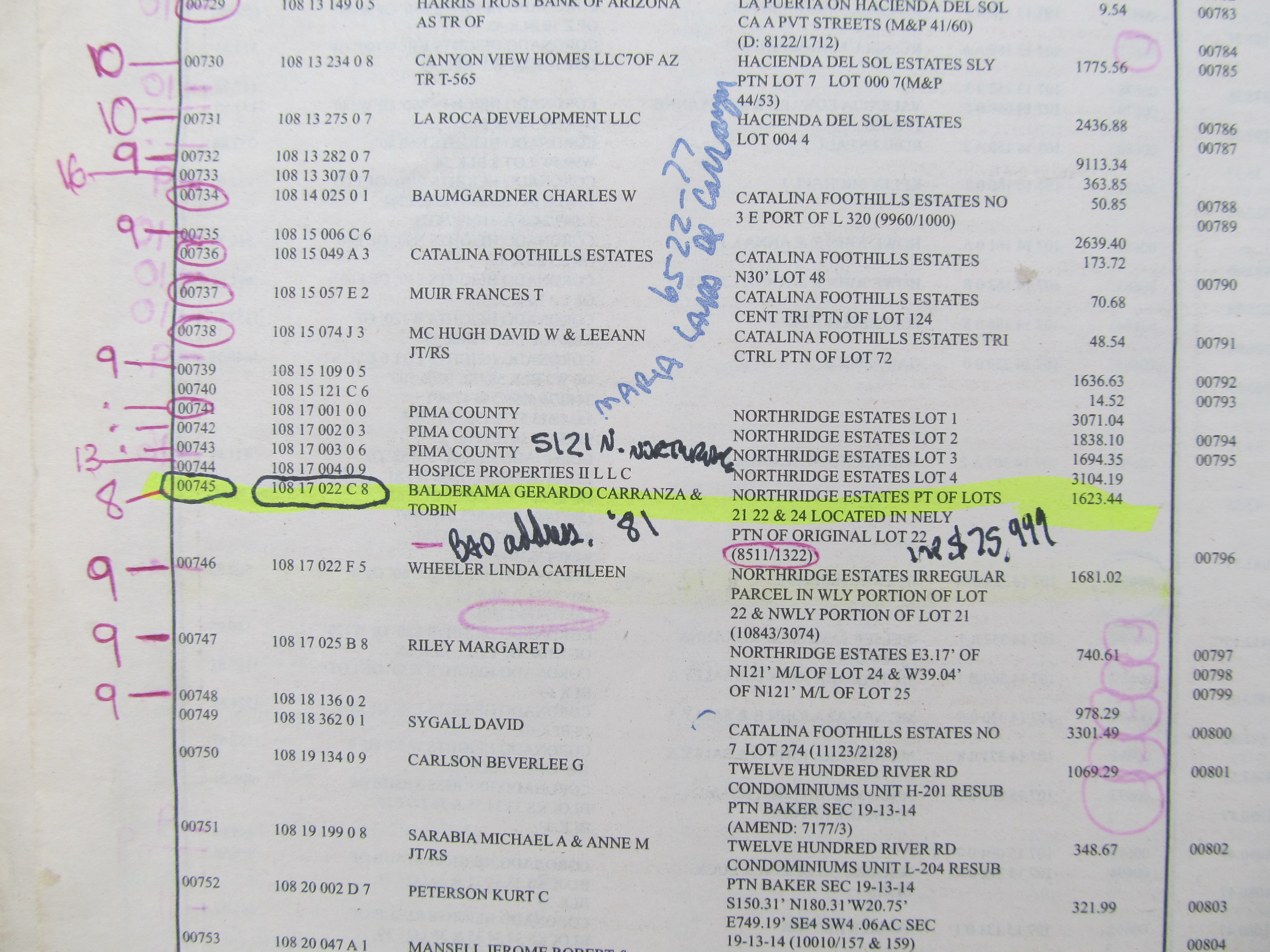
Pima County, Arizona delinquent property tax list for auction by the County Treasurer

A government auction is simply an auction held on behalf of a government body generally at a general sale. Items for sale are often surplus needed to be liquidated. Auctions ordered by estate executors enter the assets of individuals who have perhaps died intestate (those who have died without leaving a will), or in debt. In legal contexts where forced auctions occur, as when one's farm or house is sold at auction on the courthouse steps. Property seized for non-payment of property taxes, or under foreclosure, is sold in this manner. Police auctions are generally held at general auctions, although some forces use online sites including eBay, to dispose of lost and found and seized goods. Debt auctions, in which governments issue and sell debt obligations, such as bonds, to investors. The auction is usually sealed and the uniform price paid by the investors is typically the best non-winning bid. In most cases, investors can also place so-called non-competitive bids, which indicates interest to purchase the debt obligation at the resulting price, whatever it may be. Some states use courts to run such auctions. In spectrum auctions conducted by the government, companies purchase licenses to use portions of the electromagnetic spectrum for communications (e.g., mobile phone networks). In certain jurisdictions, if a storage facility's tenant fails to pay rent, the contents of their locker(s) may be sold at a public auction. Several television shows focus on such auctions, including Storage Wars and Auction Hunters.

=== Commodity auctions ===
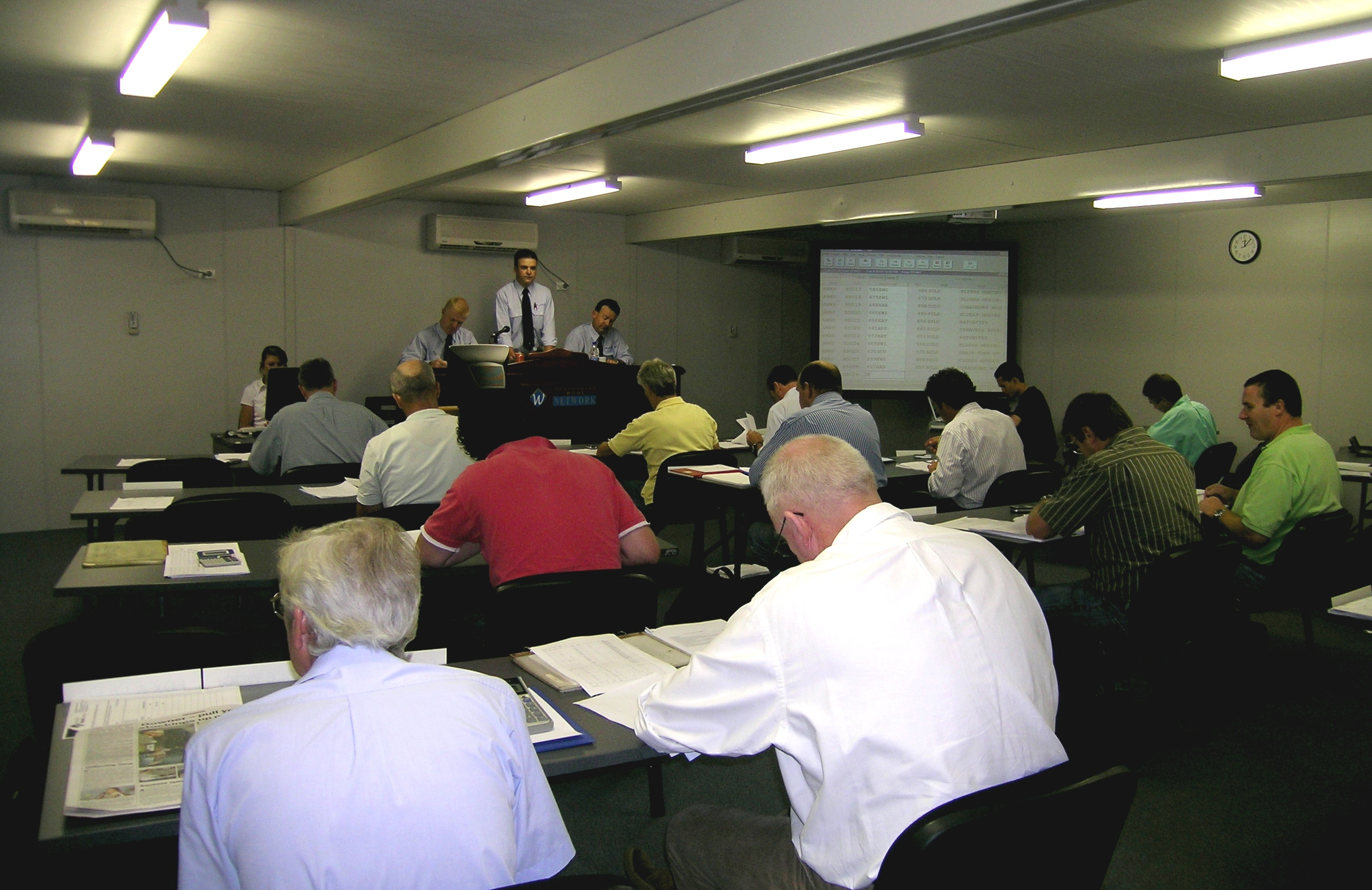
Wool buyers' room at a wool auction, Newcastle, NSW

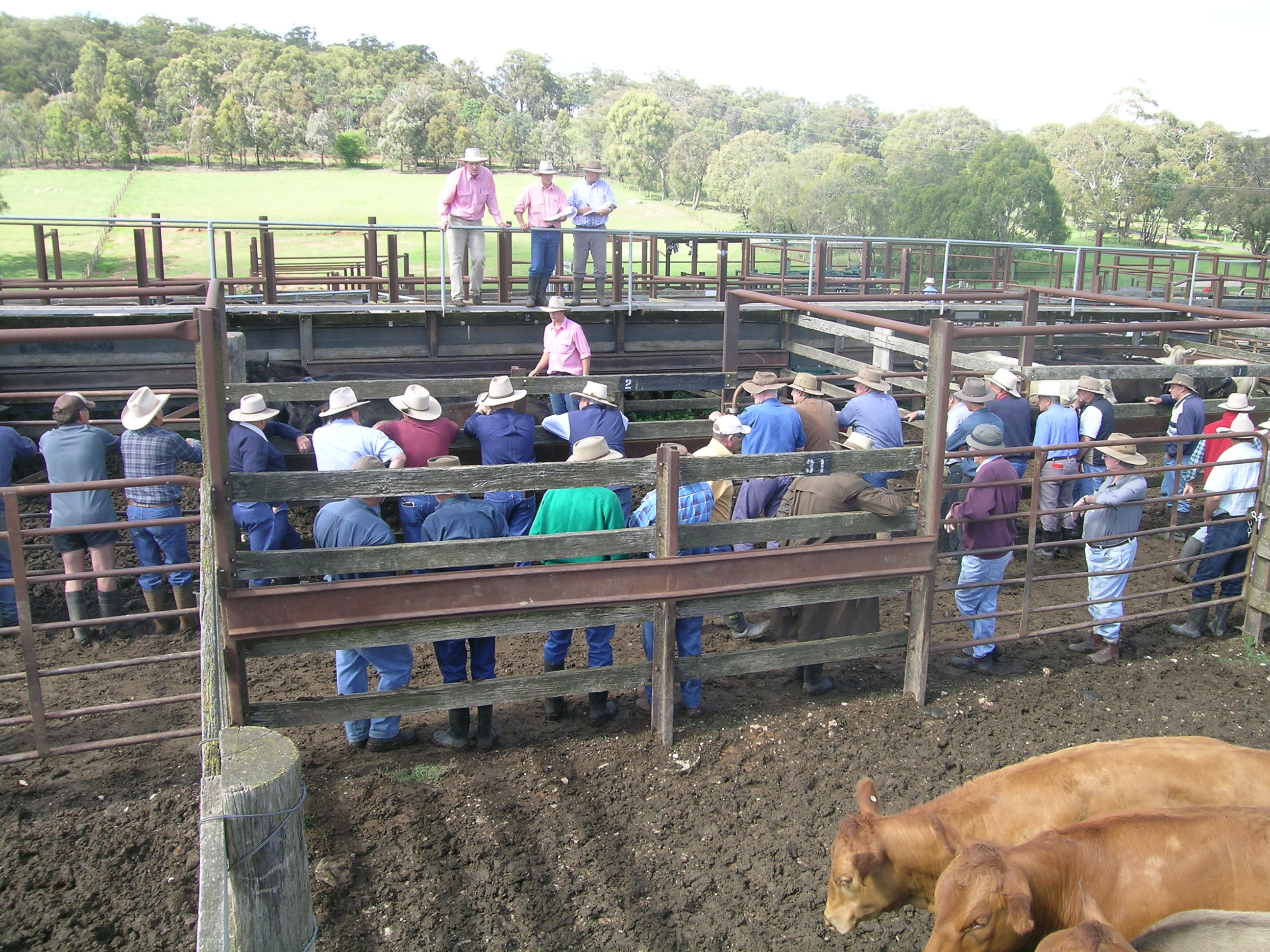
Grass-fed cattle at auction, Walcha, NSW

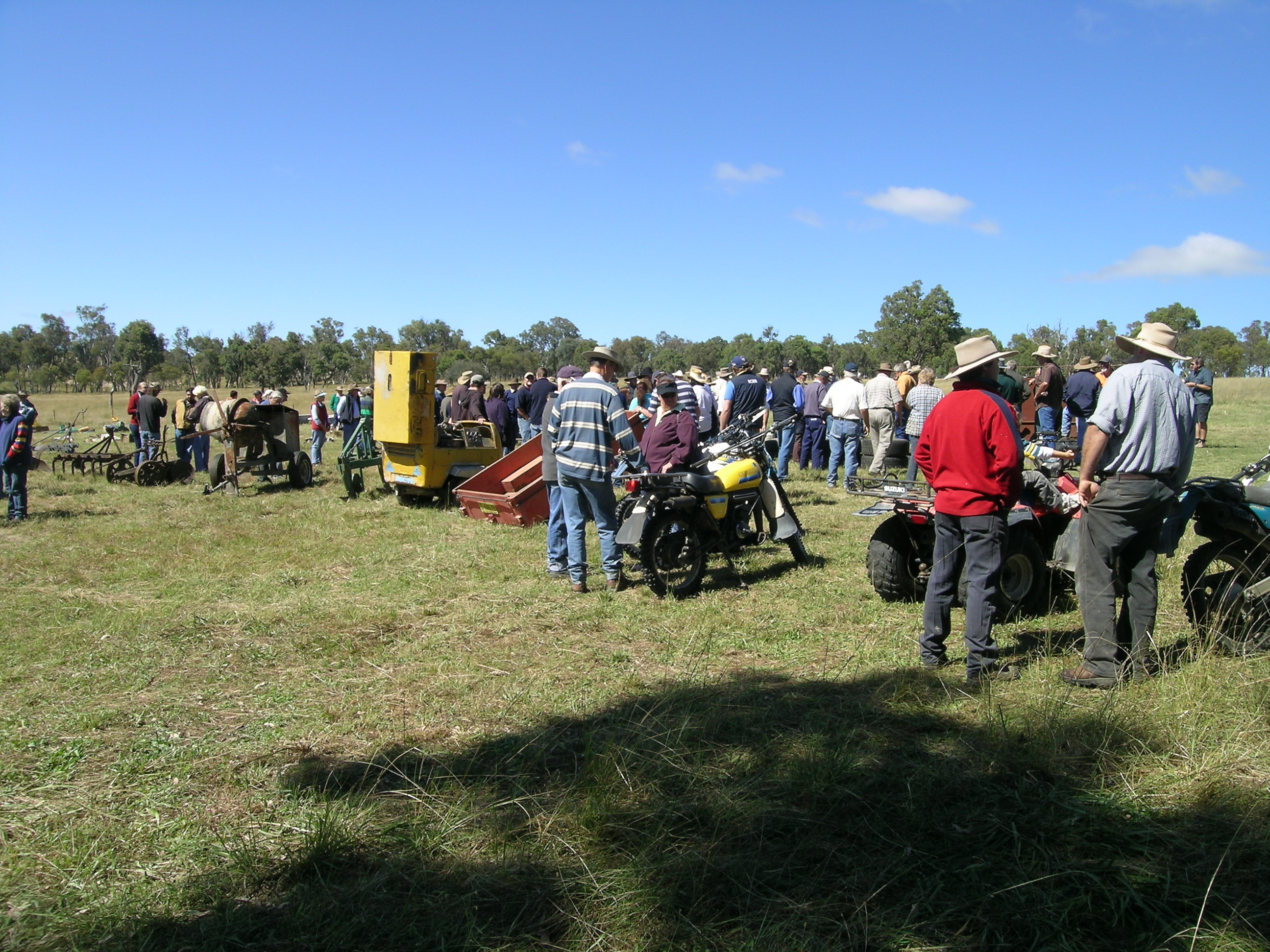
Farm clearing sale, Woolbrook, NSW

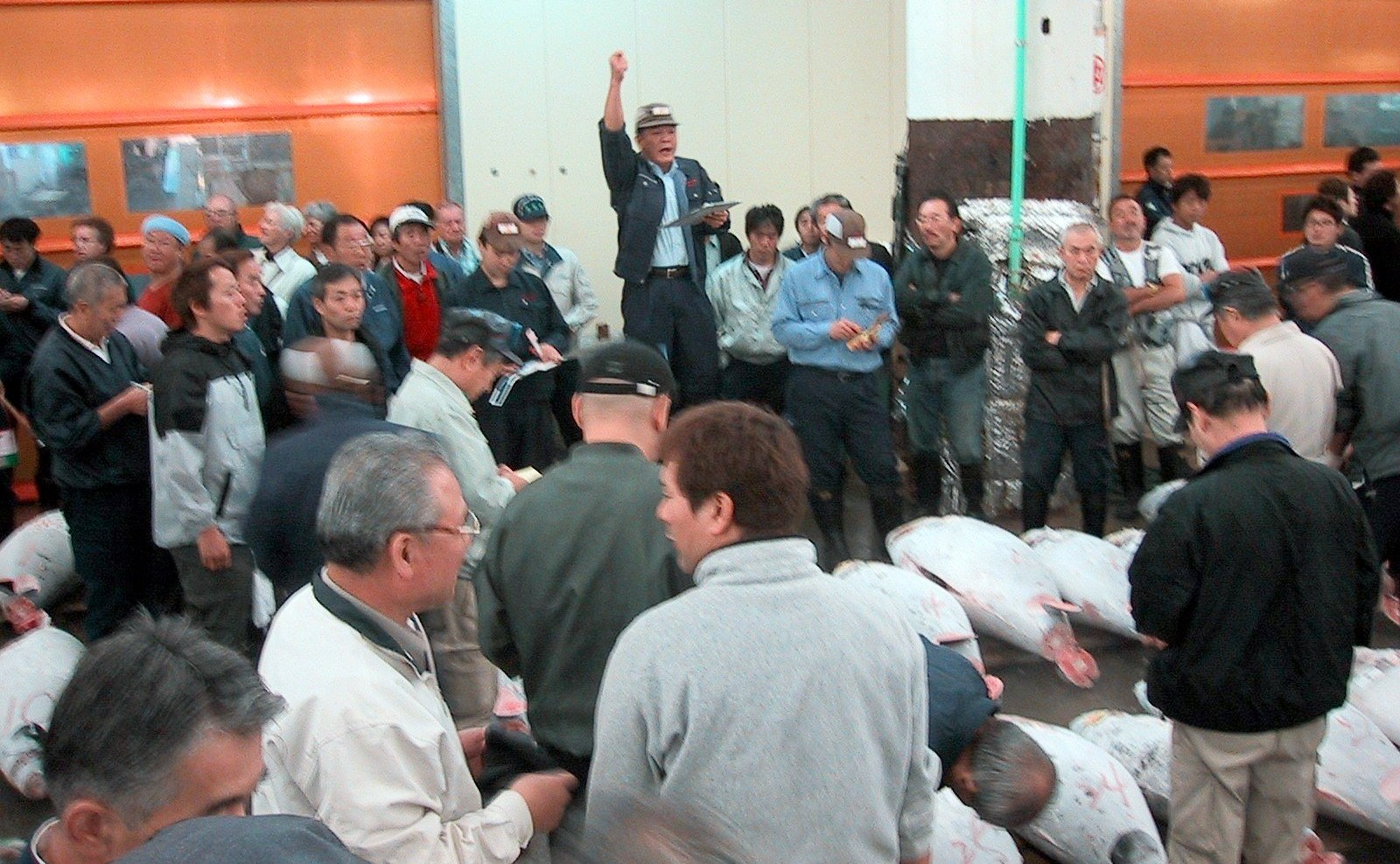
Tuna auction at the Tsukiji fish market in Tokyo

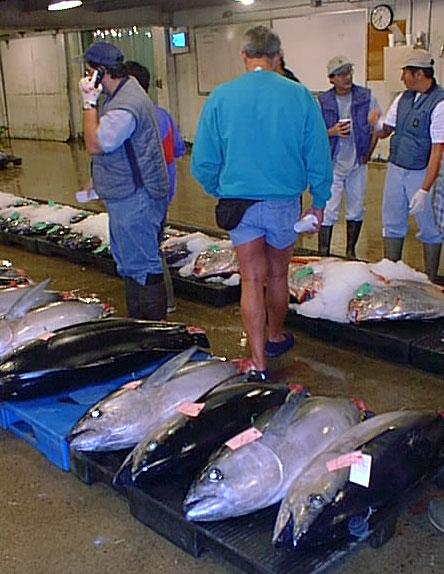
Fish auction in Honolulu, Hawaii

Auctions are used to trade commodities; for example, fish wholesale auctions. In wool auctions, wool is traded in the international market. The wine auction business offers serious collectors an opportunity to gain access to rare bottles and mature vintages, which are not typically available through retail channels. In livestock auctions, sheep, cattle, pigs and other livestock are sold. Sometimes very large numbers of stock are auctioned, such as the regular sales of 50,000 or more sheep during a day in New South Wales. In timber auctions, companies purchase licenses to log on government land. In timber allocation auctions, companies purchase timber directly from the government. In electricity auctions, large-scale generators and distributors of electricity bid on generating contracts. Produce auctions link growers to localized wholesale buyers (buyers who are interested in acquiring large quantities of locally grown produce).

=== Online auctions ===
Online auctions are a form of E-commerce that relies on the advantages of a digital platform's ability to overcome geographical constraints, provide real-time information and reduce transaction costs, bringing greater convenience to people and allowing more people to participate as bidders, as well as being able to view a greater selection of auctions. Websites like eBay provide a potential market of millions of bidders to sellers. Established auction houses, as well as specialist internet auctions, sell many things online, from antiques and collectibles to holidays, air travel, brand new computers, and household equipment. Private electronic markets use combinatorial auction techniques to continuously sell commodities (coal, iron ore, grain, water, etc.) online to a pre-qualified group of buyers (based on price and non-price factors). Furthermore, online auctions facilitate the process for prospective bidders to discover and evaluate items by enabling searches across numerous auctions and employing filters to refine their selections.

On the other hand, an alternative perspective suggests that the format of online auctions could also give rise to collusive conduct and other types of market manipulation, potentially skewing the market and diminishing its efficiency. Firstly, online auctions might enable bidders to obscure their identities, such as utilizing pseudonyms or multiple accounts to maintain anonymity. This concealment could simplify collusion without detection. Secondly, online auctions might ease the implementation of collusive arrangements among bidders. The accessibility of bidding data in online auctions, for instance, allows colluding bidders to monitor each other's bids, guarantee adherence to their agreements, and penalize non-compliance. This enhanced oversight capacity strengthens the stability of collusive agreements.

=== Unique item auctions ===
- Motor vehicle and car auctions – Here one can buy anything from an accident-damaged car to a brand new top-of-the-range model; from a run-of-the-mill family saloon to a rare collector's item.
- Antiques and collectibles auctions give an opportunity for viewing a huge array of items. The sale of collectibles includes items such as stamps, coins, vintage toys & trains, classic cars, and fine art.
- On-site auctions – Sometimes when the stock or assets of a company are simply too vast or too bulky for an auction house to transport to their own premises and store, they will hold an auction within the confines of the bankrupt company itself. Bidders could find themselves bidding for items which are still plugged in, and the great advantage of these auctions taking place on the premises is that they have the opportunity to view the goods as they were being used, and may be able to try them out. Bidders can also avoid the possibility of goods being damaged whilst they are being removed as they can do it or at least supervise the activity.
- Second-hand goods – For the sale of consumer second-hand goods of all kinds, particularly farm (equipment) and house clearances and online auctions.
- Sale of industrial machinery, both surplus or through insolvency.
- Thoroughbred horses, where yearling horses and other bloodstock are auctioned.
- Travel tickets – One example is SJ AB in Sweden auctioning surplus at Tradera (Swedish eBay).
- Holidays – A variety of holidays are available for sale online particularly via eBay. Vacation rentals appear to be the most common. Many holiday auction websites have launched but failed.
- Mystery auction – An auction where bidders bid for boxes or envelopes containing unspecified or underspecified items, usually on the hope that the items will be humorous, interesting, or valuable. In the early days of eBay's popularity, sellers began promoting boxes or packages of random and usually low-value items not worth selling by themselves.
- Some rare CryptoKitties, which are tokens representing virtual cats, have been sold over automated blockchain auctions for more than $200,000.

=== Other contexts ===
- Charity auctions – Used by nonprofits, higher education, and religious institutions as a method to raise funds for a specific mission or cause both through the act of bidding itself, and by encouraging participants to support the cause and make personal donations. Often, these auctions are linked with another charity event like a benefit concert.
- Insurance policies – Auctions are held for second-hand endowment policies. The attraction is that someone else has already paid substantially to set up the policy in the first place, and one will be able (with the help of a financial calculator) to calculate its real worth and decide whether it is worth taking on. Lloyd's, the world's reinsurance market, runs auctions of syndicate capacity for the underwriting.
- Private treaty sales – Occasionally, when looking at an auction catalog some of the items have been withdrawn. Usually, these goods have been sold by 'private treaty'. This means that the goods have already been sold off, usually to a trader or dealer on a private, behind-the-scenes basis before they have had a chance to be offered at the auction sale. These goods are rarely in single lots – photocopiers or fax machines would generally be sold in bulk lots.
- Environmental auctions, in which companies bid for licenses to avoid being required to decrease their environmental impact. These include auctions in emissions trading schemes.

== Bidding strategy ==
=== By the bidders ===
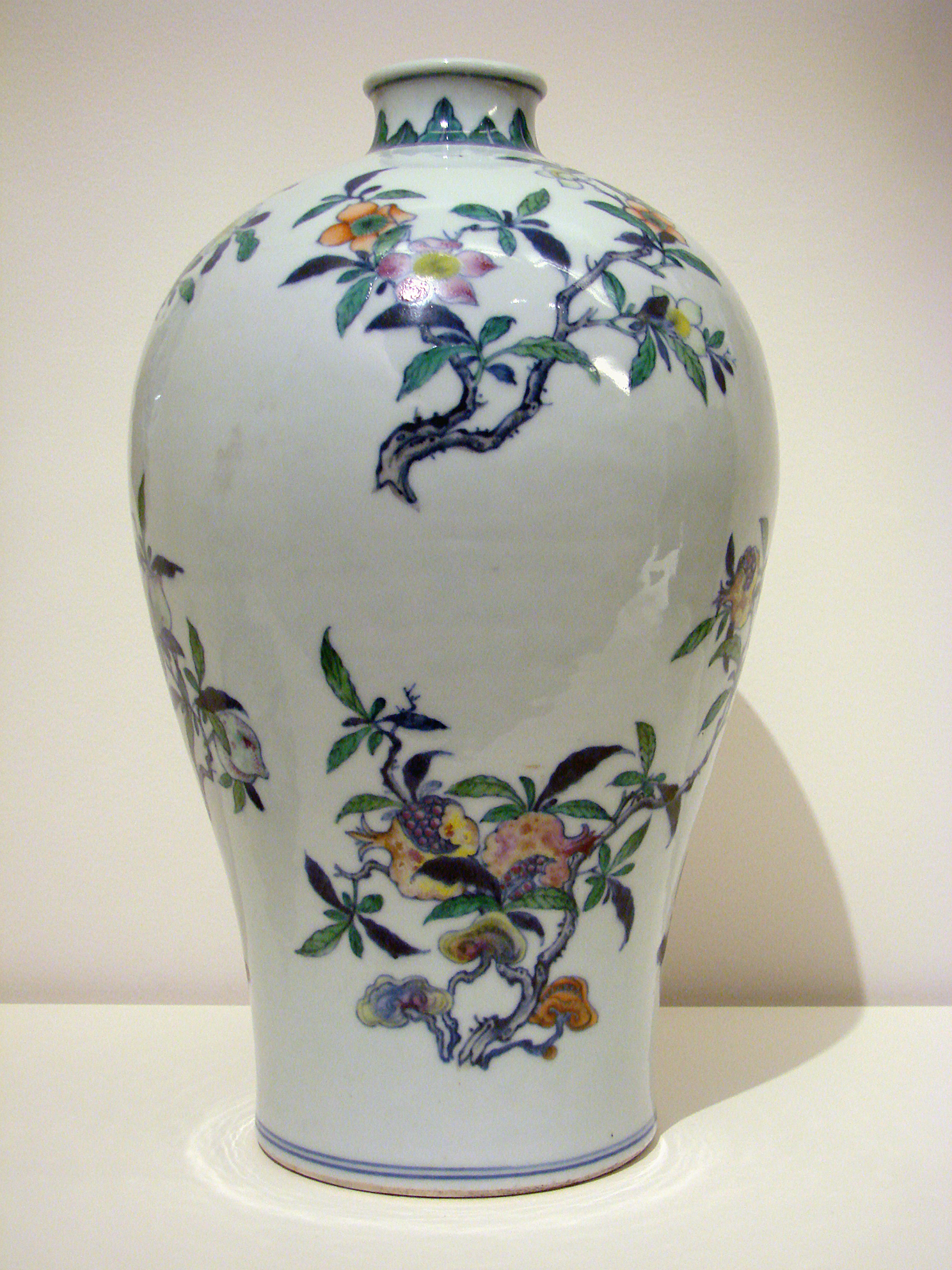
An 18th century Chinese meiping porcelain vase. Porcelain has long been a staple at art sales. In 2005, a 14th-century Chinese porcelain piece was sold by Christie's for £16 million, or US$28 million. It set a world auction record for any ceramic work of art.

Katehakis and Puranam provided the first model for the problem of optimal bidding for a firm that in each period procures items to meet a random demand by participating in a finite sequence of auctions. In this model an item valuation derives from the sale of the acquired items via their demand distribution, sale price, acquisition cost, salvage value and lost sales. They established monotonicity properties for the value function and the optimal dynamic bid policy. They also provided a model for the case in which the buyer must acquire a fixed number of items either at a fixed buy-it-now price in the open market or by participating in a sequence of auctions. The objective of the buyer is to minimize their expected total cost for acquiring the fixed number of items.

During an auction, the seller might possess more comprehensive knowledge regarding the item on offer compared to the buyer, creating an information asymmetry. This lack of information could lead the bidder to overvalue the item and consequently pay a higher price, resulting in the winner's curse. Nevertheless, bidders may also choose to employ bid shading as a strategy to circumvent this predicament. Bid shading is placing a bid which is below the bidder's actual value for the item. Such a strategy risks losing the auction but has the possibility of winning at a low price. Bid shading can also be a strategy to avoid the winner's curse. In either case, the allocation of resources may be inefficient, as the product will not ultimately be acquired by the individual who values it the most. Instead, it will go to the person who either overvalues it the most or effectively employs bid shading.

Auction cancellation hunters bid minimal amounts on multiple auctions and expect them to be cancelled. If an auction is cancelled by the seller, they will claim for damages in the amount of the difference between the maximum bid at the time of the auction cancellation and the price of a replacement purchase of the offered item in the auction, when the market is in equilibrium, even if the seller has not sold any of the items, the shadow of bidding still exists. This is the self-protection instinct of the auction market. In order to make this transaction fairer. Auction sniping is the practice of placing a bid at the last moment of the auction. According to the analysis of auction data from eBay, in general, experienced bidders are more likely to snipe in auctions, and those who snipe in auctions are more likely to win. Jump bidding is an aggressive tactic of increasing every bid by high amounts. Calor licitantis is also known as "auction fever" and describes the irrational behavior of bidders at auctions. Suicide bidding is practice in reverse auctions, whereby a bidder submits a bid, which ends up in a loss for this bidder.

==== Collusion ====
Whenever bidders at an auction are aware of the identity of the other bidders there is a risk that they will form a "ring" or "pool" and thus manipulate the auction result, a practice known as collusion or more specially bid-rigging. By agreeing to bid only against outsiders, never against members of the "ring", competition becomes weaker, which may dramatically affect the final price level. After the end of the official auction, an unofficial auction may take place among the "ring" members. The difference in price between the two auctions could then be split among the members. This form of a ring was used as a central plot device in the opening episode of the 1979 British television series The House of Caradus, 'For Love or Money', uncovered by Helena Caradus on her return from Paris.

In the UK, this auction practice is illegal. It jeopardizes competition on the auction and can demotivate other bidders from participating. It robs the seller of the true value of their good and reduces the auctioneer's commission.

Beyond explicit collusion, a tacit coordination of bidders to keep bids low is at least theoretically possible. In case of spectrum auctions, the Federal Communications Commission (FCC) experimented with precautions restricting visibility of bids, limiting the number of bids, click-box bidding, and anonymous bidding in order to prevent bidders from signalling bidding information by embedding it into digits of the bids. Actions within the auction mechanism serve as a communication channel for collusive behavior, once no other channels are legal.

=== By the auctioneer ===
==== Chandelier or rafter bidding ====
This is the practice, especially by high-end art auctioneers, of raising false bids at crucial times in the bidding in order to create the appearance of greater demand or to extend bidding momentum for a work on offer. To call out these nonexistent bids auctioneers might fix their gaze at a point in the auction room that is difficult for the audience to pin down. The practice is frowned upon in the industry. In the United States, chandelier bidding is not illegal. In fact, an auctioneer may bid up the price of an item to the reserve price, which is a threshold below which the consignor may refuse to sell the item. However, the auction house is required to disclose this information.

In the United Kingdom this practice is legal on property auctions up to but not including the reserve price, and is also known as off-the-wall bidding.

==== Collusion involving auctioneer ====
A ring can also be used to increase the price of an auction lot, in which the owner of the object being auctioned may increase competition by taking part in the bidding themself, but drop out of the bidding just before the final bid. This form of a ring was used as a central plot device in an episode of the British television series Lovejoy (series 4, episode 3), in which the price of a watercolour by the (fictional) Jessie Webb is inflated so that others by the same artist could be sold for more than their purchase price. In an English auction, a dummy bid is a bid made by a dummy bidder acting in collusion with the auctioneer or vendor, designed to deceive genuine bidders into paying more. In a first-price auction, a dummy bid is an unfavourable bid designed so as not to become the winning bid. (The bidder does not want to win this auction, but they want to make sure to be invited to the next auction).

In Britain and many other countries, rings and other forms of bidding on one's own object are illegal. In Australia, a dummy bid or also a shill is a criminal offence, but a vendor bid or a co-owner bid below the reserve price is permitted if clearly declared as such by the auctioneer. These are all official legal terms in Australia but may have other meanings elsewhere. A co-owner is one of two or several owners (who disagree among themselves). In Sweden and many other countries, there are no legal restrictions, but it will severely hurt the reputation of an auction house that knowingly permits any other bids except genuine bids. If the reserve is not reached this should be clearly declared. In South Africa, auctioneers can use their staff or any bidder to raise the price as long as it is disclosed before the auction sale. Rael Levitt's companies The Auction Alliance controversy focused on vendor bidding and led to its downfall in 2012.

==== Suggested opening bid (SOB) ====
There will usually be an estimate of what price the lot will fetch. In an ascending open auction, it is considered important to get at least a 50-percent increase in the bids from start to finish. To accomplish this, the auctioneer must start the auction by announcing a suggested opening bid (SOB) that is low enough to be immediately accepted by one of the bidders. Once there is an opening bid, there will quickly be several other, higher bids submitted. Experienced auctioneers will often select an SOB that is about 45 percent of the (lowest) estimate. Thus there is a certain margin of safety to ensure that there will indeed be a lively auction with many bids submitted. Several observations indicate that the lower the SOB, the higher the final winning bid. This is due to the increase in the number of bidders attracted by the low SOB.

A chi-squared distribution shows many low bids but few high bids. Bids "show up together"; without several low bids there will not be any high bids.

Another approach to choosing a SOB: The auctioneer may achieve good success by asking the expected final sales price for the item, as this method suggests to the potential buyers the item's particular value. For instance, an auctioneer is about to sell a $1,000 car at a sale. Instead of asking $100, hoping to entice wide interest, the auctioneer may suggest an opening bid of $1,000; although the first bidder may begin bidding at a mere $100, the final bid may more likely approach $1,000.

== Terminology ==
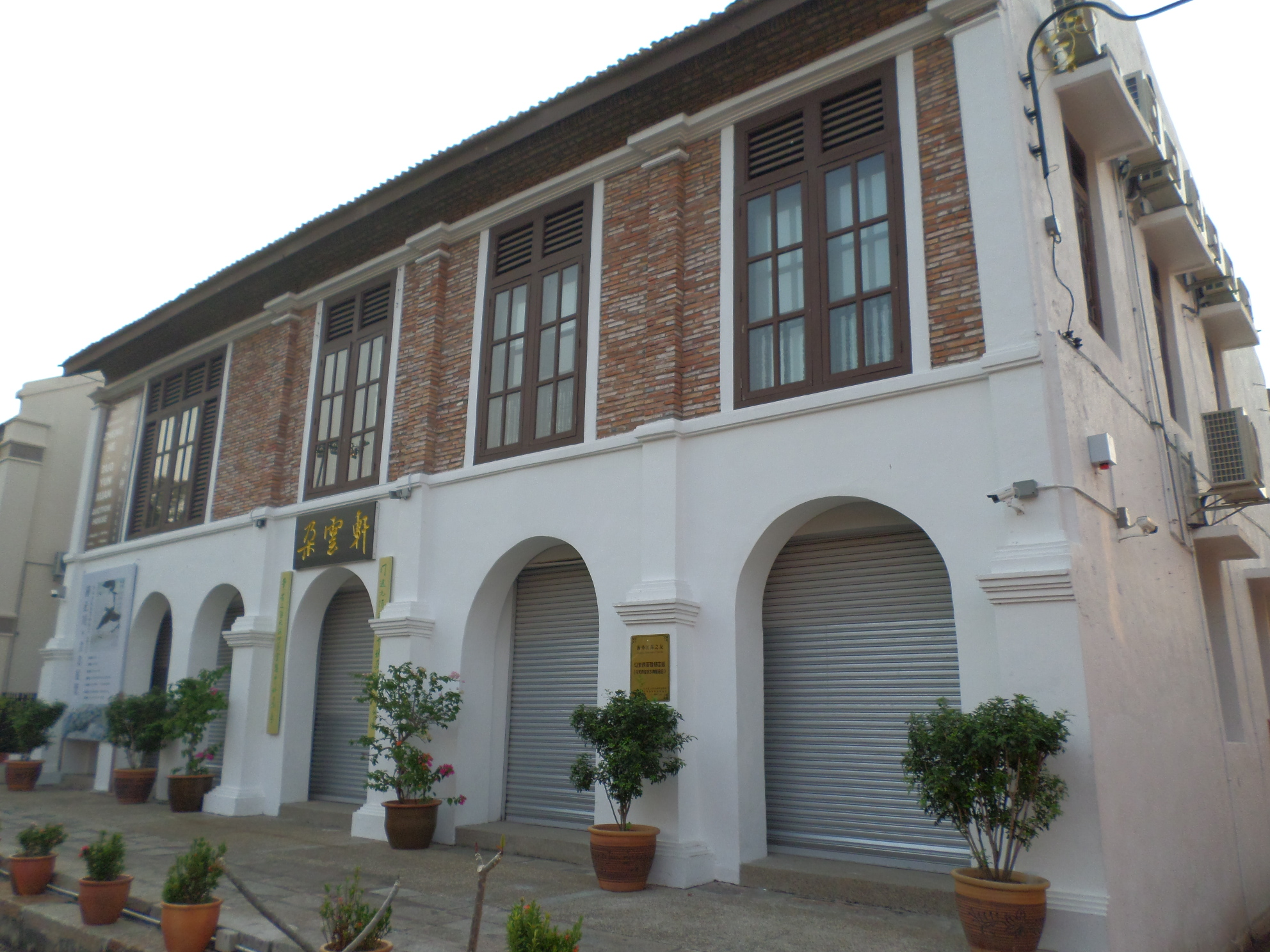
Duo Yun Xuan auction house in Malacca, Malaysia

- Absentee bids – this is when a prospective buyer places a bid on an item without attending the sale. This is sometimes referred to instead as a commission bid because the auctioneer is effectively commissioned to enter bids on the potential buyer's behalf. The bid is submitted prior to the auction by whatever means the auctioneer has stipulated.
- Appraisal – an estimate of an item's worth, usually performed by an expert in that particular field.
- Auction block – a raised platform on which the auctioneer shows the items to be auctioned; it can also be slang for the auction itself.
- Auction chant – a rhythmic repetition of numbers and "filler words" spoken by an auctioneer in the process of conducting an auction.
- Auction fever – an emotional state elicited in the course of one or more auctions that causes a bidder to deviate from an initially chosen bidding strategy.
- Auction house – the company operating the auction (i.e., establishing the date and time of the auction, the auction rules, determining which items are to be included in the auction, registering bidders, taking payments, and delivering the goods to the winning bidders).
- Auctioneer – the person conducting the actual auction. They announce the rules of the auction and the items being auctioned, call and acknowledge bids made, and announce the winner.
  - The auctioneer can sometimes just be the owner of the business, in which case they may hire a bid caller/s to announce the rules and call bids.
  - The auctioneer may operate their own auction house (and thus perform the duties of both auctioneer and auction house), or work for another house.
  - Auctioneers are frequently regulated by governmental entities, and in those jurisdictions must meet certain criteria to be licensed (be of a certain age, have no disqualifying criminal record, attend auction school, pass an examination, and pay a licensing fee).
  - Auctioneers may or may not (depending on the laws of the jurisdiction and the policies of the auction house) bid for their own account, or if they do, must disclose this to bidders at the auction; similar rules may apply for employees of the auctioneer or the auction house.
- Bidding – the act of participating in an auction by offering to purchase an item for sale.
- Bid Construction Problem (BCP) – also known as the Bid Generation Problem (BGP), BCP is a NP-hard combinatorial problem addressed and solved by the bidder to determine the bid packages to bid on and their corresponding bidding prices.
- Buyer's premium – a fee paid by the buyer to the auction house; it is typically calculated as a percentage of the winning bid and added to it. Depending on the jurisdiction, the buyer's premium, in addition to the sales price, may be subject to VAT or sales tax.
- Buyout price – a price that, if accepted by a bidder, immediately ends the auction and awards the item to them (an example is eBay's "Buy It Now" feature).
- Choice – a form of bidding whereby a number of identical or similar items are bid at a single price for each item.
- Clearance rate – the percentage of items that sell over the course of the auction.
- Commission – a fee paid by a consignor/seller to the auction house; it is typically calculated as a percentage of the winning bid and deducted from the gross proceeds due to the consignor/seller.
- Consignee and consignor – as pertaining to auctions, the consignor (also called the seller, and in some contexts the vendor) is the person owning the item to be auctioned or the owner's representative, while the consignee is the auction house. The consignor maintains title until such time that an item is purchased by a bidder and the bidder pays the auction house.
- Dummy bid (a/k/a "ghost bid") – a false bid, made by someone in collusion with the seller or auctioneer, designed to create a sense of increased interest in the item (and, thus, increased bids). Often only permitted if the current high bid is below the reserve (q.v.)
- Dynamic closing – a mechanism used to prevent auction sniping, by which the closing time is extended for a small period to allow other bidders to increase their bids.
- eBidding – electronic bidding, whereby a person may make a bid without being physically present at an auction (or where the entire auction is taking place on the Internet).
- Earnest money deposit (a/k/a "caution money deposit" or "registration deposit") – a payment that must be made by prospective bidders ahead of time in order to participate in an auction.
  - The purpose of this deposit is to deter non-serious bidders from attending the auction; by requiring the deposit, only bidders with a genuine interest in the items being sold will participate.
  - This type of deposit is most often used in auctions involving high-value goods (such as real estate).
  - The winning bidder has their earnest money applied toward the final selling price; the non-winners have theirs refunded to them.
- Escrow – an arrangement in which the winning bidder pays the amount of their bid to a third party, who in turn releases the funds to the seller under agreed-upon terms.
- Estimate - auction houses typically give an estimate (or guide price), often a range, for lots. This is a rather conservative indication of the price they expect the lot to reach at auction, decided by the auction house, perhaps after consulting outside experts. If an auction is going well, most lots will achieve a price near the top of the estimate, or some 20 or 30% over it. But some lots may fetch double or more the estimate, for various reasons; others much less than the lower end of the estimate.
- Hammer price – the nominal price at which a lot is sold; the buyer, and often the seller, may have to pay additional fees, "premiums", and taxes on top of this amount.

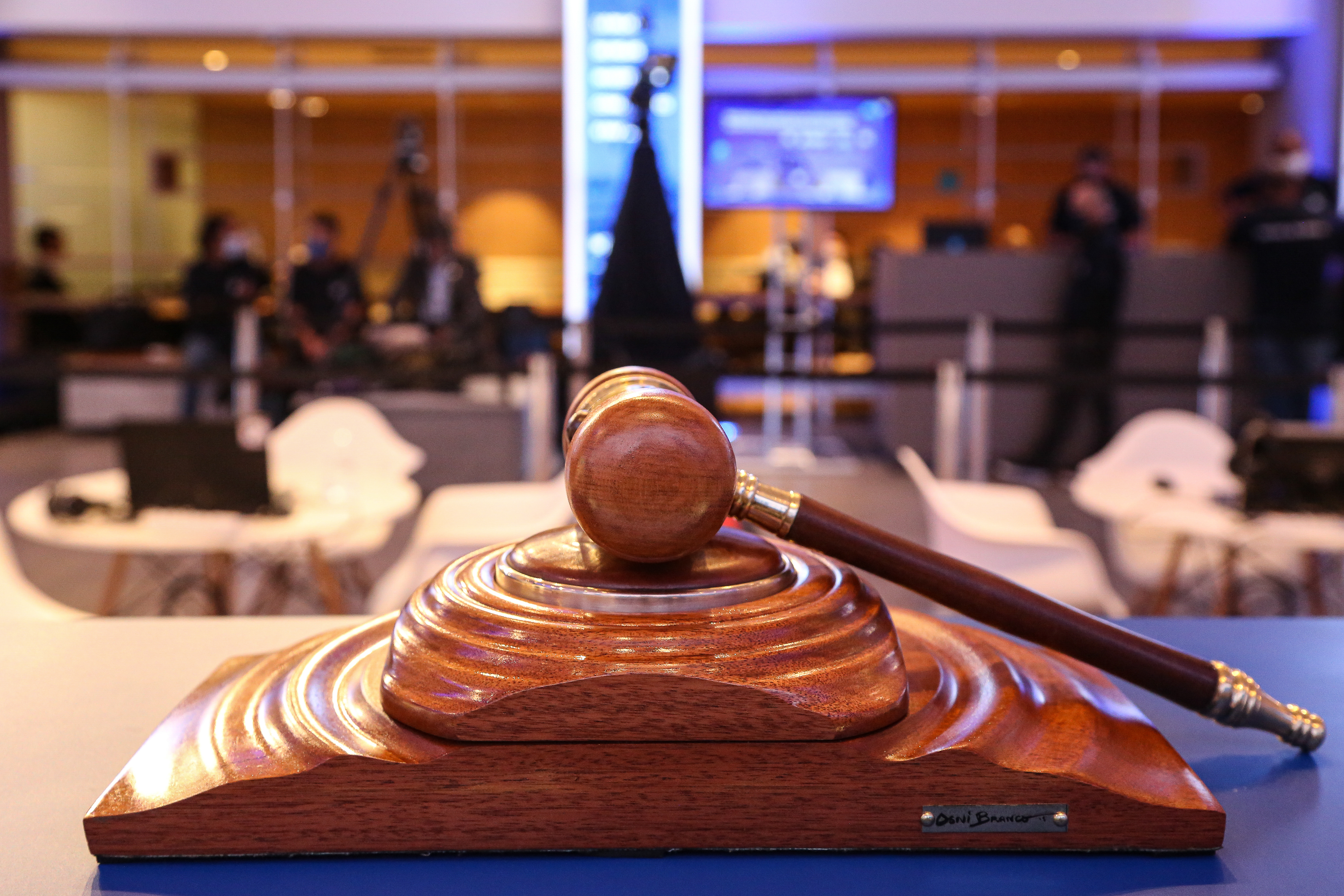
Hammer used in auctions

- Increment – a minimum amount by which a new bid must exceed the previous bid. An auctioneer may decrease the increment when it appears that bidding on an item may stop, so as to get a higher hammer price. Alternatively, a participant may offer a bid at a smaller increment, which the auctioneer has the discretion to accept or reject.
- Thumb Auction - Olden Auction type where bid were hidden and the bidders used to tell auctioneer their bibs by placing their fingers under a cloth and touch the fingers with an dedicated amount.
- Lot – either a single item being sold, or a group of items (which may or may not be similar or identical, such as a "job lot" of manufactured goods) that are bid on as one unit.
  - If the lot is for a group of items, the price paid is for the entire lot and the winning bidder must take all the items sold.
  - Variants on a group lot bid include "choice" and "times the money" (see definitions for each).
    - Example: An auction has five bath fragrance gift baskets where bidding is "lot", and the hammer price is $5. The winner must pay $5 (as the price is for the whole lot) and must take all five baskets.
- Maiden bid – a single bid which wins the lot being offered for sale, with no other bids made.
- Minimum bid – the smallest opening bid that will be accepted.
  - A minimum bid can be as little as $0.01 (one cent) depending on the auction.
  - If no one bids at the initial minimum bid, the auctioneer may lower the minimum bid so as to create interest in the item.
  - The minimum bid differs from a reserve price (see definition), in that the auctioneer sets the minimum bid, while the seller sets the reserve price (if desired).
- Modern Method Of Auction - most of these auctions happen online instead of in auction rooms. A real estate property is typically offered for a set period (i.e. 14-21 days) and the highest bid before the deadline wins.
- "New money" – a new bidder, joining bidding for an item after others have bid against each other.
- No reserve auction (a/k/a "absolute auction") – an auction in which there is no minimum acceptable price; so long as the winning bid is at least the minimum bid, the seller must honor the sale.
- Outbid – to bid higher than another bidder.
- Opening bid – the first bid placed on a particular lot. The opening bid must be at least the minimum bid, but may be higher (e.g., a bidder may shout out a considerably larger bid than minimum, to discourage other bidders from bidding).
- Paddle – a numbered instrument used to place a bid
- Protecting a market – when a dealer places a bid on behalf of an artist they represent or otherwise have a financial interest in ensuring a high price. Artists represented by major galleries typically expect this kind of protection from their dealers.
- Proxy bid (also called an absentee bid) – a bid placed by an authorized representative of a bidder who is not physically present at the auction.
  - Proxy bids are common in auctions of high-end items, such as art sales (where the proxy represents either a private bidder who does not want to be disclosed to the public, or a museum bidding on a particular item for its collection).
  - If the proxy is outbid on an item during the auction, the proxy (depending on the instructions of the bidder) may either increase the bid (up to a set amount established by the bidder) or be required to drop out of the bidding for that item.
  - A proxy may also be limited by the bidder in the total amount to spend on items in a multi-item auction.
- Relisting – re-selling an item that has already been sold at auction, but where the buyer did not take possession of the item (for example, in a real estate auction, the buyer did not provide payment by the closing date).
- Reserve (price) – a minimum acceptable price established by the seller prior to the auction, which may or may not be disclosed to the bidders.
  - If the winning bid is below the reserve price, the seller has the right to reject the bid and withdraw the item or items being auctioned.
  - The reserve price differs from a minimum bid (see definition), in that the seller sets the reserve price (if desired), while the auctioneer sets the minimum bid.
- Sealed bid – a submitted bid whose value is unknown to competitors.
- Sniping – the act of placing a bid just before the end of a timed auction, thus giving other bidders no time to enter new bids.
- Soft close – When a bidder places a bid in the last set amount of minutes and the auction is automatically extended for a set period of time. Soft closes prevent sniping.
- Specialist – on-staff trained professionals, often specialising in specific objects (for example, porcelain) who put together the auction.
- The "three Ds" (death, divorce, or debt) – sometimes a reason for an item to be sold at an auction.
- Vendor bid – a bid by the person selling the item. The bid is sometimes a dummy bid (see definition) but not always.
- White glove sale – an auction in which every single lot is sold.

== JEL classification ==
The Journal of Economic Literature (JEL) classification code for auctions is D44.

== See also ==
- Auction chant
- Auction house
- Auction Network
- Auction school
- Auction software
- Auction theory
- Auctions in Monopoly game
- Foreclosure
- Game theory
- Offer and acceptance
- Online auction
- Online travel auction
- Request for tender
- Silent trade
