= Multi-attribute auction =

A multi-attribute auction is a type of auction in which the bids have multiple parts. Multi-attribute auctions allow agents to sell and purchase goods and services, taking into account more attributes than just price (e.g. service time, tolerances, qualities, etc.).

== History ==
The earliest research paper about a multi-attribute auction appeared in a 1993 paper by Yeon-Koo Che. In 1997, they were discussed in the context of long-term electricity contracts.

== Attributes ==
The structural elements of a bid are called designated attributes. Attributes may be verifiable, unverifiable, or auctioneer-provided. If bids include a single quality, such as price, the auction is referred to as a single-attribute auction. Generally, bids are prices in English auctions, and confirmations in Dutch and Japanese auctions. In Brazilian auctions, they refer to the numbers of units being traded.

A scoring, or utility function, is essential for multi-attribute auctions, as it calculates a single number from multiple attributes, making bids that vary in multiple ways comparable. This scoring function is announced by the auctioneer to the bidders before the start of the auction.

== See also ==
- Multi-attribute global inference of quality
- Multi-attribute utility
