= Multiunit auction =

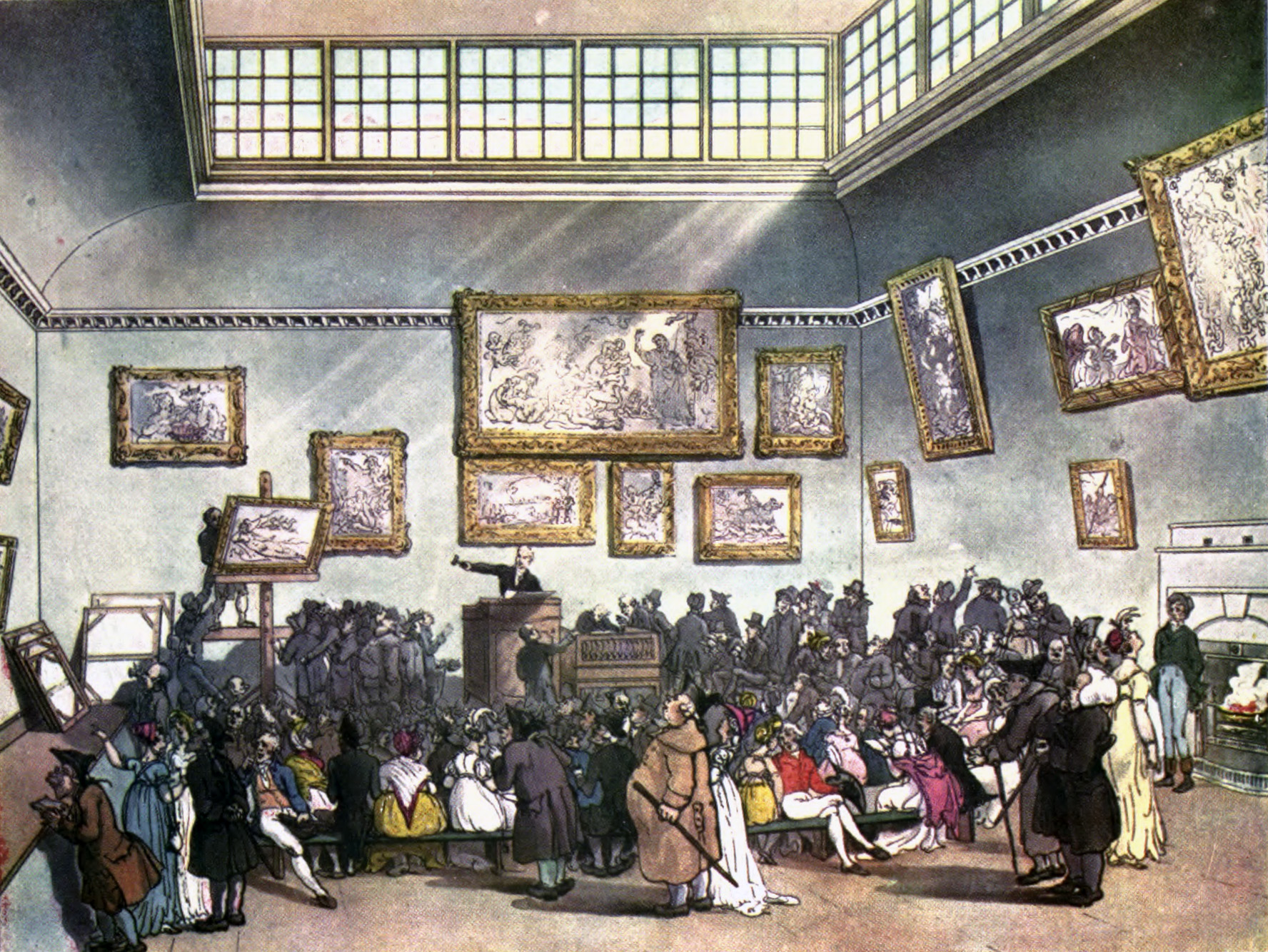
Auction Room, Christie's

A multiunit auction is an auction in which several homogeneous items are sold. The units can be sold each at the same price (a uniform price auction) or at different prices (a discriminatory price auction).

== Uniform price auction ==
A uniform price auction otherwise known as a "clearing price auction", pay-as-clear or marginal price auction, "marginal price system" (MPS), is a multiunit auction in which a fixed number of identical units of a homogenous commodity are sold for the same price. Each bidder in the auction may submit (possibly multiple) bids, designating both the number of units desired and the price he/she is willing to pay per unit.

Typically these bids are sealed, not revealed to the other buyers until the auction closes. The auctioneer then serves the highest bidder first, giving them the number of units requested, then the second-highest bidder and so forth until the supply of the commodity is exhausted. All bidders then pay a per unit price equal to the lowest winning bid (the lowest bid out of the buyers who actually received one or more units of the commodity) - regardless of their actual bid. Some variations of this auction have the winners paying the highest losing bid rather than the lowest winning bid.

A uniform price auction may be utilised to aggregate a number of units offered by more than one seller to multiple buyers. This style of auction, sometimes referred to as a call market or double auction, shares the characteristics of an open market mechanism in which all buyers and all sellers interested in trading a homogenous commodity may participate simultaneously. The clearing price mechanism is often utilised in a market context in order to establish a benchmark price index for that market in question. Examples include government bond auctions, electricity market auctions and compliance certificate markets.

In theory, the uniform-price auction provides an incentive for bidders to bid insincerely unless each bidder has demand for only a single unit. For multiple-unit demand, bidders have an incentive to shade their bids for units other than their first because those bids may influence the price the bidder pays. This demand reduction results in an inefficient equilibrium.

A variation that preserves the incentive to bid truthfully is the Vickrey-Clark-Groves auction.

== Discriminatory price auction ==
In a discriminatory price auction (or pay-as-bid auction, PAB), multiple homogeneous items are sold at different prices. An example is the auction system at the Dutch Flower Auctions, where a lot is allocated to (potentially) multiple buyers in different bidding rounds. To speed up this process, the initial auction price for any subsequent bidding round is set just slightly higher than the previous winning bid (around 15-20 cents, or 15-30% on average).

== Yankee auction ==
Yankee auction is a special case of multiunit auction. OnSale.com has developed Yankee auction as its trademark in the 1990s. A Yankee auction is a single-attribute multiunit auction running like a Dutch auction, where the bids are the portions of a total amount of identical units. The total amount of auctioned items is firm in a Yankee auction unlike a Brazilian auction. The portions of the total amount, bidders can bid, are limited to lower numbers than the total amount. Therefore, only a portion of the total amount will be traded for the best price and the rest to the suboptimal prices like in the discriminatory price auction.

== See also ==
- Combinatorial auction, an auction of bundle(s) of multiple heterogeneous items
