= Auctions in ancient Greece =

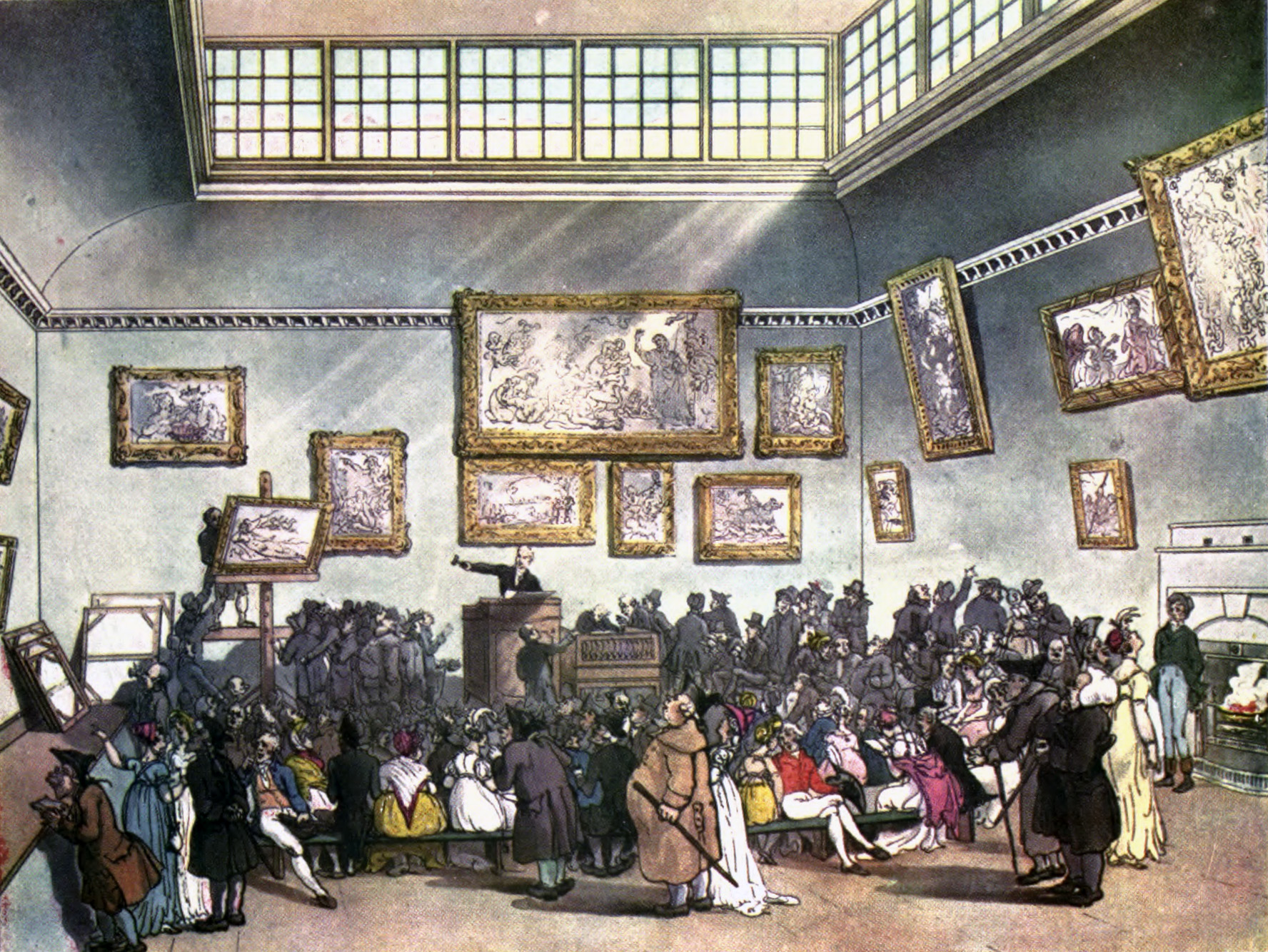
Microcosm of London Plate 006 -Auction Room, Christie’s

Auctions in ancient Greece were events in which goods were sold through an open bidding process. Participants competed by offering higher bids, with the highest bidder ultimately acquiring the goods. Two primary categories of auctions existed: public auctions, which involved the sale of state-owned goods, and private auctions, which involved the sale of goods owned by individuals, with the seller's identity often kept confidential. Items commonly auctioned included land, rights to collect taxes, enslaved individuals, confiscated goods, and inheritances.

== Private and public auctions ==
There were two types of auctions in Ancient Greece. In a public auction, goods belonging to the government were sold and the identity of the seller was made public. These auctions were also organized by public officials. Sometimes these officials were more closely affiliated to the military, and sometimes they were civil authorities. Public auctions were often used as a quick and easy way to raise funds to balance the government's budget. Usually public auctions were used to satisfy normal recurring expenditures as opposed to extraordinary expenses like wars, public works projects, or food shortages. Public auctions were also useful as a mechanism to collect taxes. In Athens, in the place of an administrative arm with the express purpose of collecting taxes, there was a system of Tax farming via public auction. The tax farmers (telonai) would collect the taxes instead of government officials. Public auctions were also used a means of punishment by the government. If someone misused or misappropriated public property, sometimes some or all of their goods would be seized and by the government and sold through public auction. Public auctions were also used as a political tool to curry or check power within the polis, especially during the reign of a tyrant. Public auctions could be used to dominate and degrade those who opposed the current regime and reward those who supported it.

In a private auction, the identity of the seller was not made public and the goods on sale belonged to private individuals. Private auctions were an important aspect of estate management as inheritances were commonly sold at private auctions. Private auctions also contributed to the status of buyer within Greek society and as the quality of goods from an estate could contribute to the esteem of the buyer.

== Auction procedure ==
Anyone who desired to sell at an auction would need to speak to the public offerer about the matter. The auction would then be announced both in writing and orally through the keryx. Unlike in Italy, money changers, or argentarii were not used in Greece. However, banks became involved with the process between the second and third century BCE.

== Goods commonly sold at auction ==
Public auctions often sold rights to unpaid loans, public lands and other public goods, goods seized from conquered enemies, confiscated goods from those who owed the government taxes, and goods from exiles and convicts and exiles. The collection of taxes was also often sold through public auction. Prisoners of war were also sold as slaves through public auction. At private auctions, goods like land, inheritance, crops, houses, slaves, and livestock were often sold. Private auctions were also used as a means to pass wealth down through a legacy. Goods sold at public auctions included food, spices, wool and books.
