= Auction software =

Application software technology for auctions

Auction software is application software, that can either be deployed on a desktop, on a web server or as a smart contract on a blockchain virtual machine. This software is used by auctioneers and participants of online auctions such as eBay. Smart contracts replace an auctioneer's server, if the auctioneer is not trusted.

Online Auction companies have opened up their applications to third-party application developers to extend the capabilities and increase revenue. API interfaces were developed using XML which enable third-party developers to build applications that use the back-end of the online auction.

== Economic experiments ==
Economists use special software to study human behavior in auctions by running auctions in a lab. There are diverse software tools for laboratory economic experiments, which allow fast programming of auctions. For instance, z-Tree programming language allows programming an experimental double auction in less than a day. This practise led to appearance of multiple scientific publications exposing results for generalized second price auctions, Dutch auctions, all-pay auctions and other auction types.

== Auction websites ==
Auction websites reside in three categories according to the business model. These are B2B (Business to Business), B2C (Business to Customer), and C2C (Customer to Customer). eBay website serves all three business models. SAP Ariba website is dedicated to B2B. Ariba patented its auction software technology and won a case worth over $6M against Emptoris Inc. in 2009.

== Smart-contract based auction ==
Blockchains with smart contract like Ethereum functionality allow definition, execution and enforcement of auctions between untrusted parties without the involvement of a trusted third party. A smart contract is code that is executed on top of the blockchain. Blockchain auction ensure transparency and prevent cheating by auctioneers and collusion by bidders.

== Auction sniping software ==
Auction sniping can be done by software on the bidder's computer, or by an online sniping service. eBay Germany banned automated sniping services in 2002, but the ban was declared illegal by Berlin's County Court, and revoked.

== General game playing ==
General game playing was also proposed for agents in the sourcing process within supply chain management thereunder price negotiation in online auctions from 2003 on. Hereby, an auction can be described in a game description language.
