= French auction =

Public auction pricing method

A French auction (Offre à Prix Minimal, formerly Mise en Vente) is a multiple-price auction used for pricing initial public offerings.

In this offering, the firm announces a minimum (reserve) price. Investors place sealed bids for quantity and price. When the bids are in, the firm negotiates a minimum and maximum price with the market regulator (the Société des Bourses Françaises, or SBF).

Any bid above the maximum price is eliminated. The bidders who bid between the minimum and maximum price are awarded shares on a pro rata basis, each paying the minimum price.

If demand for the stock is too high, then the IPO may be changed to fixed-price offering.

== See also ==
- Book building
