= Multi-attribute global inference of quality =

Multi-attribute global inference of quality (MAGIQ) is a multi-criteria decision analysis technique. MAGIQ is based on a hierarchical decomposition of comparison attributes and rating assignment using rank order centroids.

== Description ==
The MAGIQ technique is used to assign a single, overall measure of quality to each member of a set of systems where each system has an arbitrary number of comparison attributes. The MAGIQ technique has features similar to the analytic hierarchy process and the simple multi-attribute rating technique exploiting ranks (SMARTER) technique. The MAGIQ technique was first published by James D. McCaffrey. The MAGIQ process begins with an evaluator determining which system attributes are to be used as the basis for system comparison. These attributes are ranked by importance to the particular problem domain, and the ranks are converted to ratings using rank order centroids. Each system under analysis is ranked against each comparison attribute and the ranks are transformed into rank order centroids. The final overall quality metric for each system is the weighted (by comparison attribute importance) sum of each attribute rating. The references provide specific examples of the process. There is little direct research on the theoretical soundness and effectiveness of the MAGIQ technique as a whole, however the use of hierarchical decomposition and the use of rank order centroids in multi-criteria decision analyses have been studied, with generally positive results. Anecdotal evidence suggests that the MAGIQ technique is both practical and useful.

== See also ==
- Multi-attribute utility
- Multi-attribute auction

== Sources ==
- Edwards, W. and Barron, F.H. "SMARTS and SMARTER: Improved Simple Methods for Multiattribute Utility Measurement", Organizational Behavior and Human Decision Processes, 60, (1994), pp. 306–25.
- Jia, Jianmin, Fischer, Gregory W., and Dyer, James S. "Attribute Weighting Methods and Decision Quality in the Presence of Response Error: A Simulation Study", Journal of Behavioral Decision Making (in press).
- McCaffrey, James. "The Analytic Hierarchy Process", MSDN Magazine, June 2005 (Vol. 20, No. 6), pp. 139–144. See .
- McCaffrey, James. "Multi-Attribute Global Inference of Quality (MAGIQ)", Software Test and Performance Magazine, August 2005 (Vol. 2, No. 7), pp. 28–32.
- McCaffrey, James, and Koski, Nasa. "Competitive Analysis Using MAGIQ", MSDN Magazine, October 2006 (Vol. 21, No. 11), pp. 35–39. See .
