= Ebidding =

An electronic bidding system is an electronic bidding event (without awarding commitment) according to defined negotiation rules (eAgreement). A buyer and two or more suppliers take part in this online event.

== eBidding in comparison to eAuction ==
An eAuction, in contrast to an eBidding, automatically leads to the acceptance of the best tender by the buyer. As a result, buyers tend to make more competitive offers during an eAuction. Aspects both auction set-ups have in common are: having one buyer and multiple suppliers involved, using the internet for the realtime event and the goal of the suppliers being to win the auction.

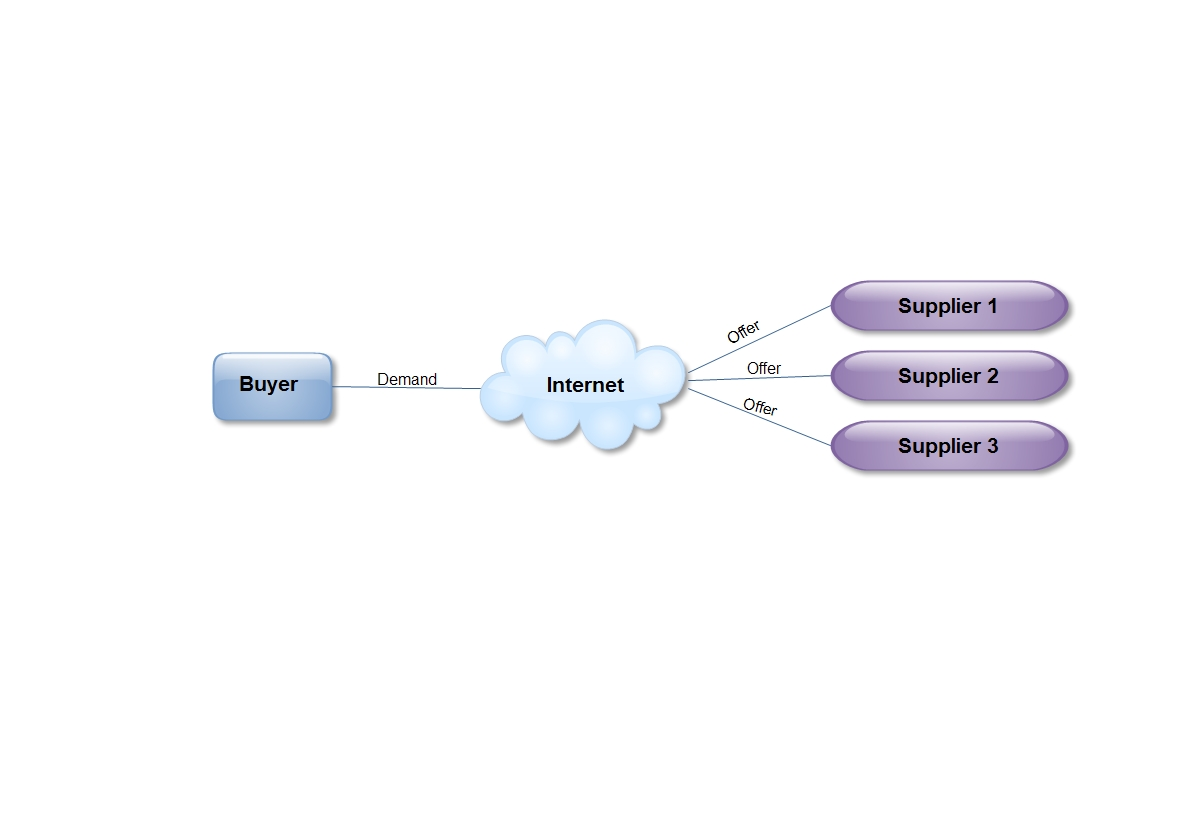
Overview showing the process for eBidding

== Area of Application and Criteria ==
eBidding can be used if the demand/the product can be specified, if the costs are reasonable with regard to the procurement volume and if multiple suppliers exist who show interest in selling the product using an eBidding. Furthermore, competitiveness needs to exist among the suppliers including dynamic prices. Based on the "Kraljic Portfolio Purchasing Model", the demanded products and services can be categorized by the two criteria „Profit Impact" and „Supply Risk". Products and services with a low Profit Impact and a low Supply Risk are called "Non-Critical Items". As Roland Bogaschewsky describes them in his essay "Electronic Procurement - Katalog-basierte Beschaffung, Marktplätze, B2B-Netzwerke", they are usually offered by many suppliers and are of little value. Non-Critical Items should therefore be purchased rather cost-effectively. "Bottleneck Items" are products and services which rank high on the Supply Risk dimension and low on the Profit Impact dimension. These items are also usually of little value. The high Supply Risk can be minimized by establishing alternative sources of supply. Products and services which have a high Profit Impact and a low Supply Risk are categorized as "Leverage Items". In this case, usually many suppliers offer these rather expensive items. This leaves room for intensive negotiations and auctions. "Strategic Items" rank high on Profit Impact and high on Supply Risk. Usually only very few suppliers offer these costly items. This categorization makes it possible to choose the method of procurement accordingly. Based on the essay by Roland Bogaschewsky, there need to be enough suppliers for a successful auction and the effort only pays off when dealing with articles that have a high profit impact. Therefore, Leverage Items are predestinated for eAuctions, creating a high competitive pressure which leads to lower prices. An eBidding does not create as much pressure and leaves room for strategic decisions. Therefore, an eBidding is also suitable for items that rank higher on the Supply Risk dimension but are still offered by enough suppliers

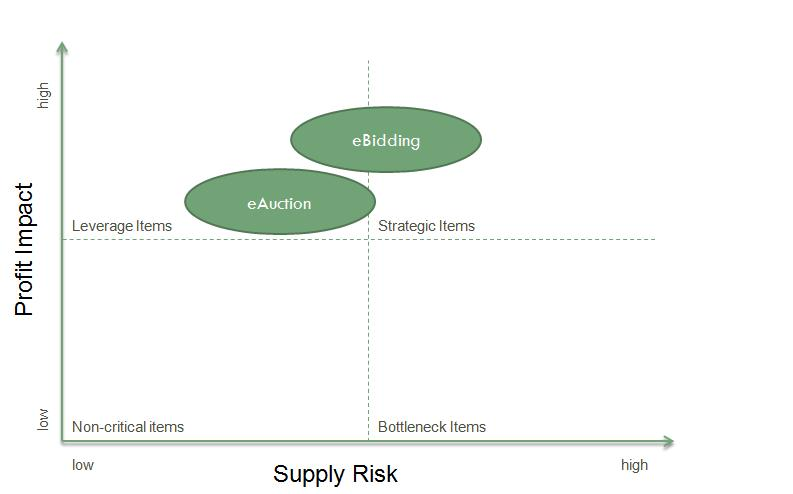
Priorities for eBidding and eAuction

== History and the current situation ==
Researches into bidding practices showed in 2006, that industries in the UK still abide to the exchange of paper documents, but with knowing that there must be a better way, and that CDs and e-mails were not the best solution. In industries, where all the documents are available in an electronic form, still 75% of the projects are bid by exchanging printed documents and 50% of the pricing documents are filled in manually. Nevertheless, the results of the poll showed, that there were huge advantages in exchanging electronic documents. eBidding is most often used in the automotive industry and in the retail market.

== The eBidding Process ==
First of all, the products and the amount needed have to be specified. In the next step, one has to choose a suitable and adapted auction design. After this step, one has to set a date for the online auction and choose potential suppliers. Then the chosen suppliers should receive an invitation and after their approval, the eAgreement can be defined. Since web based auctions do not meet the same legal requirements as usual auctions do, defining the eAgreement is a very important step. An eAgreement includes, for example, the general rules of the eBidding, additional contract regulations and the terms of delivery. To make sure, that every supplier has basic know-how of an eBidding, trainings should be conducted. Once the eAgreement has also been approved by the suppliers, the eBidding can start. During a set time frame the suppliers have the chance to make bids. In most biddings, the suppliers can see their current ranking based on the given bids. The results of the eBidding are often part of an overall supplier rating, which leads to a final decision. Lastly, a final report about the eBidding event including its final results is being created.

== Parameters of an eBidding and its influence on the behavior of the suppliers ==
An eBidding is characterized by different parameters, which also define the auction strategy.

- The bids can be visible for everyone anonymously or only the best price and a ranking are being shown. If the participants can see all bids, the competition becomes visible. This motivates the participants and gives them the opportunity to benchmark their prices.
- The bid decrement can be high or low. If the bid decrement is low, the suppliers can decide more freely which price to choose. Therefore, the bidding is going to be more dynamic. If the bid decrement is high, the bidding steps must be optimally designed to obtain the best results.
- There might be no extension of the auction if a set time is being given. In the case of an extension, the auction elongates itself for a certain time if a supplier makes a bid. This automatically leads to the best price. The length of the extension depends on the number and the complexity of the items.
- The starting price can be determined by the supplier as well as by the buyer. If the price is too low, the buyers could get discouraged and might leave the auction early. If the price is too high, the buyer faces the risk of buying too expensive and little knowledge of the market is being shown.
- Three auction designs are possible for an eBidding: In the Reverse English Auction, the suppliers lower their prices step-by-step, starting with a given price. The bidding ends once no one is willing to underbid the current price. A different option is the English Ticker which gradually declines the starting price by a predefined price interval. To make a bid, the price step has to be confirmed by the supplier. Also a First-price sealed-bid auction is possible. In this case, the suppliers make only one bid per item and then it is on the buyer to decide who the winner is. A Reverse Dutch Auction is not possible when doing an eBidding, since there will be only one winner.

== Advantages and Disadvantages ==
Advantages:

- Buyers receive competitive prices
- Buyers can reach suppliers worldwide
- Bids can be easily compared by the buyer
- Time saving in comparison to usual negotiations
- Cost saving due to less person hours, less paperwork and less travel costs
- Suppliers gain more knowledge of the market
- All bidders have access to the same information and the process is clearly defined
- Secure Bidding System
- Suppliers can react directly to bids from competitors

Disadvantages:

- The preparation becomes a crucial factor for the success of the auction
- Good infrastructure (e.g. electricity, internet) is necessary
- Investment costs for a bidding platform and for the training of employees
- Malpractice of the buyer is possible (e.g. artificially created competition)
