= Bid shading =

Bidding less than an item is worth in an auction

In an auction, bid shading is the practice of a bidder placing a bid that is below what they believe a bid is worth.

Bid shading is used for one of two purposes. In a common value auction with incomplete information, bid shading is used to compensate for the winner's curse. In such auctions, the good is worth the same amount to all bidders, but bidders don't know the value of the good and must independently estimate it. Since all bidders value the good equally, the winner will generally be the bidder whose estimate of the value is largest. But if we assume that in general bidders estimate the value accurately, then the highest bidder has overestimated the good's value and will end up paying more than it is worth. In other words, winning the auction carries bad news about a bidder's value estimate. A savvy bidder will anticipate this, and reduce their bid accordingly.

Bid shading is also used in first-price auctions, where the winning bidder pays the amount of his bid. If a participant bids an amount equal to their value for the good, they would gain nothing by winning the auction, since they are indifferent between the money and the good. Bidders will optimize their expected value by accepting a lower chance of winning in return for a higher payoff if they win.

In a first-price common value auction, a savvy bidder should shade for both of the above purposes.

== See also ==
- Jump bidding
