= Chinese auction =

Type of all-pay auction

Chinese auction is a type of the all-pay auction, where the probability of winning depends on the relative size of a participant's bid. The choice of the winner is done by a lottery, whereby the bidders compete for a higher chance of winning.

It is also known as penny raffle, chance auction and tricky tray.

== Etymology ==
The origin of the name is unknown but is thought to originated from the 19th Century when the term "Chinese" came to be used to mean cheap and described the inexpensive cost of the raffle and prizes.

There is no connection to Chinese culture.

== Significance ==
Chinese auctions are usually conducted during charity events for fundraising. Political elections and patent races can be modeled as Chinese auctions, in which the chance of winning is seen as proportional to the amount spent.

== Controversy ==
Some sources consider the term "chinese auction" as derogatory.
