= Auction cancellation hunter =

An auction cancellation hunter (German: Abbruchjäger) is a person who uses German law to their advantage by participating in online auctions in Germany, only bidding minimal amounts and expecting the auctions to be cancelled. If an auction is cancelled by the seller, they will claim for damages in the amount of the difference between the maximum bid at the time of the auction cancellation and the price of a replacement purchase of the offered item in the auction. If an auction is described incorrectly, it does not attract enough bidders, which can be beneficial to auction cancellation hunters. In Germany, an auction cancellation hunter failed at the Federal Court of Justice with his claim for damages due to lack of interest in the object of the auction.
