= Calor licitantis =

Irrational over-bidding in an auction

Calor licitantis is a Latin phrase, the literal translation of which is, "heat of soliciting." The functional use of the phrase in both modern times and antiquity is "bidder's heat". This is also known as "auction fever".

== Origins ==
The phenomenon of calor licitantis is believed to be as old as auctions themselves.

This term was first used in the court system of Rome to describe the irrational behavior of bidders at auctions. The use of the phrase seemed to describe both the mental state of the bidder and the result of that state; specifically, that through the bidding process undertaken by one suffering from calor licitantis, the price of an item was driven above and beyond its typical or expected value.

== Bidder's Heat in Antiquity ==
According to the Corpus Juris Civilis, the official body of Roman law, a bidder could be released from their bond to a purchase if calor licitantis had led to inflation of the price of the item in question such that the bidder could not reasonably pay to it. The passage in Corpus Juris Civilis that addresses calor licitantis this states:

Locatio vectigalium, quae calor licitantis ultra modum solitae conductionis inflavit, ita demum admittenda est, si fideiussores idoneos et cautionem is qui licitatione vicerit offerre paratus sit.

Translated: "A tax lease that has been inflated beyond the usual sum due to bidding fever shall only be admitted if the winner of the auction is able to provide reliable bondsmen and securities."

== Modern Equivalents ==
Certain contemporary consumer psychologists attribute bidding-fever to the pleasure derived from winning an auction, as opposed any particular desire to own the object being sold at auction. The irrational behavior focused on the success of acquiring an object is sometimes referred to be the related terms "loser's curse" and "winner's curse".

== See also ==
- Jump bidding - an apparently irrational behavior of bidders in an English auction.
