= Brazilian auction =

Method of auctioning

A Brazilian auction is a certain set of rules for a reverse auction. The buyer communicates the price she or he is willing to pay for the whole lot in advance. Then, the sellers bid on how many identical units they are willing to provide at that price. Like in English auction, bidding continues until a bid is made that no other bidder is willing to top. Other sources define Brazilian auction as a reverse auction with similarities to Dutch auction. Like in the previous definition, the overall price is constant. But instead of the price decreasing as in Dutch auction, the amount of identical items is decreasing.

== History ==
Brazilian auction as a variation of Dutch auction is introduced by Portum AG for Linde plc in the context of selling gas in Brazil.

The history of auctions in Brazil dates back to the colonial period, with auctions of slaves and confiscated goods in public squares. However, the regulation of the auctioneer profession only occurred in 1932, with Decree No. 21,981/32, signed by Getúlio Vargas.

=== Evolution ===
Colonial Period: Auctions were common, especially the sale of slaves and confiscated goods.

==== 19th Century ====
With the end of Portuguese rule, auctions became stronger as a way of acquiring imported products.

1851: Decree No. 858 distributed the "Regulations for Auction Agents in the Rio de Janeiro Square", regulating the organization and advertising of auctions.

==== 20th Century ====
1932: The auctioneer profession was regulated by Decree No. 21,981/32, with Getúlio Vargas.

1933: Changes in legislation in favor of auctioneers were recorded in Decree No. 22,427/33.

==== 21st Century ====
Today: Auctions continue to be an important commercial and financial activity in Brazil, with several areas of application, such as the sale of real estate, used goods, vehicles, among others.
