= Auction theory =

Branch of economics

Auction theory is a branch of applied economics that deals with how bidders act in auctions and researches how the features of auctions incentivise predictable outcomes. Auction theory is a tool used to inform the design of real-world auctions. Sellers use auction theory to raise higher revenues while allowing buyers to procure at a lower cost. The confluence of the price between the buyer and seller is an economic equilibrium. Auction theorists design rules for auctions to address issues that can lead to market failure. The design of these rulesets encourages optimal bidding strategies in a variety of informational settings. The 2020 Nobel Prize for Economics was awarded to Paul R. Milgrom and Robert B. Wilson "for improvements to auction theory and inventions of new auction formats".

== Introduction ==
Auctions facilitate transactions by enforcing a specific set of rules regarding the resource allocations of a group of bidders. Theorists consider auctions to be economic games that have two aspects: format and information. The format defines the rules for the announcement of prices, the placement of bids, the updating of prices, when the auction closes, and the way a winner is picked. The way auctions differ with respect to information regards the asymmetries of information that exist between bidders. In most auctions, bidders have some private information that they choose to withhold from their competitors. For example, bidders usually know their personal valuation of the item, which is unknown to the other bidders and the seller; however, the behaviour of bidders can influence valuations by other bidders.

== History ==
A purportedly historical event related to auctions is a custom in Babylonia, namely when men make an offer to women in order to marry them. The more familiar the auction system is, the more situations where auctions are conducted. There are auctions for various things, such as livestock, rare and unusual items, and financial assets.

Non-cooperative games have a long history, beginning with Cournot's duopoly model. A 1994 Nobel Laureate for Economic Sciences, John Nash, proved a general-existence theorem for non-cooperative games, which moves beyond simple zero-sum games. This theory was generalized by Vickrey (1961) to deal with the unobservable value of each buyer. By the early 1970s, auction theorists had begun defining equilibrium bidding conditions for single-object auctions under most realistic auction formats and information settings. Recent developments in auction theory consider how multiple-object auctions can be performed efficiently.

== Auction types ==
There are traditionally four types of auctions that are used for the sale of a single item:

- First-price sealed-bid auction in which bidders place their bids in sealed envelopes and simultaneously hand them to the auctioneer. The envelopes are opened and the individual with the highest bid wins, paying the amount bid. This form of auction requires strategic considerations since bidders must not only consider their own valuations but other bidders' possible valuations. The first formal analysis of such an auction was by Vickrey (1961). For the case of two buyers and uniformly distributed values, he showed that the symmetric-equilibrium strategy was to submit a bid equal to half of the buyer's valuation.
- Second-price sealed-bid auctions (Vickrey auctions) which are the same as first-price sealed-bid auctions except that the winner pays a price equal to the second-highest bid. The logic of this auction type is that the dominant strategy for all bidders is to bid their true valuation. William Vickrey was the first scholar to study second-price valuation auctions, but their use goes back in history, with some evidence suggesting that Goethe sold his manuscripts to a publisher using the second-price auction format. Online auctions often use an equivalent version of Vickrey's second-price auction wherein bidders provide proxy bids for items. A proxy bid is an amount an individual values some item at. The online auction house will bid up the price of the item until the proxy bid for the winner is at the top. However, the individual only has to pay one increment higher than the second-highest price, despite their own proxy valuation.
- Open ascending-bid auctions (English auctions) are the oldest, and possibly most common, type of auction in which participants make increasingly higher bids, each stopping bidding when they are not prepared to pay more than the current highest bid. This continues until no participant is prepared to make a higher bid; the highest bidder wins the auction at the final amount bid. Sometimes the lot is sold only if the bidding reaches a reserve price set by the seller.
- Open descending-bid auctions (Dutch auctions) are those in which the price is set by the auctioneer at a level sufficiently high to deter all bidders, and is progressively lowered until a bidder is prepared to buy at the current price, winning the auction.

Most auction theory revolves around these four "basic" auction types. However, other types have also received some academic study (see Auction § Types). Developments in the world and in technology have also influenced the current auction system. With the existence of the internet, online auctions have become an option.

- Online auctions are efficient platforms for establishing precise prices based on supply and demand. Furthermore, they can overcome geographic boundaries. Online auction sites are used for a variety of purposes, such as online "garage sales" by companies liquidating unwanted inventory. A significant difference between online auctions and traditional auctions is that bidders on the internet are unable to inspect the actual item, leading to differences between initial perception and reality.

== Auction process ==
There are six basic activities that complement the auction-based trading process:

- Initial buyer and seller registration: authentication of trading parties, exchange of cryptography keys when the auction is online, and profile creation.
- Setting up a particular auction event: describing items sold or acquired and establishing auction rules. Auction rules define the type of auction, starting date, closing rules, and other parameters.
- Scheduling and advertising, as well as grouping of items of the same category to be auctioned together, is done to attract potential buyers. Popular auctions can be combined with less-popular auctions to persuade people to attend the less popular ones.
- Bidding step: bids are collected and bid control rules of the auction are implemented.
- Evaluation of bids and closing the auction: winners and losers are declared.
- Trade settlement: payment to seller, transfer of goods, fees to agents.

== Auction envelope theorem ==
The auction envelope theorem defines certain probabilities expected to arise in an auction.

=== Benchmark model ===
The benchmark model for auctions, as defined by McAfee and McMillan (1987), is as follows:

- All of the bidders are risk-neutral.
- Each bidder has a private valuation for the item, which is almost always independently drawn from some probability distribution.
- The bidders possess symmetric information.
- The payment is represented only as a function of the bids.

=== Win probability ===
In an auction a buyer bidding $B(v)$ wins if the opposing bidders make lower bids.

The mapping from valuations to bids is strictly increasing; the high-valuation bidder therefore wins.

In statistics the probability of having the "first" valuation is written as:

$W=F_{({\scriptstyle\text{1}})}(v)$

With independent valuations and N other bidders $W=F(v)^N$

=== The auction ===
A buyer's payoff is

$u(v,b) = w(b)(v-b)$

Let $B$ be the bid that maximizes the buyer's payoff.

Therefore

$u(v,B)>u(v,b)=W(b)(v-b)$

The equilibrium payoff is therefore

$U(v)=W(B)(v-B))$

Necessary condition for the maximum:

$\partial u/\partial b=0$ when $b=B$

The final step is to take the total derivative of the equilibrium payoff

$U'(v)=W(B)+\partial u/\partial b$

The second term is zero. Therefore

$U'(v)=W$

Then

$U'(v)=W$$=F_{({\scriptstyle\text{1}})}(v)$

Example uniform distribution with two buyers. For the uniform distribution the probability of having a higher value than one other buyer is $F(v)=v$.

Then $U'(v)=v$

The equilibrium payoff is therefore $U(v)=\textstyle \int_{0}^{v} \displaystyle xdx=(1/2)v^2$.

The win probability is $W=F(v)=v$.

$U(v)=W(B)(v-B))$

Then

$(1/2)v^2=v(v-B(v))$.

Rearranging this expression,

$B(v)=(1/2)v$

With three buyers, $U'(v)=W$$=F_{({\scriptstyle\text{1}})}(v)=F(v)^2=v^2$, then $B(v)=(2/3)v$

With $N+1$ buyers $B(v)=(N/(N+1))v$

Lebrun (1996) provides a general proof that there are no asymmetric equilibriums.

== Optimal auctions ==
=== Auctions from a buyer's perspective ===
The revelation principle is a simple but powerful insight.

In 1979 Riley & Samuelson (1981) proved a general revenue equivalence theorem that applies to all buyers and hence to the seller. Their primary interest was finding out which auction rule would be better for the buyers. For example, there might be a rule that all buyers pay a nonrefundable bid (such auctions are conducted on-line). The equivalence theorem shows that any allocation mechanism or auction that satisfies the four main assumptions of the benchmark model will lead to the same expected revenue for the seller. (Buyer i with value v has the same "payoff" or "buyer surplus" across all auctions.)

=== Symmetric auctions with correlated valuation distributions ===
The first model for a broad class of models was Milgrom and Weber's (1983) paper on auctions with affiliated valuations.

In a recent working paper on general asymmetric auctions, Riley (2022) characterized equilibrium bids for all valuation distributions. Each buyer's valuation can be positively or negatively correlated.

The revelation principle as applied to auctions is that the marginal buyer payoff or "buyer surplus" is P(v), the probability of being the winner.

In every participant-efficient auction, the probability of winning is 1 for a high-valuation buyer. The marginal payoff to a buyer is therefore the same in every such auction. The payoff must therefore be the same as well.

=== Auctions from the seller's perspective (revenue maximization) ===
Quite independently and soon after, Myerson (1981) used the revelation principle to characterize revenue-maximizing sealed high-bid auctions. In the "regular" case this is a participation-efficient auction. Setting a reserve price is therefore optimal for the seller. In the "irregular" case it has since been shown that the outcome can be implemented by prohibiting bids in certain sub-intervals.

Relaxing each of the four main assumptions of the benchmark model yields auction formats with unique characteristics.

- Risk-averse bidders incur some kind of cost from participating in risky behaviours, which affects their valuation of a product. In sealed-bid first-price auctions, risk-averse bidders are more willing to bid more to increase their probability of winning, which, in turn, increases the bid's utility. This allows sealed-bid first-price auctions to produce higher expected revenue than English and sealed-bid second-price auctions.
- In formats with correlated values—where the bidders' valuations of the item are not independent—one of the bidders, perceiving their valuation of the item to be high, makes it more likely that the other bidders will perceive their own valuations to be high. A notable example of this instance is the winner’s curse, where the results of the auction convey to the winner that everyone else estimated the value of the item to be less than they did. Additionally, the linkage principle allows revenue comparisons amongst a fairly general class of auctions with interdependence between bidders' values.
- The asymmetric model assumes that bidders are separated into two classes that draw valuations from different distributions (e.g., dealers and collectors in an antique auction).
- In formats with royalties or incentive payments, the seller incorporates additional factors, especially those that affect the true value of the item (e.g., supply, production costs, and royalty payments), into the price function.

The theory of efficient trading processes developed in a static framework relies heavily on the premise of non-repetition. For example, an auction-seller-optimal design (as derived in Myerson) involves the best lowest price that exceeds both the seller's valuation and the lowest possible buyer's valuation.

== Game-theoretic models ==
A game-theoretic auction model is a mathematical game represented by a set of players, a set of actions (strategies) available to each player, and a payoff vector corresponding to each combination of strategies. Generally, the players are the buyer(s) and the seller(s). The action set of each player is a set of bid functions or reservation prices (reserves). Each bid function maps the player's value (in the case of a buyer) or cost (in the case of a seller) to a bid price. The payoff of each player under a combination of strategies is the expected utility (or expected profit) of that player under that combination of strategies.

Game-theoretic models of auctions and strategic bidding generally fall into either of the following two categories. In a private values model, each participant (bidder) assumes that each of the competing bidders obtains a random private value from a probability distribution. In a common value model, the participants have equal valuations of the item, but they do not have perfectly accurate information to arrive at this valuation. In lieu of knowing the exact value of the item, each participant can assume that any other participant obtains a random signal, which can be used to estimate the true value, from a probability distribution common to all bidders. Usually, but not always, the private-values model assumes that the valuations are independent across bidders, whereas a common-value model usually assumes that the valueations are independent up to the common parameters of the probability distribution.

A more general category for strategic bidding is the affiliated values model, in which the bidder's total utility depends on both their individual private signal and some unknown common value. Both the private value and common value models can be perceived as extensions of the general affiliated values model.

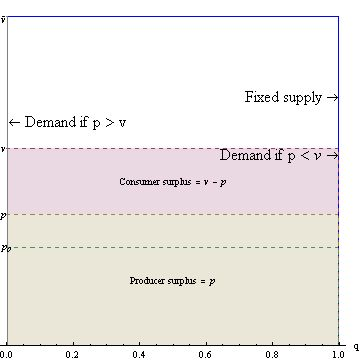
Ex-post equilibrium in a simple auction market

When it is necessary to make explicit assumptions about bidders' value distributions, most of the published research assumes symmetric bidders. This means that the probability distribution from which the bidders obtain their values (or signals) is identical across bidders. In a private values model which assumes independence, symmetry implies that the bidders' values are "i.i.d." – independently and identically distributed.

An important example (which does not assume independence) is Milgrom and Weber's general symmetric model (1982).

== Asymmetric auctions ==
The earliest paper on asymmetric value distributions is by Vickrey (1961). One buyer's valuation is uniformly distributed over the closed interval [0,1]. The other buyer has a known value of 1/2. Both the equilibrium and uniform bid distributions will support [0,1/2].

Jump-bidding;

Suppose that the buyers' valuations are uniformly distributed on [0,1] and [0,2] and buyer 1 has the wider support. Then both continue to bid half their valuations except at v=1.

The jump bid: buyer 2 jumps from bidding 1/2 to bidding 3/4. If buyer 1 follows suit she halves her profit margin and less than doubles her win probability (because of the tie breaking rule, a coin toss).

So buyer 2 does not jump. This makes buyer 1 much better off. He wins for use if his valuation is above 1/2.

The next paper, by Maskin and Riley (2000), provides a qualitative characterization of equilibrium bids when the "strong buyer" S has a value distribution that dominates that of the "weak buyer" under the assumption of conditional stochastic dominance (first-order stochastic dominance for every right-truncated value distribution). Another early contribution is Keith Waehrer's 1999 article. Later published research includes Susan Athey's 2001 Econometrica article, as well as that by Reny and Zamir (2004).

== Revenue equivalence ==
One of the major findings of auction theory is the revenue equivalence theorem. Early equivalence results focused on a comparison of revenues in the most common auctions. The first such proof, for the case of two buyers and uniformly distributed values, was by Vickrey (1961). In 1979 Riley & Samuelson (1981) proved a much more general result. (Quite independently and soon after, this was also derived by Myerson (1981)).The revenue equivalence theorem states that any allocation mechanism, or auction that satisfies the four main assumptions of the benchmark model, will lead to the same expected revenue for the seller (and player i of type v can expect the same surplus across auction types). The basic version of the theorem asserts that, as long as the Symmetric Independent Private Value (SIPV) environment assumption holds, all standard auctions give the same expected profit to the auctioneer and the same expected surplus to the bidder.

== Winner's curse ==
The winner's curse is a phenomenon which can occur in common value settings—when the actual values to the different bidders are unknown but correlated, and the bidders make bidding decisions based on estimated values. In such cases, the winner will tend to be the bidder with the highest estimate, but the results of the auction will show that the remaining bidders' estimates of the item's value are less than that of the winner, giving the winner the impression that they "bid too much".

In an equilibrium of such a game, the winner's curse does not occur because the bidders account for the bias in their bidding strategies. Behaviorally and empirically, however, winner's curse is a common phenomenon, described in detail by Richard Thaler.

== Optimal auctions ==
With identically and independently distributed private valuations, Riley and Samuelson (1981) showed that in any auction or auction-like action (such as the "War of Attrition") the allocation is "participant efficient", i.e. the item is allocated to the buyer submitting the highest bid, with a probability of 1. They then showed that allocation equivalence implied payoff equivalence for all reserve prices. They then showed that discriminating against low-value buyers by setting a minimum, or reserve, price would increase expected revenue. Along with Myerson, they showed that the most profitable reserve price is independent of the number of bidders. The reserve price only comes into play if there is a single bid. Thus it is equivalent to ask what reserve price would maximize the revenue from a single buyer. If values are uniformly distributed over the interval [0, 100], then the probability p(r) that this buyer's value is less than r is p(r) = (100-r)/100. Therefore the expected revenue is

p(r)*r = (100 - r)*r/100 =(r-50)*(r-50) + 25

Thus, the expected revenue-maximizing reserve price is 50. Also examined is the question of whether it might ever be more profitable to design a mechanism that awards the item to a bidder other than one with the highest value. Surprisingly, this is the case. As Maskin and Riley then showed, this is equivalent to excluding bids over certain intervals above the optimal reserve price.

Bulow and Klemperer (1996) have shown that an auction with n bidders and an optimally chosen reserve price generates a smaller profit for the seller than a standard auction with n+1 bidders and no reserve price.

== JEL classification ==
In the Journal of Economic Literature Classification System, game theory is classified as C7, under Mathematical and Quantitative Methods, and auctions are classified as D44, under Microeconomics.

== Applications to business strategy ==
Scholars of managerial economics have noted some applications of auction theory in business strategy. Namely, auction theory can be applied to preemption games and attrition games.

Preemption games are games where entrepreneurs preempt other firms by entering a market with new technology before it's ready for commercial deployment. The value generated from waiting for the technology to become commercially viable also increases the risk that a competitor will enter the market preemptively. Preemptive games can be modeled as a first-priced sealed auction. Both companies would prefer to enter the market when the technology is ready for commercial deployment; this can be considered the valuation by both companies. However, one firm might hold information stating that technology is viable earlier than the other firm believes. The company with better information would then "bid" to enter the market earlier, even as the risk of failure is higher.

Games of attrition are games of preempting other firms to leave the market. This often occurs in the airline industry as these markets are considered highly contestable. As a new airline enters the market, they will decrease prices to gain market share. This forces established airlines to also decrease prices to avoid losing market share. This creates an auction game. Usually, market entrants will use a strategy of attempting to bankrupt established firms. Thus, the auction is measured in how much each firm is willing to lose as they stay in the game of attrition. The firm that lasts the longest in the game wins the market share. This strategy has been used more recently by entertainment streaming services such as Netflix, Hulu, Disney+, and HBO Max which are all loss-making firms attempting to gain market share by bidding to expand entertainment content.

== Nobel Memorial Prize in Economic Sciences ==
Two Stanford University professors, Paul Milgrom and Robert Wilson, won the 2020 Nobel Memorial Prize in Economic Sciences for advancing auction theory by inventing several new auction formats, including the simultaneous multiple-round auction (SMRA), which combines the benefit of both the English (open-outcry), and sealed-bid, auctions. SMRAs are deemed to solve a problem facing the Federal Communications Commission (FCC). If the FCC were to sell all of its telecommunication frequency slots by using a traditional auction method, it would eventually either give away licenses for free or end up with a telecom monopoly in the United States.

The process of simultaneous multiple-round auctions is that there are three- to four-round auctions. Every bidder seals their bid, and the auctioneer announces the highest bid to all bidders at the end of each round. All the bidders can adjust and change their auction price and strategy after they listen to the highest bid in a particular round. The auction will continue until the highest bid of the current round is lower than the previous round's highest bid.

SMRA's first distinguishing feature is that the auction is taking place simultaneously for different items; therefore, it seriously increases the cost for speculators. For the same reason, sealed bidding can ensure that all bidding reflects the bidder’s valuation of the product. The second difference is that the bidding takes place in numerous rounds and the highest price of bidding is announced each round, allowing bidders to learn more about their competitors' preferences and information and to adjust their strategy accordingly, thus decreasing the effect of asymmetric information inside the auction. In addition, multiple-round bidding can maintain the bidder's activity in the auction. It has substantially increased the information the bidder has about the highest bid, because at the end of every round, the host will announce the highest bid after the bidding.
