= Eva M Meyersson Milgrom =

Swedish-born American social scientist

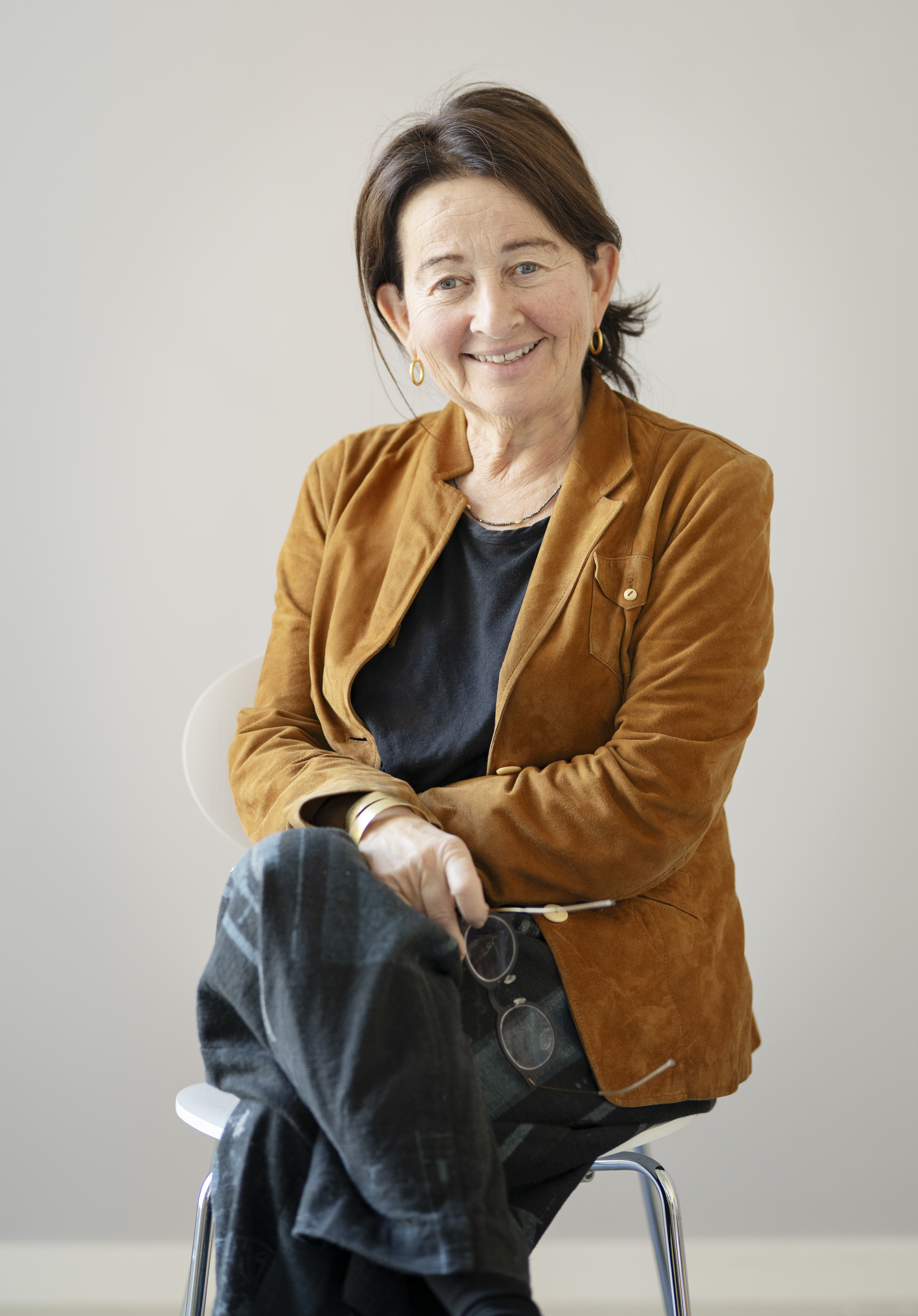

Eva Maria Meyersson Milgrom is a Swedish-born American social scientist publishing both in economic and sociology academic journals. Eva is a senior research scholar and a teacher at Stanford University, and affiliated with the Department of Sociology and Stanford Institute for Economic Policy Research, SIEPR.

== Biography ==
She received her Ph.D. from the Department of Sociology at Stockholm University in 1992.

Meyersson Milgrom is married to Paul R Milgrom, winner of the 2020 Nobel Memorial Prize in Economic Sciences. She is the daughter of Ulla and Per-Martin Meyerson and has a son, Erik Meyersson, a granddaughter Noomi, two step-children Elana and Joshua Thurston-Milgrom and a step-grandson Shepherd Thurston-Milgrom.

== Major contributions ==
Meyersson Milgrom's major contributions have mainly been in three areas: corporate governance (executive compensation, and the significance of ownership structure), organization and labor markets (wage-, promotion- and productivity, gender differences) and social networks (team composition, compensation of executive teams, firm performance).

Meyersson Milgrom has served as an expert witness on executive compensation and on board composition. She has also consulted on topics such as gender equity, how to organize for changing strategy, and the problems with ad hoc groups.

Meyersson Milgrom has been teaching and developed courses such as “An International Comparison of Corporate Governance Systems” and “Global Organizations, the Matrix of Change” in countries like China, Rwanda, Sweden and United States. She has also organised workshops, developed courses and taught classes on “Labor Market Analysis of Extreme Political Violence" and on "The Dynamics of Social, Political, and Economic Institutions".

== Selected bibliography ==
=== Selected articles ===
- 2022 When Should Control Be Shared?
- 2019 En fritänkare finner sin forskar miljö. IFN Jubileum skrift
- 2014 The significance of firm and occupation specific human capital for hiring and promotions
- 2012 Stabilizing brokerage
- 2011 Dynamics of social, political, and economic institutions
- 2011 Demons in the System
- 2010 Cohort Effects in Promotion and Wages
- 2007 Distributive Justice and CEO Compensation
- 2006 The Gender Productivity Gap.
- 2006 The Glass Ceiling in the United States and Sweden: Lessons from the Family Friendly Corner of the World, 1970 to 1990
- 2003 Corporate Governance and Structural Change. European Challenges
- 2003 Pay, Risk, And Productivity. The Case Of Findland,1980-1996
- 2000 Equal Pay for Equal Work? Evidence from Sweden, Norway and the U.S.
- 1999 More Glory and Less Injustice: The Glass-Ceiling in Sweden 1970-1990.
- 1998 Finns det ett glastak för kvinnor? En studie av svenska arbetsplatser i privat näringsliv 1970-* * 1990.
- 1997 Lika lön för lika arbete en studie av svenska förhållanden i internationell belysning.
- 1997 Är lönediskriminering en myt? En internationell jämförelse av lönediskriminering av kvinnor.
- 1997 Är kvinnor utsatta för lönediskriminering? * 1995 Kompensationskontrakt för ledningsgrupper i svenska börsnoterade företag.
- 1994 Human capital, Social Capital and Compensation. The impact of social networks on managers’ income.
- 1993 Kontrollmöjligheter i fall av asymmetrisk information. Två fallsudier; riksbanken och husläkarsystemet.
- 1993 The Impact of Financial and Social Capital On Firm Performance.
- 1992 Doctoral Thesis ‘The Impact of Ownership Structure and Executive Team Composition on Firm Performance The resolution of a leadership paradox’.

=== Books ===
- Ägarmakt och omvandling. Den svenska modellen utmanad, Ed Hans Tson Söderstrom, Ekonomirådsrapport 2003 Stockholm:SNS English summary, The Swedish Corporate Governance System, and the European Challenge. ISBN 978-91-7150-898-0
- Staten och bolagskapitalet om aktiv styrning av statliga bolag, 'State as a corporate owner' with Susanne Lindh, Document ID: Ds 1998:64
- Kompensationssystem i svenska börsnoterade företag, 'Compensation contracts in Swedish publicly traded firms' 1994 Almqvist och Wicksell, ISBN 91-7204-470-5.5
