= Peter Cramton =

American economist and academic

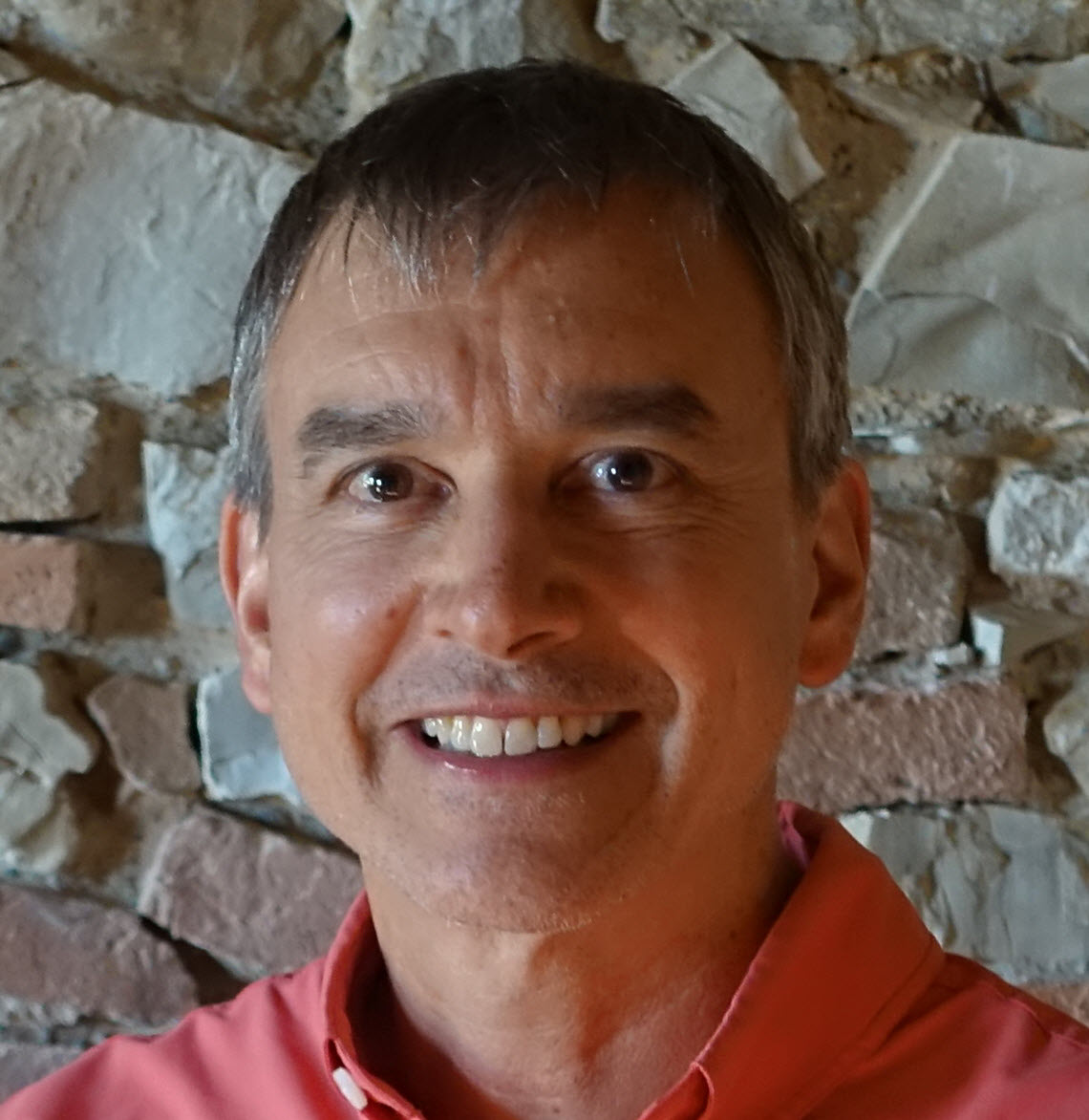
- Born: November 12, 1957 (age 68)
- Spouse: Catherine Durnell Cramton

Academic background
- Education: Cornell University (BS); Stanford University (PhD)
- Thesis: The Role of Time and Information in Bargaining (1984)
- Doctoral advisor: Robert Wilson

Academic work
- Discipline: Economist
- Sub-discipline: Auctions and Market Design
- Institutions: University of Maryland since 1993; University of Cologne since 2018

Peter Cramton is an American economist and academic. He is professor of economics at the University of Maryland, Emeritus since 2018, and holds the Market Design Chair in Economics at the University of Cologne.

Cramton's research has focused on three related areas. The first is bargaining theory where he studies the role time and information play in determining bargaining outcomes. The second is auction theory and practice, where he examines the auctioning of interrelated items, such as radio spectrum, electricity, financial securities, rough diamonds, airport slots, and top-level domains. His work in bargaining and auctions is closely tied to his third theme: market design. His market design work concerns communications, energy, finance, transportation, and health industries.

Cramton has written over one hundred articles. As of 2024, his work has been cited 19,781 times according to Google Scholar. His best known publications are: "Bargaining with Incomplete Information: An Infinite-Horizon Model with Two-Sided Uncertainty", "Dissolving a Partnership Efficiently, Strategic Delay in Bargaining with Two-Sided Uncertainty", "Strikes and Holdouts in Wage Bargaining: Theory and Data, The FCC Spectrum Auctions: An Early Assessment", "Demand Reduction and Inefficiency in Multi-Unit Auctions", and "The High-Frequency Trading Arms Race: Frequent Batch Auctions as a Market Design Response".

== Early life and education ==
Cramton received a Bachelor of Science from Cornell University in 1980. He then joined Stanford University, where he received his Doctor of Philosophy in 1984. His dissertation was "The Role of Time and Information in Bargaining."

== Career ==
Cramton joined Yale University in 1984 as an assistant professor, becoming associate professor in 1988. He worked at Stanford University as a national fellow of the Hoover Institution in 1992–93. He then joined the University of Maryland in 1993 as an associate professor. He was promoted to full professor in 1996.

Cramton spent 2015–17 abroad as professor at the European University Institute in Florence, Italy, and as a member of the International Faculty at the University of Cologne in Germany. In 2017, he joined the Reinhard Selten Institute as a Research Affiliate. In 2018, he joined the University of Cologne as Professor of Economics and Chair of Market Design.

In 2010, Cramton launched an effort to improve Medicare procurement. It gained some traction, and in 2012, he testified before the U.S. Congress on the matter. The innovations to the market were finally implemented in 2019. Cramton has been an investigator on ten National Science Foundation grants. He has also received grants from the Federal Aviation Administration and the US Department of Agriculture.

Cramton has been the associate editor of Management Science since 2018.

He was also on the Board of Directors of the Electric Reliability Council of Texas (ERCOT). This attracted controversy when, after the 2021 Texas power crisis that occurred during Winter Storm Uri, it was reported that several members of the ERCOT Board of Directors (including Cramton) did not live in Texas. Directly after the power outages, there were calls for him to resign. On February 23, 2021, Cramton signed a letter of resignation along with three other directors of ERCOT, who also lived outside of Texas.

=== Work with auction design ===
Cramton is a major advocate for the use of auctions, rather than the grandfathering, of emission permits. He has helped to design many electricity auctions that are conducted throughout the world. In the area of telecommunications, together with Larry Ausubel and Paul Milgrom, he invented the combinatorial clock auction. This combinatorial auction design has been used for more than ten major spectrum auctions in Europe, Canada and Australia.

In financial markets, together with Eric Budish and John Shim, he has been a critic of high-frequency trading. His book, Combinatorial Auctions, edited with Yoav Shoham and Richard Steinberg, has more than 1,300 citations. The book explains why and how to conduct auctions with package bidding.

He has provided advice on electricity auctions and electricity market restructuring in New England, Alberta, Colombia, the UK, France and New Zealand. He serves on the Board of Directors of the Electric Reliability Council of Texas (ERCOT), the electricity grid operator in Texas. He has helped to guide spectrum regulators in the US, Canada, the UK and Australia, and he has advised bidders in many countries and industries. He has helped to change the common sales practice for rough diamonds from opaque cartel pricing to transparent auctions.

One of Cramton's latest projects is to reduce traffic congestion and pollution emissions through use of scheduling, routing and real-time pricing.

=== Entrepreneurship ===
Along with his academic work, Cramton has been involved in entrepreneurial and board activities with many organizations. In 1993, he founded Cramton Associates, which provides consultancy on auctions and market design to governments and organizations. Through Cramton Associates, Cramton has advised many governments in the design of complex auction markets.

In 2025, Cramton founded Forward Market Design, a consultancy specializing in the design, simulation, and engineering of markets for industries of the 21st century.

Cramton serves as the Chief Economist of Innovative Auctions, which provides web-based auction systems to governments and industry. He is also the Chief Economist of Tremor, a company that uses smart markets to improve reinsurance markets. Cramton is a member of the Academic Advisory Group for CartaX, a company that provides a platform to trade private equity.

In 1995, Cramton joined Market Design Inc. as a principal together with Paul Milgrom, Robert Wilson, Preston McAfee and John McMillan. Market Design Inc. (MDI) was founded to bring innovative auction ideas to practice. MDI's main application was spectrum auctions, although between 1995 and 2016 MDI did projects in many industries and countries. In 1999, Cramton became president of MDI and in 2003 he became chairman of the board, a post he held until MDI closed in 2016.

In 1999, together with Larry Ausubel and Paul Milgrom, Cramton led an effort to organize the exchange of TV broadcast spectrum for mobile communications use—an effort called Spectrum Exchange. Cramton and his partners worked from 1999 to 2001 to organize a spectrum exchange between TV broadcasters and mobile carriers. The effort ultimately failed, because the mobile carriers had enough spectrum from early spectrum auctions and TV broadcasters had unrealistic views about what they should be paid given the extremely high spectrum auction prices observed during the dotcom and telecom bubble of 2000. Moreover, Spectrum Exchange did not have a good solution to the holdout problem: the problem of an essential TV station holding out to capture the windfall gains. That solution had to come from the Federal Communications Commission (FCC) and required enabling legislation. Ultimately, the need for more spectrum led Congress to pass enabling legislation for a broadcast incentive auction. The FCC held the auction from March 2016 to March 2017. The auction made available 70 MHz of contiguous spectrum in the TV band for mobile communications. This enabled the smaller network operators, such as T-Mobile, to gain essential low-band spectrum to compete effectively with the larger incumbents, AT&T and Verizon.

== Research and ideas ==
Cramton's research has followed three related themes: bargaining, auctions and market design. Climate policy is one important application of market design.

=== Bargaining ===
In the beginning of his career, Cramton's research was focused on bargaining. His first published article, which appeared in the Review of Economic Studies, analyzed a dynamic bargaining model where the seller makes repeated offers to a buyer. The paper shows how timing and information affect the rational behavior of agents when commitment is not possible. Since the bargainers are uncertain about whether trade is desirable, they must communicate some of their private information before an agreement can be reached. This need for learning, due to incomplete information about preferences, results in bargaining inefficiencies: trade often occurs after costly delay. Thus, the model provided an explanation for the inefficient bargaining behavior that often occurs in practice.

Cramton continued to develop the same theme in his 1992 Review of Economic Studies article. The role of strategic delay is analyzed in an infinite-horizon alternating-offer model of bargaining. Again, the two players each possess private information and they are impatient in that delaying agreement is costly. An equilibrium is constructed in which the bargainers signal the strength of their bargaining positions by delaying prior to making an offer. A bargainer expecting large gains from trade is more impatient than one expecting small gains, and hence makes concessions earlier on. Trade eventually occurs whenever gains from trade exist, but due to the private information, only after costly delay.

His 1992 American Economic Review article with Joe Tracy is the best known of several of his papers that crossed over between bargaining and labor economics. They augment the standard bargaining model with additional moves— strikes and holdouts. They develop a private-information model of contract negotiations between the union and management, in which the form of dispute can signal the player's value.

=== Auctions ===
Cramton has also written many well-cited articles assessing spectrum auctions. The best known of these was published in the 1997 Journal of Economics & Management Strategy. It assessed the first several FCC broadband auctions. His 1995 article, "Money Out of Thin Air: The Nationwide Narrowband PCS Auction", also in the Journal of Economics & Management Strategy, provides extensive analysis of the first FCC spectrum auction (Auction #1). The paper identifies key elements of bidding strategy, such as demand reduction, and identifies design flaws that the FCC ultimately corrected, such as bid signaling with the trailing digits of bids.

=== Market design ===
Cramton's first foray in the area of market design was when, with two graduate school friends, he wrote his 1985 Econometrica paper on dissolving a partnership efficiently. Roger Myerson and Mark Satterthwaite had recently written their classic paper proving that, with two-sided incomplete information, independent private values and overlapping supports, any budget-balanced mechanism for selling a good is necessarily inefficient. Cramton and his co-authors considered the scenario where two or more partners jointly own an asset. Each partner has a valuation for the asset. As in the bargaining model, the valuations are known privately and drawn independently from a common probability distribution. They characterize the set of all incentive compatible and interim-individually-rational trading mechanisms and give a simple necessary and sufficient condition for such mechanisms to dissolve the partnership efficiently. A bidding game is constructed that achieves such dissolution whenever it is possible. In contrast to Myerson and Satterthwaite's result, a partnership can be dissolved efficiently provided no single partner owns too large a share. The paper highlights that Myerson and Satterthwaite's inefficiency results depends both on uncertainty about the existence of gains from trade and the extreme asymmetry in ownership of buyer-seller bargaining. When the ownership asymmetry is reduced, efficient trade becomes possible.

Cramton's most-cited market design paper is his 2014 Review of Economic Studies article on demand reduction. Together with co-authors Larry Ausubel, Marek Pycia, Marzena Rostek and Marek Weretka, he considers auctions involving the sale of many related goods, such as Treasury auctions, spectrum auctions and electricity auctions. In multi-unit auctions, a bid for one unit may affect payments for other units won, giving rise to an incentive to shade bids differently across units. They establish that such differential bid shading results generically in ex post inefficient allocations in the uniform-price and pay-as-bid auctions. They also show that, in general, the efficiency and revenue rankings for the two formats are ambiguous. However, in settings with symmetric bidders, the pay-as-bid auction often outperforms. With diminishing marginal utility, symmetric information and linearity, pay-as-bid yields greater expected revenues. They explain the rankings through multi-unit effects, which have no counterparts in auctions with unit demands. They attribute the new incentives separately to multi-unit but constant marginal utility and diminishing marginal utility.

In the 2015 Quarterly Journal of Economics piece, Cramton and co-authors Eric Budish and John Shim argued that the high-frequency trading arms race is a symptom of flawed market design. Their key insight is that obvious mechanical arbitrage opportunities, like those observed in the data, are built into the current market design, which uses a continuous limit order book. The resulting arbitrage rents harm liquidity provision and induce a never-ending socially wasteful arms race for speed. Instead of the current market design, they argue that financial exchanges should use frequent batch auctions: uniform price double auctions conducted, e.g., every tenth of a second. That is, time should be treated as discrete instead of continuous, and orders should be processed in a batch auction instead of serially. Discrete time reduces the value of tiny speed advantages, and the auction transforms competition on speed into competition on price. Consequently, frequent batch auctions eliminate the arbitrage rents, enhance liquidity for investors, and put an end to the high-frequency trading arms race. As chair of the market design area at the University of Cologne. His academic duties focus on theoretical, empirical, and experimental research in market design. Practical work includes advising governments and companies on the design and implementation of specific markets.

=== Climate policy ===
In 1999, Cramton co-authored a book chapter with Suzi Kerr entitled "The Distributional Effects of Carbon Regulation", published in The Market and the Environment. They proposed that an auction of carbon permits, as opposed to grand fathering, is more desirable, because it avoids windfall gains to polluters. The idea was developed further in a paper in Energy Policy. Early adopters of emission trading schemes, such as the European Union, initially grand fathered allowances in proportion to emissions. However, consistent with the Cramton-Kerr analysis, large windfall profits to these polluters ultimately drove the EU to auction allowances.

In a 2015 article in Nature, and in the book, Global Carbon Pricing, Cramton and his co-authors explain that reciprocity is an essential missing ingredient in promoting cooperation in climate negotiations among countries.

== Awards and honors ==
- 1984 – Leonard J. Savage Thesis Award for an outstanding dissertation in Bayesian Economics
- 1992-93 - Hoover National Fellow, Hoover Institution, Stanford University
- 2007 – Resident Scholar, Rockefeller Foundation, Villa Serbelloni, Bellagio, Italy
- 2012 – Distinguished Service Award, American Association for Homecare
- 2014 – Winner of the AQR Insight Award for most insightful unpublished paper in finance
- 2015 – Winner of the Utah Winter Finance Conference Best Paper Award
- 2021 - Fellow of the Econometric Society

== Publications ==
=== Books ===
- Combinatorial Auctions, (with Yoav Shoham and Richard Steinberg) MIT Press, 2006.
- Wind Energy in Colombia: A Framework for Market Entry (with Walter Vergara, Alejandro Deeb, Natsuko Toba, and Irene Leino) The World Bank, Washington, DC, July 2010.
- Global Carbon Pricing—The Path to Climate Cooperation (with David JC MacKay, Axel Ockenfels and Steven Stoft), MIT Press, 2017.

=== Selected papers ===
- "Bargaining with Incomplete Information: An Infinite-Horizon Model with Two-Sided Uncertainty," Review of Economic Studies, 51, 579–593, 1984.
- "Dissolving a Partnership Efficiently," (with Robert Gibbons and Paul Klemperer) Econometrica, 55, 615–632, 1987.
- "Strategic Delay in Bargaining with Two-Sided Uncertainty," Review of Economic Studies, 59, 205–225, 1992.
- "Strikes and Holdouts in Wage Bargaining: Theory and Data," (with Joseph S. Tracy) American Economic Review, 82, 100–121, 1992.
- "Money Out of Thin Air: The Nationwide Narrowband PCS Auction," Journal of Economics and Management Strategy, 4, 267–343, 1995.
- "The FCC Spectrum Auctions: An Early Assessment," Journal of Economics and Management Strategy, 6:3, 431–495, 1997.
- "Ascending Auctions," European Economic Review, 42:3-5, 745–756, May 1998.
- "Collusive Bidding: Lessons from the FCC Spectrum Auctions," (with Jesse Schwartz) Journal of Regulatory Economics, 17, 229–252, May 2000.
- "Bargaining with Incomplete Information," (with Lawrence M. Ausubel and Raymond J. Deneckere), Robert J. Aumann and Sergiu Hart, eds., Handbook of Game Theory, Vol. 3, Amsterdam: Elsevier Science B.V., Chapter 50, 1897–1945, 2002.
- "Tradeable Carbon Permit Auctions: How and Why to Auction Not Grandfather,” (with Suzi Kerr) Energy Policy, 30, 333–345, 2002.
- "A Capacity Market that Makes Sense," (with Steven Stoft) Electricity Journal, 18, 43–54, August/September 2005.
- "The Clock-Proxy Auction: A Practical Combinatorial Auction Design," (with Lawrence M. Ausubel and Paul Milgrom) in Peter Cramton, Yoav Shoham, and Richard Steinberg (eds.), Combinatorial Auctions, Chapter 5, 115–138, MIT Press, 2006.
- "Capacity Market Fundamentals" (with Axel Ockenfels and Steven Stoft), Economics of Energy & Environmental Policy, 2:2, September 2013.
- "Demand Reduction and Inefficiency in Multi-Unit Auctions," (with Lawrence M. Ausubel, Marek Pycia, Marzena Rostek, and Marek Weretka) Review of Economic Studies, 81:4, 1366–1400, 2014.
- "The High-Frequency Trading Arms Race: Frequent Batch Auctions as a Market Design Response" (with Eric Budish and John Shim), Quarterly Journal of Economics, 130:4, 1547–1621, November 2015.
