= Luis Cabral =

Luis Cabral may refer to:

- Luís Cabral, president of Guinea-Bissau and Cape Verde
- Luis Cabral (archer), Guamanian archer
- Luis Cabral (footballer), Paraguayan footballer
- Luís Cabral (economist), Paganelli-Bull Professor of Economics and International Business at New York University's Stern School of Business
