= David M. Kreps =

American economist (born 1950)

- Born: 1950 (age 75–76); New York City, U.S.
- Education: Dartmouth College (BA); Stanford University (PhD)
- Children: 3
- Awards: John Bates Clark Medal, Erwin Plein Nemmers Prize in Economics, John J. Carty Award for the Advancement of Science
- Scientific career
- Fields: Game theory, Decision Theory, Finance
- Workplaces: Stanford University
- Doctoral advisor: Evan Lyle Porteus
- Doctoral students: Chi-fu Huang; Robert Gibbons

David Marc "Dave" Kreps (born 1950) is an American game theorist, economist and professor at the Graduate School of Business at Stanford University (since 1980).

== Education and career ==
He earned his A.B. from Dartmouth College in 1972 and his Ph.D. from Stanford in 1975. Kreps won the John Bates Clark Medal in 1989. He was awarded an honorary Ph.D. by the Université Paris-Dauphine in 2001.

The Stanford University Department of Economics appointed Kreps the Adams Distinguished Professor of Management. He is known for his analysis of dynamic choice models and non-cooperative game theory, particularly the idea of sequential equilibrium, which he developed with Stanford Business School colleague Robert B. Wilson.

With colleagues Paul Milgrom and Robert B. Wilson, he was awarded the 2018 John J. Carty Award for the Advancement of Science. He is a member of the National Academy of Sciences. In 2018, Kreps was awarded the Erwin Plein Nemmers Prize in Economics by Northwestern University.

He has also written many books, including Microeconomics for Managers, A Course in Microeconomic Theory, and Game Theory and Economic Modeling.

== Selected publications ==
- Kreps, D. M., Milgrom, P., Roberts, J., & Wilson, R. (1982). Rational cooperation in the finitely repeated prisoners' dilemma. Journal of Economic Theory, 27(2), 245-252.
- Kreps, D. M. (1990). Corporate culture and economic theory. Perspectives on Positive Political Economy, 90(109-110), 8.
- Kreps, D. M., & Wilson, R. (1982). Reputation and imperfect information. Journal of Economic Theory, 27(2), 253-279.
- Cho, I. K., & Kreps, D. M. (1987). Signaling games and stable equilibria. Quarterly Journal of Economics, 102(2), 179-221.
- Harrison, J. M., & Kreps, D. M. (1979). Martingales and arbitrage in multiperiod securities markets. Journal of Economic Theory, 20(3), 381-408.
- Kreps, D. M., & Wilson, R. (1982). Sequential equilibria. Econometrica: Journal of the Econometric Society, 863-894.
- David M. Kreps (1990). Game Theory and Economic Modelling. Oxford University Press. ISBN 978-0-19-828381-2.

== See also ==
- Trade-off Talking Rational Economic Person
