= Robert B. Wilson =

Economist and winner of the 2020 Nobel Prize in Economics

- Born: May 16, 1937 (age 89); Geneva, Nebraska, U.S.
- Education: Harvard University (BA, MBA, DBA)
- Known for: Game theory in industrial organization Sequential quadratic programming
- Awards: Golden Goose Award (2014); BBVA Foundation Frontiers of Knowledge Award (2015); Nobel Prize in Economics (2020)
- Scientific career
- Fields: Economist; Management science
- Workplaces: Stanford University
- Thesis: A simplicial algorithm for concave programming (1963)
- Doctoral advisor: Howard Raiffa
- Doctoral students: Claude d'Aspremont Lynden; Peter Cramton; Robert Gibbons; Benjamin Golub; Bengt R. Holmström; Matthew O. Jackson; Paul Milgrom; Jean-Pierre Ponssard; Robert W. Rosenthal; Alvin E. Roth; Yuliy Sannikov

Robert Butler "Bob" Wilson, Jr. (born May 16, 1937) is an American economist who is the Adams Distinguished Professor of Management, Emeritus at Stanford University. He was jointly awarded the 2020 Nobel Memorial Prize in Economic Sciences, together with his Stanford colleague and former student Paul R. Milgrom, "for improvements to auction theory and inventions of new auction formats". Two more of his students, Alvin E. Roth and Bengt Holmström, are also Nobel Laureates in their own right.

Wilson is known for his contributions to management science and business economics. His doctoral thesis introduced sequential quadratic programming, which became a leading iterative method for nonlinear programming. With other mathematical economists at Stanford, he helped to reformulate the economics of industrial organization and organization theory using non-cooperative game theory. His research on nonlinear pricing has influenced policies for large firms, particularly in the energy industry, especially electricity.

== Early life and academic career ==
Wilson was born on May 16, 1937, in Geneva, Nebraska. He graduated from Lincoln High School in Lincoln, Nebraska and earned a full scholarship to Harvard University. He received his B.A degree from Harvard College in 1959. Wilson subsequently obtained an M.B.A. in 1961 and a D.B.A. in 1963 from Harvard Business School. He worked at the University of California, Los Angeles, for a very brief time and then joined the faculty at Stanford University. He has been on the faculty of the Stanford Business School since 1964. He was also an affiliated faculty member of Harvard Law School from 1993 to 2001.

== Research ==
Wilson is known for research and teaching on market design, pricing, negotiation, and related topics concerning industrial organization and information economics. He is an expert on game theory and its applications. He has been a major contributor to auction designs and competitive bidding strategies in the oil, communication, and power industries, and to the design of innovative pricing schemes. His work on pricing of priority service for electric power has been implemented in the utility industry.

Wilson's 1968 Econometrica paper The Theory of the Syndicates influenced a whole generation of economics, finance, and accounting students. The paper poses a fundamental question: Under what conditions does the expected utility representation describe the behavior of a group of individuals who choose lotteries and share risk in a Pareto-optimal way?

He has published about a hundred articles in professional journals and books since completing his education. He has been an associate editor of several journals, and delivered several public lectures.

In 1993, Wilson published a book on Nonlinear Pricing. It is an encyclopedic analysis of tariff design and related topics for public utilities, including power, communications, and transport. The book won the 1995 Leo Melamed Prize, a prize awarded biannually by the University of Chicago for "outstanding scholarship by a business professor."

Other contributions to game theory includes wage bargaining and strikes, and in legal contexts, settlement negotiations. He has authored some of the basic studies of reputational effects in predatory pricing, price wars, and other competitive battles.

== Honors ==
Since Wilson completed the Bachelor, Master's, and Doctoral Degrees at Harvard College and the Harvard Business School, he has published about 100 articles in professional journals and books, for which he has received many honors.

=== Nobel Memorial Prize in Economics ===
The Royal Swedish Academy of Sciences awarded Wilson and Paul Milgrom as the co-recipients of the 2020 Nobel Memorial Prize in Economics for having "improved auction theory and invented new auction formats, benefitting sellers, buyers and taxpayers around the world". Alvin Roth (an economist who was a co-recipient of the 2012 Nobel Memorial Prize and who had Wilson as his doctoral advisor) said that Wilson and Milgrom "haven't just profoundly changed the way we understand auctions – they have changed how things are auctioned." Specifically, the Academy acknowledged Wilson's efforts in analyzing common value auctions, where bidders derive a common value from the underlying resource, and his theoretical proofs that bidders tend to bid lower than their best estimates of common value, in order to avoid the winner's curse. Some examples of common value auctions include radio frequency spectrum, and minerals.

=== Memberships and awards ===
He is an elected member of the National Academy of Sciences, a designated 'distinguished fellow' of the American Economic Association, and a fellow, former officer and Council member of the Econometric Society. He was conferred an honorary Doctor of Economics degree in 1986 by the Norwegian School of Economics and Business Administration. In 1995, he was conferred an honorary Doctor of Laws degree by the University of Chicago. In 2014, Wilson won a Golden Goose Award for his work involving auction design.

He has won the BBVA Foundation Frontiers of Knowledge Award (2015) in the Economics, Finance and Management category for his "pioneering contributions to the analysis of strategic interactions when economic agents have limited and different information about their environment". With colleagues David M. Kreps and Paul Milgrom, he was awarded the 2018 John J. Carty Award for the Advancement of Science.

=== Political views ===
In June 2024, 16 Nobel Prize in Economics laureates, including Wilson, signed an open letter arguing that Donald Trump’s fiscal and trade policies coupled with efforts to limit the Federal Reserve's independence would reignite inflation in the United States.

== See also ==
- Wilson doctrine (economics)
