= Nancy Stokey =

American economist

- Born: Nancy Laura Stokey; May 8, 1950 (age 76); United States
- Spouse: Robert Lucas Jr. (died 2023)

Academic background
- Education: University of Pennsylvania (BA); Harvard University (PhD)
- Doctoral advisor: Kenneth Arrow

Academic work
- Discipline: Mathematical Economics
- Institutions: University of Chicago

Nancy Laura Stokey (born May 8, 1950) is the Frederick Henry Prince Distinguished Service Professor Emeritus of Economics and the College at the University of Chicago and focuses particularly on mathematical economics while recently conducting research about Growth Theory, economic dynamics, and fiscal/monetary policy. She earned her BA in economics from the University of Pennsylvania in 1972 and her PhD from Harvard University in 1978, under the direction of thesis advisor Kenneth Arrow. She is a Fellow of the Econometric Society, the American Academy of Arts and Sciences and the National Academy of Sciences. She previously served as a co editor of Econometrica and was a member of the Expert Panel of the Copenhagen Consensus. She received her Honorary Doctor of Laws (L.L.D) in 2012 from the University of Western Ontario.

== Author ==
Stokey has published significant research in the areas of economic growth and development, as well as papers on economic history ("A Quantitative Model of the British Industrial Revolution: 1780–1850," 2001) and optimal control ("Dynamic Programming with Homogeneous Functions," 1998, co-authored with Fernando Alvarez). She is the co-developer, with Paul Milgrom, of the no-trade theorem, a counter-intuitive development of the premises of financial economics. She co-authored with Robert Lucas, Jr. and Edward Prescott a book on Recursive Methods in Economic Dynamics that is widely used by research economists and graduate students. Stokey worked with Paul Milgrom to publish "Information, Trade, and Common Knowledge" (1982), which established that information-based trade is not possible for rational agents with common knowledge. This work contributed to be one of the pillars of modern finance.

Stokey has also written articles that explain the "wait and see model", which describes investment decisions that firms who face a one-time tax policy will endure. As well as the author of The Economics of Inaction (2009) which treats models that involve fixed costs of adjustment.

Stokey has written critically about how the United Nations allocates funds for international economic development and humanitarian aid.

Stokey coauthored "Optimal Monetary and Fiscal Policy" which was one of the first papers to examine the time consistency of macroeconomic policy and to demonstrate the importance of central banks following rules.

Her recent research is on growth theory, economic dynamics, and fiscal and monetary policy. Her recent work include "Specific Technical Change, Trade Dynamics, and the Evolution of Skill Premia" and "Monetary Shocks in an Economy with Circulating Capital."

She is currently working on "Technology, Skill, and Long-Run Growth" (June 2017), "Technology, Skill, and the Wage Structure" (June 2017), "The Race Between Technology and The Human Capital" (2014), and "Liquidity Crises: Understanding Sources and Limiting Consequences" with Robert E. Lucas Jr.

== Professional experience ==
Stokey has taught and worked in various institutions. She was an economics professor at Northwestern University since 1978, from assistant professor to department chairman in 1987. She also taught economics as a visiting lecturer at Harvard University in the fall of 1982, at University of Minnesota in spring of 1983, and then at University of Chicago in 1983–1984. Since 1990, she has been teaching economics at University of Chicago. Aside from teaching, she was a visiting scholar of the Research Department at Federal Reserve Bank of Minneapolis for eight falls in the 2000s. She was awarded the 2021 CME Group - MSRI Prize.

== Memberships ==
Stokey is a member of the National Academy of Sciences and was a vice-president of the American Economic Association between 1996 and 1997. She has been a member of the American academy of Arts and Sciences since 1993, and a member of the National Academy of Sciences since 2004. She was also a member of the expert panel convened to produce a Copenhagen Consensus on some of the leading scientific/developmental problems of the 21st century. She has held editorial positions with top journals as Econometrica, The Journal of Economic Growth, Games and Economic Behavior and The Journal of Economic Theory. " She has made fundamental contributions in microeconomics, economic theory, finance, and in macroeconomics, with a particular focus on the impact of whether or not economic agents have commitment power."

She was married to Nobel Prize Winner in Economics laureate Robert Lucas Jr. until his death in 2023.

== Publications ==
- Stokey, Nancy, Robert Lucas and Edward Prescott (1989). Recursive Methods in Economic Dynamics. Harvard University Press. ISBN 978-0-674-75096-8.
- Stokey, Nancy & Paul Milgrom (1982). "Information, Trade and Common Knowledge" (PDF). Journal of Economic Theory. 26: 17–27. doi:10.1016/0022-0531(82)90046-1."Wait-and-See: Investment Options under Policy Uncertainty," Review of Economic Dynamics, 21 (2016), pp. 246–6
- "Wait-and-See: Investment Options under Policy Uncertainty," Review of Economic Dynamics, 21 (2016), pp. 246–65.
- "Catching Up and Falling Behind," Journal of Economic Growth, 20 (2015), pp. 1–36.
- "Introduction to Dynamic General Equilibrium," with Edward C. Prescott and Lee Ohanian, Journal of Economic Theory, 144 (6) (2009), pp. 2235–46.
- "Moving Costs, Nondurable Consumption, and Portfolio Choice," Journal of Economic Theory, 144 (6) (2009), pp. 2419–39.
- "A Two-Person Game of Information Transmission," with Jerry R. Green, Journal of Economic Theory, July 2007, pp. 90–104.
- "Giving Aid Effectively," 2005 Annual Report Issue of The Region, Federal Reserve Bank of Minneapolis.
- "'Rules versus Discretion' after Twenty-five Years," NBER Macroeconomics Annual 2002, pp. 9–45.
- "A Quantitative Model of the British Industrial Revolution, 1780-1850," Carnegie-Rochester Conference Series on Public Policy, 55 (2001), pp. 55–109.
- "Dynamic Programming with Homogeneous Functions," with Fernando Alvarez, Journal of Economic Theory, 82 (September 1998), pp. 167–189.
- "Shirtsleeves to Shirtsleeves: The Economics of Social Mobility," Frontiers of Research in Economic Theory: The Nancy L. Schwartz Memorial Lectures 1983-1997, D. Jacobs, E. Kalai, and M. Kamien, eds., Cambridge University Press, 1998.
- "Are There Limits to Growth?," International Economic Review, 39 (February 1998), pp. 1–31.
