= Robert Gibbons (economist) =

American economist

- Born: June 22, 1958 (age 67)

Academic background
- Education: Stanford Graduate School of Business; Cambridge University; Harvard University
- Doctoral advisor: David M. Kreps; Robert B. Wilson

Academic work
- Institutions: Massachusetts Institute of Technology
- Doctoral students: Pierre Azoulay, Daniel Barron, David Chan, Albert Choi, Florian Ederer, Nicola Lacetera, Michael Powell, Heikki Rantakari, Douglas Staiger
- Website: Information at IDEAS / RePEc

Robert S. Gibbons (born June 22, 1958) is an American economist, currently the Sloan Distinguished Professor of Management at Massachusetts Institute of Technology. He launched the Working Group on Organizational Economics at the National Bureau of Economic Research in 2002, and was its director until 2022.

== Education ==
- Ph.D. (Decision Sciences), Stanford Graduate School of Business, September 1985.
- M.Phil. (Economics, with honours), Cambridge University, June 1981.
- A.B. (Applied Mathematics, magna cum laude), Harvard University, June 1980.

== Selected publications ==
- "Robert Gibbons". Google Scholar.
- Gibbons, Robert (1992) Game Theory for Applied Economists, Princeton University Press (The non US version is A Primer in Game Theory)
