= Salary history bans =

Employment laws

Salary history bans refer to policies, adopted mostly in the United States, that ban employers from asking job candidates about their previous salaries. The purpose of these laws is the reduce the impact of historical discrimination. As of May 2024, twenty-two American states and twenty-three American municipalities have adopted some form of a salary history ban. The first salary history ban was passed in Massachusetts in August 2016.

Salary history bans forbid employers from asking candidates their salary histories. However, the bans do not forbid workers from volunteering their salaries. This raises the possibility of adverse selection, in which only workers with good salaries volunteer (and workers with bad salaries decline to answer). Voluntary disclosure also raises the possibility of unravelling, in which one person volunteering creates incentives for others to volunteer. In principle, this could lead to a full unravelling of salary history bans in which all workers disclose (despite the ban on employers asking).

Salary history bans have been found to be effective in reducing pay gap between men and women. Research suggests that these bans reduced the gender pay gap by 2 percentage points in states which have these bans in place.

The behavioral research in 2020 about salary disclosure behavior suggests that about 25% of job-seekers would volunteer their prior salaries, even if not asked, and that bans would partially (if not fully) unravel.
