= No-trade theorem =

Economic theorem

In financial economics, the no-trade theorem states that if

1. markets are in a state of efficient equilibrium
2. there are no noise traders or other non-rational interferences with prices
3. the structure by which traders or potential traders acquire information is itself common knowledge

then even though some traders may possess private information, none of them will be in a position to profit from it. The assumptions are deliberately unrealistic, but the theorem may nonetheless be pertinent to debates over inside information.

It was demonstrated by Paul Milgrom and Nancy Stokey in their 1982 paper, "Information, trade and common knowledge".

== Informal explanation ==
The idea behind the proof of the no-trade theorem is that if there is common knowledge about the structure of a market, then any bid or offer (i.e. attempt to initiate a trade) will reveal the bidder's private knowledge and will be incorporated into market prices even before anyone accepts the bid or offer, so no profit will result. Another way to put it is: all the traders in the market are rational, and thus they know that all the prices are rational/efficient; therefore, anyone who makes an offer to them must have special knowledge, else why would they be making the offer? Accepting the offer would make them a loser. All the traders will reason the same way, and thus will not accept any offers.

== See also ==
- Myerson–Satterthwaite theorem - a different theorem that predicts no trade in a strategic context.
