= Wilson doctrine (economics) =

Argument in economic theory

In economic theory, the Wilson doctrine (or Wilson critique) stipulates that game theory should not rely excessively on common knowledge assumptions. Most prominently, it is interpreted as a request for institutional designs to be "detail-free". That is, mechanism designers should offer solutions that do not depend on market details (such as distributions or functional forms of payoff relevant signals) because they may be unknown to practitioners or are subject to intractable change. The name is due to Nobel laureate Robert Wilson, who argued:

Game theory has a great advantage in explicitly analyzing the consequences of trading rules that presumably are really common knowledge; it is deficient to the extent it assumes other features to be common knowledge, such as one agent's probability assessment about another’s preferences or information. I foresee the progress of game theory as depending on successive reductions in the base of common knowledge required to conduct useful analyses of practical problems. Only by repeated weakening of common knowledge assumptions will the theory approximate reality.

While the above quote is often seen as the Wilson doctrine, mechanism design researchers derive an insistence on detail-free mechanisms from it. For instance, Partha Dasgupta and Eric Maskin, as well as Mark Satterthwaite and Steven Williams, attribute this insistence to Wilson. This interpretation might also go back to another paper by Wilson in which he praises the double auction because it "does not rely on features of the agents' common knowledge, such as their probability assessment". While Wilson himself agrees with the spirit of demanding detail-free mechanisms, he is surprised to be credited for it. In line with the above quote, Dirk Bergemann and Stephen Morris see the doctrine as a reminder of John Harsanyi's insight that common knowledge assumptions can be made explicit (and then relaxed) by enriching the type space with beliefs. This interpretation gave rise to their notion of robust mechanism design. An alternative approach to robust mechanism design assumes non-probabilistic uncertainty. For instance, Gabriel Carroll has a series of papers in which the principal evaluates outcomes on a worst-case basis.
