= Robert J. Weber =

American mathematician

Robert J. Weber (born April 1947) is the Frederic E. Nemmers Distinguished Professor of Decision Sciences at the J.L. Kellogg Graduate School of Management, Northwestern University.

== Biography ==
=== Education ===
Weber received his bachelor's degree in mathematics in 1969 from Princeton University, and both his MS in 1972 and Ph.D. in 1974 in operations research from Cornell University.

=== Career ===
Weber became a faculty member at Yale University, where he belonged to the Cowles Foundation for Research in Economics and the Yale School of Management. In 1979 he moved to Northwestern. Weber's general area of research is game theory, with a primary focus on the effects of private information in competitive settings. Much of his research has been centered on the theory and practice of competitive bidding and auction design. His 1982 paper, "A Theory of Auctions and Competitive Bidding", co-authored with Paul Milgrom, is considered a seminal work in the field. In that paper the authors analyzed auctions with interdependent values, and introduced the linkage principle. He served as an external consultant on a 1985 project leading to revisions in the procedures used to auction petroleum extraction leases on the U.S. outer continental shelf, and he co-organized (with representatives of the Federal Reserve Board and the U.S. Treasury) the 1992 public forum which led to changes in the way the Treasury auctions its debt issues. Since 1993, he has represented private clients during both the rule-making and bidding phases of the FCC's sale of licenses of spectrum for the provision of personal communications services.

In the early 1970s, Weber proposed an alternative to the traditional "plurality rule" for elections involving more than two candidates. This alternative, which he named "approval voting", a multi-candidate binary rating system of social choice, has generated a substantial body of research, has been adopted by a number of professional organizations, and has been used in several public elections. His later work in this area includes "A Theory of Voting Equilibria", co-authored with Roger Myerson. For a summary see "Approval Voting".

Weber has also conducted research on negotiation and arbitration. Among his activities have been preparation of a research survey for the American Arbitration Association, and development of classroom materials for the National Institute for Dispute Resolution. He is a founding member of the Center for Research on Dispute Resolution at Northwestern University, and has served on the editorial board of the International Journal of Game Theory. In 1990 he was designated the outstanding professor of the year by the students in Kellogg's Managers' Program, and in 1998 he received the Sidney J. Levy Teaching Award. In 2008, he was chosen as Alumni Professor of the Year.
