= Luís Cabral (economist) =

Economics professor (born 1961)

- Born: June 8, 1961 (age 65); Lisbon, Portugal

Academic background
- Education: Stanford University; Universidade Nova de Lisboa; Catholic University of Portugal
- Doctoral advisor: Paul Milgrom

Academic work
- Discipline: Industrial Organization
- Institutions: New York University

Luís Martins Barata Cabral (born June 8, 1961) is an economics professor at New York University. He is known for contributions to industrial organization.

== Education ==
Cabral received a B.A. in Economics from the Catholic University of Portugal in 1983, an M.Sc. in Economics from Universidade Nova de Lisboa in 1985, and a Ph.D. in Economics from Stanford University in 1989, working under the supervision of Paul Milgrom.

== Career ==
Cabral is the Paganelli-Bull Professor of Economics and International Business at New York University's Stern School of Business. He previously taught at IESE Business School, Yale University, University of California, Berkeley, London Business School and Universidade Nova de Lisboa. He has published over 40 papers in specialized economics journals and is the author of Introduction to Industrial Organization (MIT Press, 2000).

Cabral served as Managing Editor of the Journal of Industrial Economics from 1999-2003. He is currently Co-Editor of the Journal of Economics and Management Strategy and a member of the Advisory Board of the International Journal of Industrial Organization.

== Honors ==
Cabral was President of the European Association for Research in Industrial Economics from 2009-2011.
