= Per-Martin Meyerson =

Swedish economist, entrepreneur and policy maker

Per-Martin Meyerson (21 August 1927 in Stockholm, Sweden – 18 August 2013 in Dalhalla, Sweden), was a Swedish economist, an entrepreneur and a policy maker.

== Early career ==
After earning a PhD in economics at Stockholm University, Per-Martin Meyerson was recruited to the Swedish Federation of Industries – since 2001 merged into the Confederation of Swedish Enterprise – and worked as an economic expert and lobbyist. Dr Meyerson was a policy writer all his professional life. He participated in public debates on topics ranging from foreign direct investments, entrepreneurship, corporate governance, to topics such as the importance and significance of introducing computers; the arguments against the employee funds proposal (Swedish: Löntagarfonder), and the political economy of housing and agriculture.

== Later career ==
After his retirement, Per-Martin Meyerson devoted his time to writing about the modern Jewish experience. His publications include books about Jewish life in Europe, the history of the state of Israel, the importance of capitalism, humanism and liberalism for minority cultural groups such as the Jews. His last book A maverick's testament (In Swedish: En frisinnad vildes bokslut) was published posthumously in 2015.

== Policy articles ==
- 1976. Företagens utländska direktinvesteringar Ekonomisk Debatt, nr 7.
- 1981. Tar datorn bort jobben? Forskningsrådsnämnden och styrelsen för teknisk utveckling. Källa 14. LIBRIS 7755599.
- 1986. Livsmedelssektorns politiska ekonomi Svensk Tidskrift, nr 9.
- 1987. En borgerlig skattepolitik Svensk Tidskrift, nr 7–8.
- 1987. Economic Growth and Industrial Expansion and Renewal as Instruments to Achieve Full Employment Soc. Sci. Med. vol 25, no 2. pp. 205–207.
- 1991. Kan den svenska modellen räddas? Tiden, nr 6.
- 1994. Slut fred med kapitalismen Tiden, nr 1. LIBRIS 7622781.
- 1994. Företagsamhetens ekonomiska teori och politiska villkor – en explorativ betraktelse Ekonomisk Debatt, årg. 22, nr 2.
- 1995. Hur avlöna entreprenörer? Ekonomisk Debatt, årg 23, nr 3.
- 1995. Entreprenören och den ekonomiska tillväxten – fallet Sverige Ekonomisk Debatt, årg 23, nr 7.
- 1998. Skatterna skadar entreprenörernas kreativitet Skatter &Välfärd, nr 2, Skattebetalarnas förening, LIBRIS 4344017.
- 2000. Liberalism – en personlig betraktelse Liberal Debatt, nr 4.
- 2000. Kan vi lita på ekonomerna? Svensk Tidskrift, årg 87, nr 4.
- 2003. Om entreprenören i den svenska modellen Liberal Debatt, nr 1.

== Publication at the Swedish Federation of Industries ==
- 1976. Företagens utländska direktinvesteringar. Motiv och sysselsättningseffekter.
- 1976. Company profits: Sources of investment finance; Wage earner’s investment funds in Sweden: Proposals, debate, analysis. LIBRIS 127602.
- 1979. Swedish Economy at the Cross Roads. A critical examination of some recently published investigations of the Swedish economy. LIBRIS 7616215.
- 1981. Marknadsekonomin och löntagarfonderna. LIBRIS 7616253.
- 1981. Företagens utländska direktinvesteringar och samhällsekonomin. LIBRIS 7616248.
- 1982. The Welfare State in Crisis – the Case of Sweden. LIBRIS 7616261.
- 1985. EuroSclerosis. The Case of Sweden. LIBRIS 7616278.

== Centre for Business and Policy Studies, Briefs ==
- 1978. Industrins utveckling styr reallönerna ur Exit marknadsekonomin. Företag & Samhälle, Nr. 1. pp. 33–36. LIBRIS 593820.
- 1979. Ägarmakt på avskrivning? ISBN 91-7150-198-3, SNS förlag, Stockholm. LIBRIS 7609389.
- 1984. Makten över maten. Livsmedelssektorns politiska ekonomi, tillsammans med Olof Bolin och Ingemar Ståhl. ISBN 91-7150-257-2, SNS förlag, Stockholm. LIBRIS 7609441. In English translation: The political economy of the food sector. ISBN 91-7150-296-3, SNS förlag, Stockholm. LIBRIS 7609475.
- 1990. Makten över bostaden. Tillsammans med Ingemar Ståhl och Kurt Wickman. ISBN 91-7150-388-9, SNS förlag, Stockholm. LIBRIS 7609547.
- 1990. Svensk Bostadspolitik, Avveckla hyresregleringen. Företag & Samhälle, 4/90. LIBRIS 1188146.
- 1991. Den svenska modellens uppgång och fall. ISBN 91-7150-424-9, SNS förlag, Stockholm. LIBRIS 7609577.

== Books ==
- 1978. Löntagarfonder eller… ISBN 91-1-787171-9 P A Norstedts och Söners förlag. LIBRIS 8345602.
- 1997. Sockerbagare i doktorshatt: en självbiografi ISBN 91-7054-847-1 Stockholm: Fischer & Co. LIBRIS 7596570.
- 2002. På jakt efter den judiska anden: en resa i judisk historia ISBN 91-7054-966-4 Stockholm: Fischer & Co. LIBRIS 8741896.
- 2005. Staten Israel. Drömmar och verklighet ISBN 91-975223-0-9 Sekel förlag. LIBRIS 10006882.
- 2009. Gud & Mammon. Om religion, kapitalism och liberalism i ett judiskt perspektiv ISBN 978-91-85767-34-2 Stockholm: Sekel Bokförlag. LIBRIS 11284987.
- 2012. Judiskt liv i Europa 1786–1933. Integrationsprocess med förhinder ISBN 978-91-7504-251-0 Stockholm: Dialogos. LIBRIS 12744965.
- 2015. En frisinnad vildes bokslut ISBN 9789163797699 Författares Bokmaskin. Posthumousley published. LIBRIS 19095650.
