= Paul Milgrom =

American economist (born 1948)

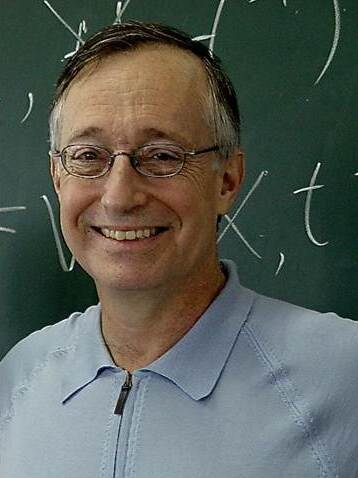
- Milgrom in 2013
- Born: April 20, 1948 (age 78); Detroit, Michigan, U.S.
- Known for: Auction theory Incentive theory Market design
- Spouse: Eva Meyersson

Academic background
- Education: University of Michigan (BA); Stanford University (MS, PhD)
- Thesis: The structure of information in competitive bidding (1979)
- Doctoral advisor: Robert B. Wilson

Academic work
- Discipline: Economics
- Institutions: Northwestern University (1979–1983); Yale University (1982–1987); Stanford University (1987–present)
- Doctoral students: Susan Athey; Luís Cabral; Joshua Gans; Gillian Hadfield; Li Shengwu
- Awards: Erwin Plein Nemmers Prize in Economics (2008); BBVA Foundation Frontiers of Knowledge Award (2012); Golden Goose Award (2014); Nobel Memorial Prize in Economic Sciences (2020) Technology and Engineering Emmy Awards (2024)
- Website: Information at IDEAS / RePEc

Paul Robert Milgrom (born April 20, 1948) is an American economist. He is the Shirley and Leonard Ely Professor of Humanities and Sciences at the Stanford University School of Humanities and Sciences, a position he has held since 1987. He is a professor in the Stanford School of Engineering as well and a Senior Fellow at the Stanford Institute for Economic Research. Milgrom is an expert in game theory, specifically auction theory and pricing strategies. He is the winner of the 2020 Nobel Memorial Prize in Economic Sciences, together with Robert B. Wilson, "for improvements to auction theory and inventions of new auction formats".

He is the co-creator of the no-trade theorem with Nancy Stokey. He is the co-founder of several companies, the most recent of which, Auctionomics, provides software and services for commercial auctions and exchanges.

Milgrom and his thesis advisor Wilson designed the auction protocol the FCC uses to determine which phone company gets what cellular frequencies. Milgrom also led the team that designed the broadcast incentive auction between 2016 and 2017, which was a two-sided auction to reallocate radio frequencies from TV broadcast to wireless broadband uses.

In 2024, Milgrom's firm, Auctionomics, won a technical Emmy Award for their contributions to spectrum auction design.

== Early life and education ==
Paul Milgrom was born in Detroit, Michigan, April 20, 1948, the second of four sons to Jewish parents Abraham Isaac Milgrom and Anne Lillian Finkelstein. His family moved to Oak Park, Michigan, and Milgrom attended the Dewey Elementary School and then Oak Park High School. Milgrom had a strong interest in math from a young age, which was fostered by his teachers. He attended the Ross summer math camp at Ohio State University in 1965, where he finished number one in his class.

Milgrom graduated from the University of Michigan in 1970 with a B.A. in mathematics. He worked as an actuary for several years in San Francisco at the Metropolitan Insurance Company and then at the Nelson and Warren consultancy in Columbus, Ohio. Milgrom became a Fellow of the Society of Actuaries in 1974. In 1975, Milgrom enrolled for graduate studies at Stanford University and earned an M.S. in statistics in 1978 and a Ph.D. in business in 1979.

== Academic career ==
Milgrom assumed a teaching position at the Kellogg School of Management at Northwestern University where he served from 1979 to 1983. At Northwestern, Milgrom was part of a group of professors including future Nobel laureates Roger Myerson and Bengt Holmstrom, along with Nancy Stokey, Robert J. Weber, John Roberts and Mark Satterthwaite that helped to bring game theory and information economics to bear on a wide range of problems in economics such as pricing, auctions, financial markets, and industrial organization.

Weber recounted his collaboration with Milgrom. During what was supposed to be a brief meeting to ponder a problem faced by Weber, Milgrom had a key insight. Weber wrote, "And there, in a matter of a few minutes, was the heart of our first two joint papers."

From 1982 to 1987, Milgrom was a professor of economics and management at Yale University. In 1987, Milgrom returned as an economics professor to his alma mater, Stanford University, where he is currently the Shirley and Leonard Ely Professor of Humanities and Sciences in the Department of Economics.

Milgrom held editorial positions at the American Economic Review, Econometrica and the Journal of Economic Theory. He became a Fellow of the Econometric Society in 1984, and the American Academy of Arts and Sciences in 1992. In 1996, he gave the Nobel memorial lecture honoring the laureate William Vickrey, who had died three days after the Nobel prize announcement. In 2006, Milgrom was elected to the National Academy of Sciences.

=== Awards and honors ===
Milgrom received the Erwin Plein Nemmers Prize in Economics in 2008 "for contributions dramatically expanding the understanding of the role of information and incentives in a variety of settings, including auctions, the theory of the firm, and oligopolistic markets."

He won the 2012 BBVA Foundation Frontiers of Knowledge Award in Economy, Finance and Management category "for his seminal contributions to an unusually wide range of fields of economics including auctions, market design, contracts and incentives, industrial economics, economics of organizations, finance, and game theory."

In 2013, Milgrom was elected as Vice President of the American Economic Association. In 2014, he won a Golden Goose Award for his work involving auction design. In 2017, he won the CME Group-MSRI Prize in Innovative Quantitative Applications for his work in auction design. In 2020, he was appointed a Distinguished Fellow of the American Economic Association.

In October 2020, Milgrom was the co-recipient of the 2020 Nobel Memorial Prize in Economic Sciences with Robert B. Wilson. The Royal Swedish Academy of Sciences stated that it awarded the Nobel Memorial Prize jointly to Milgrom and Wilson because they "used their insights to design new auction formats for goods and services that are difficult to sell in a traditional way, such as radio frequencies. Their discoveries have benefitted sellers, buyers and taxpayers around the world." The citation went on to say:

=== Game theory ===
Milgrom made several fundamental contributions to game theory in the 1980s and 1990s on topics including the game-theoretic analysis of reputation formation, repeated games, supermodular games and learning in games.

==== Reputation formation ====
In an influential 1982 paper with David M. Kreps, John Roberts, and Robert B. Wilson (Kreps et.al., 1982), Milgrom showed that if one or both players have even a very small probability of being committed to playing tit-for-tat, then in equilibrium both players cooperate until the last few periods. This is because even an uncommitted player has an incentive to "build a reputation" for being committed to tit-for-tat, as doing so makes the other player want to cooperate. The Kreps-Milgrom-Roberts-Wilson "Gang of Four" paper launched an entire branch of the game theory literature on such "reputation effects."

==== Distributional strategies ====
Milgrom's 1985 paper with Robert J. Weber on distributional strategies showed the general existence of equilibria for a Bayesian game with finitely many players, if the players' sets of types and actions are compact metric spaces, the players' payoffs are continuous functions of the types and actions, and the joint distribution of the players' types is absolutely continuous with respect to the product of their marginal distributions. These basic assumptions are always satisfied if the sets of types and actions are finite.

==== Repeated games ====
Milgrom made a fundamental contribution to the theory of repeated games. When players' actions are hidden and noisy signals about their actions are observable (i.e., in the case of imperfect monitoring), there are two general ways to achieve efficiency. One way is to transfer future payoffs from one player to others. This is a way to punish a potential deviator without reducing the total future payoffs. The classical folk theorem result under imperfect monitoring is built on this idea. The second general method is to delay the release of information. Under the second method, the outcomes of the noisy signals are released in every T periods, and upon the release of information players "review" the signals in the last T periods and decide to punish or reward each other. This is now widely known as the "review strategy", and Milgrom's paper with D. Abreu and D. Pearce (Abreu, Milgrom and Pearce, 1991) was the first to show the efficiency of review strategy equilibrium in discounted repeated games. The review strategy turns out to be useful when players receive private signals about each other's actions (the case of private monitoring), and the folk theorem for the private monitoring case is built on the idea of the review strategy.

==== Supermodular games ====
The theory of supermodular games is an important recent developments in economic theory. Key contributions to this theory include seminal work Topkis's Theorem, Vives (1990), and the Milgrom and Roberts (1990c).

The impact and importance of the theory of supermodular games came from its breadth of application, including search, technology adoption, bank runs, arms races, pretrial negotiations, two-player Cournot competition, N-player Bertrand competition, and oil exploration, and the economics of organizations (Milgrom and Roberts, 1990b).

==== Learning in games ====
Milgrom and Roberts build on their work in supermodular games to understand the processes by which strategic agents reach equilibrium in a normal-form game. In Milgrom and Roberts (1991), they proposed two learning processes each with a degree of generality so as to not model learning but learning processes. They considered a sequence of plays over time which, for a player n, is denoted {x_{n}(t)} where for each possible time, t, x_{n}(t) is a pure strategy. Given this, an observed sequence, {x_{n}(t)}, is consistent with adaptive learning if a player n eventually chooses only strategies that are nearly best-replies to some probability distribution over the joint strategies of other players (with near zero probability being assigned to strategies that have not been played for a sufficiently long time). By contrast, {x_{n}(t)}, is consistent with sophisticated learning if the player eventually chooses only nearly best-replies to their probabilistic forecast of the choices of other players, where the support of that probability distribution may include not only past plays but also strategies that the players might choose if they themselves were adaptive or sophisticated learners. Thus, a sequence consistent with adaptive learning is also consistent with sophisticated learning. Sophisticated learning allows players to make use of payoff information that is used in equilibrium analysis but does not impose the fulfilled expectations requirement of equilibrium analysis.

With these definitions in place, Milgrom and Roberts showed that if a sequence converges to a Nash equilibrium or correlated equilibrium then it is consistent with adaptive learning. This gave a certain generality to those processes. They then showed how these processes related to the elimination of dominated strategies. This was shown to have implications for convergence in Cournot and Bertrand games.

=== Comparative statics ===
Milgrom's research has often highlighted the restrictiveness (and often superfluity) of these assumptions in economic applications. For example, in the study of modern manufacturing (Milgrom and Roberts, 1990b), one would like to focus on the complementarity or substitutability across production inputs, without making assumptions on scale economies or divisibility (through a concavity condition on the production function).

Monotonic relationships, in which more of one quantity would imply more of another, are found pervasively in economic analysis. Milgrom pioneered in the development of new mathematical methods for understanding monotonic relationships in economics. His work on auctions with Robert Weber introduced the concept of affiliation of random variables, to indicate systems of unknown quantities where learning that any one of them is higher than some given level would cause beliefs about others to be higher. His work with John Roberts and Chris Shannon advanced the use of supermodularity as a property of individuals' preferences that can yield general monotonicity results in economic analysis.

The work of Milgrom and Shannon (1994) showed that comparative statics results could often be obtained through more relevant and intuitive ordinal conditions. Indeed, they show that their concept of quasi-supermodularity (a generalization of supermodular function) along with the single-crossing property, is necessary and sufficient for comparative statics to obtain on arbitrary choice sets. Their theory extends earlier work in the Operations Research literature (Topkis, 1968; Veinott, 1989) which already uses lattice theory but focuses on cardinal concepts. Milgrom and John Roberts (1994) extended this to comparative statics on equilibria, while Milgrom (1994) demonstrated its wider applicability in comparing optima. Milgrom and Roberts (1996) also generalized Paul Samuelson's application of Le Chatelier's Principle in economics. In related work, Milgrom and Ilya Segal (2002) reconsidered the envelope theorem and its applications in light of the developments in monotone comparative statics. Due to the influence of Milgrom and Shannon's paper and related research by Milgrom and others, these techniques, now often referred to as monotone comparative statics, are widely known and used in economic modelling.

The single-crossing property as reformulated by Milgrom and Shannon was subsequently shown by Joshua Gans and Michael Smart not only to resolve Condorcet's Voting paradox in majority voting and social choice theory but also to give rise to a complete characterization of social preferences. Susan Athey extended these results to consider economic problems with uncertainty.

Writing in 1994 on the comparative statics and theoretical modeling, Milgrom relates a theorem that would demonstrate when a result with a specific functional form may easily generalize, and notes:

These conclusions do not mean that functional form assumptions are either useless or inconsequential for economic analysis. Functional form assumptions may be helpful for deriving explicit formulas for empirical estimation or simulations or simply to lend insight into the problem structure, and they certainly can help determine the magnitude of comparative statics effects. But with economic knowledge at its current state, functional form assumptions are never really convincing, and this lends importance to the question I ask and to its answer: One can indeed often draw valid general comparative statics inferences from special cases.

. ... these results suggest that comparative statics conclusions obtained in models with special simplifying assumptions can often be significantly generalized. The theorems help to distinguish the critical assumptions of an analysis from the other assumptions that simplify calculations but do not alter the qualitative comparative statics conclusions. In that way, the theorems improve our ability to develop useful models of parts of the economy and to interpret those models accurately.

=== Market design ===
Milgrom describes Market Design this way:

Market design is a kind of economic engineering, utilizing laboratory research, game theory, algorithms, simulations, and more. Its challenges inspire us to rethink longstanding fundamentals of economic theory.

His work comprises three broad theoretical and practical efforts in the field: auction theory and matching theory, and simplifying participants' message.

=== Organizational and information economics ===
==== Agency theory ====
Milgrom, together with Bengt Holmstrom, asked what features of a contracting problem would give rise to a simpler, say, linear, incentive scheme (that is, a scheme in which the wage consisted of a base amount plus amounts that were directly proportional to specific performance measures). Previously, most theoretical papers in agency theory assumed that the main problem was to provide an incentive for an agent to exert more effort on just one activity. But in many situations, agents can actually exert unobservable efforts on several different activities. In such contexts, new kinds of incentive problems can arise, since giving an agent more incentive to exert effort on one dimension could cause the agent to neglect other important dimensions. Holmstrom and Milgrom believed that incorporating this multi-dimensional feature of incentive problems would generate implications for optimal incentive design that were more relevant for real world contracting problems.

In their 1987 paper, Holmstrom and Milgrom introduced new techniques for studying multidimensional agency problems. The key insight in the Holmstrom-Milgrom paper is that simple linear incentive schemes can become optimal when the agent can monitor the evolution over time of the performance measures on which his compensation will be based. In that paper, an agent continuously chooses the drift of an N-dimensional Brownian motion, contingent on observing the whole history of the process. Under some assumptions on the agent's utility function, it is shown that the optimal compensation scheme for the principal specifies a payment to the agent that is a linear function of the time-aggregates of the performance measures. Such a linear compensation scheme imposes a "uniform incentive pressure" on the agent, leading him to choose a constant drift for each dimension of the Brownian process.

Having demonstrated that the optimal incentive contract in a dynamic principal-agent problem will be linear in certain environments, Holmstrom and Milgrom then used linear contracts to explore in more detail what happens when agents allocate their efforts or attention across multiple tasks. Prior to 1991, models had generally considered effort on a single task. To reward performance on a single task, a principal can either reward performance (or some measure of it) or change the agent's opportunity cost of performing that task. This second strategy is key to understanding what happens when an agent has more than one task to which he can allocate effort, because increasing the reward on one task will generally alter the agent's opportunity cost of allocating effort to other tasks, increasing it when the tasks are substitutes for the agent and decreasing it when the tasks are complements. Holmstrom and Milgrom's (1991) paper demonstrates that when tasks are substitutes for the agent and it is difficult to measure performance on one of them, it may be optimal to have low-powered incentives, or even no incentives, on all tasks, even if some can be easily measured. They also demonstrated that the difficulties of providing incentives on multiple tasks have implications for the design of jobs. For instance, it may be better to split conflicting tasks between agents or to vary the intensity of monitoring and communication. Finally, in their 1994 paper, Holmstrom and Milgrom broadened the scope of their analysis to include not only performance-related pay but also other management choices that affect agents' incentives, such as choices about how much discretion to give agents and about whether or not agents own the assets with which they work. This paper stressed the interactions (the "complementarities") between these different choices, showing that the optimal choices for the principal will often vary together as the contracting environment changes. Holmstrom recounted the impact of this work at the Nemmers Conference in Honor of Paul Milgrom.

Holmstrom and Milgrom (1991) anticipated an important aspect of the debate in education on the issue of teacher pay and incentives. In considering incentive pay for teachers based on student test scores, they wrote:

Proponents of the system, guided by a conception very like the standard one-dimensional incentive model, argue that these incentives will lead teachers to work harder at teaching and to take greater interest in their students' success. Opponents counter that the principal effect of the proposed reform would be that teachers would sacrifice such activities as promoting curiosity and creative thinking and refining students' oral and written communication skills in order to teach the narrowly defined basic skills that are tested on standardised exams. It would be better, these critics argue, to pay a fixed what without any incentive scheme than to base teachers' compensation only on the limited dimensions of student achievement that can be effectively measured. (Emphasis in original).

This work was mentioned in the New York Times in 2011

Too much pressure to improve students' test scores can reduce attention to other aspects of the curriculum and discourage cultivation of broader problem-solving skills, also known as "teaching to the test." The economists Bengt Holmstrom and Paul Milgrom describe the general problem of misaligned incentives in more formal terms – workers who are rewarded only for accomplishment of easily measurable tasks reduce the effort devoted to other tasks.

==== Information economics ====
In Milgrom (1981), Milgrom introduced into economics a new notion of "favorableness" for information; namely, that one observation x is more favorable than another observation y, if, for all prior beliefs about the variable of interest, the posterior belief conditional on x first-order stochastically dominates the posterior conditional on y. Milgrom and others have used this notion of favorableness and the associated "monotone likelihood ratio property" of information structures to derive a range of important results in information economics, from properties of the optimal incentive contract in a principal-agent problem, to the notion of the winner's curse in auction theory.

In the same paper, Milgrom introduced a novel "persuasion game", in which a salesperson has private information about a product, which he can, if he chooses, verifiably report to a potential buyer. (That is, the salesperson can, if he wishes, conceal his information, but he cannot misreport it if he reveals it.) Milgrom demonstrates that, with substantial generality, at every sequential equilibrium of the sales encounter game, the salesperson employs a strategy of full disclosure. This result has come to be known as the "unraveling result," because Milgrom shows that, in any candidate equilibrium in which the buyer expects the salesperson to conceal some observations, the salesperson will have an incentive to reveal the most favorable (to himself) of those observations---thus, any strategy of concealment will "unravel". In a subsequent paper (1986), Milgrom and John Roberts observed that when there is competition among informed, self-interested agents to persuade an uninformed party, all of the relevant information may be disclosed in equilibrium even if the uninformed party (e.g. the buyer) is not as sophisticated as was assumed in the analysis with a single informed agent (e.g. the salesperson).

The unraveling result has implications for a wide variety of situations in which individuals can strategically choose whether to conceal information, but in which lying carries substantial penalties. An empirical application is to recent laws limiting salary history questions by employers. Behavioral research suggests that about 25% of job-seekers would volunteer their prior salaries, even if not asked, and that bans would partially (if not fully) unravel. Other applications of unravelling include courtroom battles, regulation of product testing, and financial disclosure. Milgrom's persuasion game has been hugely influential in the study of financial accounting as a tool for understanding the strategic response of management to changes in disclosure regulation. This work has led to a large literature on strategic communication and information revelation.

==== Organizational economics ====
In the late 1980s, Milgrom began working with John Roberts to apply ideas from game theory and incentive theory to the study of organizations. Early on in this research, they focused on the importance of complementarities in organizational design. Activities in an organization are complementary, or synergistic, when there is a return to coordination. For example, a company that wants to make frequent changes in its production process will benefit from training workers in a flexible manner that allows them to adapt to these changes.

Milgrom and Roberts first came on the ideas and applicability of complements when studying an enriched version of the classic news vendor problem of how to organize production that allowed both make to order after learning demand and make to stock (Milgrom and Roberts, 1988). The problem they formulated turned out to be a convex maximization problem, so the solutions were end points, not interior optima where first derivatives were zero. So the Hicks-Samuelson methods for comparative statics were not applicable. Yet they got rich comparative statics results. This led Milgrom to recall the work of Topkis (1968), particularly Topkis's theorem, which led to their development and application of complementarity ideas in many spheres. The incorporation of these methods into economics, discussed below, has proved very influential.

In perhaps their most famous paper on organizations, (Milgrom and Roberts, 1990b) Milgrom and Roberts used comparative statics methods to describe the development of "modern manufacturing," characterized by frequent product redesigns and improvements, higher production quality, speedier communication and order processing, smaller batch sizes, and lower inventories. Subsequently, Milgrom and Bengt Holmstrom (1994), used similar methods to identify complementarities in incentive design. They argued that the use of high-intensity performance incentives would be complementary to placing relatively few restrictions on workers and decentralizing asset ownership.

In an influential paper, Milgrom and Roberts (1994) applied the framework of thinking about change of a system of complements to tackle some key issues in organizational economics. They noted that when organizations adapt by changing one element in a complementary system, it can often be the case that performance will degrade. This will make change a hard sell within organizations. Milgrom and Roberts suggested that this is why businesses had been unable to replicate Lincoln Electric's performance incentive system because the classic piece rate contract was supported by a string of human resource policies (e.g., subjective bonuses, lifetime employment) as well as production management policies (including organizational slack on delivery), and, perhaps most importantly, deep trust between workers and management. Thus, successful replication would require getting all of these elements in place. Milgrom and Roberts used the same theory to forecast the difficulties Japanese businesses would have in adjusting to change in the decade and a half following the recession that began in the early 1990s; a prediction that was borne out by subsequent experience.

In a series of papers, Milgrom studied the problem of lobbying and politicking, or "influence activities" that occur in large organizations. These papers considered models in which employees are affected by post-hiring decisions. When managers have discretion over these decisions, employees have incentives to spend time attempting to influence the outcomes. Since this time could instead be spent on productive tasks, influence activities are costly for the firm. Milgrom shows that firms may limit the discretion of managers in order to avoid these costs (Milgrom, 1988). In a paper with John Roberts, Milgrom also studied a model in which employees have information that is valuable to the decision maker. As a result, allowing some degree of influence is beneficial, but excessive influence is costly. Milgrom and Roberts compare various strategies that firms might use to discourage excessive influence activities, and they show that typically, limiting employees' access to decision makers and altering decision-making criteria are preferable to the use of explicit financial incentives (Milgrom and Roberts, 1988). In another paper, with Margaret Meyer and Roberts (1992), Milgrom studied the influence costs that arise in multiunit firms. They demonstrate that managers of underperforming units have incentives to exaggerate the prospects of their unit in order to protect their jobs. If the unit were embedded in a firm whose other units were more closely related, there would be a lower threat of layoffs, because reassignment of workers could occur instead. Similarly, if the unit were independent, there would many fewer opportunities to misrepresent its prospects. These arguments help explain why divestitures of underperforming units occur so frequently and why, when such units do not become stand-alone firms, they are often purchased by buyers operating in related lines of business.

In 1992, Milgrom and Roberts published their textbook on organizations, Economics, Organization and Management. The book covers a wide range of topics in the theory of organizations using modern economic theory. It is Milgrom's most cited work, a remarkable fact, given that it is a textbook aimed at undergraduates and masters students, while Milgrom has so many highly influential, widely cited research papers. In addition to discussing incentive design and complementarities, the book discusses some of the inefficiencies that can arise in large organizations, including the problem of lobbying or "influence costs." In the 2008 Nemmers Prize conference, Roberts commented that the impact of the work on influence on management scholarship had exceeded its impact on economic scholarship.

=== Industrial organization ===
In a series of three seminal papers, Milgrom and Roberts developed some of the central ideas regarding asymmetric information in the context of industrial organization. The work of George Akerlof, Joseph Stiglitz, and especially Michael Spence, mostly developed in the 1970s, provides some of the conceptual and methodological background. However, it was primarily in the 1980s and largely due to the Milgrom-Roberts contributions in applying incomplete information game theory to industrial organization problems that these ideas were adopted into the mainstream of the field.

Consider first the case of predatory pricing. For a long time, McGee's (1958) analysis, frequently associated with the Chicago school, provided the only coherent economic perspective regarding the main issues. McGee (1958) argued that the concept of predatory pricing lacks logical consistency. His idea is that, in addition to the prey, the predator too suffers from predatory pricing. If the prey resists predation and remains active, then the predator eventually will give up its efforts. Anticipating this outcome, the prey is indeed better off by resisting predatory efforts. Anticipating this outcome, in turn, the alleged predator is better off by refraining from its predatory strategy. Even if the alleged prey were short of cash, it could always borrow from a bank with the (correct) promise that its losses are only temporary. Further, supposing the predation were successful in inducing exit, if the predator subsequently raised prices to enjoy the fruits of its victory, new entry could be attracted, and the problem starts all over.

Milgrom and Roberts (1982a), as well as Kreps and Wilson (1982), provide a novel perspective on the issue. Methodologically, this perspective is based on the concept of reputation developed by Kreps, Milgrom, Roberts and Wilson (1982), where reputation is understood as the Bayesian posterior that uninformed agents (e.g., an entrant) hold about the type of an informed agent (e.g., an incumbent). Suppose that, with some small probability, an incumbent may be "irrational" to the point of always fighting entry (even if this is not a profit maximizing reaction to entry). In this context, by repeatedly fighting rivals with low prices, a predator increases its reputation for "toughness"; and thus encourages exit and discourages future entry.

If Kreps, Milgrom, Roberts and Wilson (1982) effectively created a novel economic theory of reputation, Milgrom and Roberts (1982a), as well as Kreps and Wilson (1982), provided a first application to an outstanding issue of central importance in industrial organization theory and policy (predatory pricing).

Appendix A in Milgrom and Roberts (1982a) proposes an alternative theory for equilibrium predatory pricing, that is, an alternative response to McGee's (1958) Chicago school criticism. In this appendix, Milgrom and Roberts examine an infinite horizon version of Selten's chain-store model (with complete information) and demonstrate the existence of an equilibrium where any attempted entry is met by predation — and thus entry does not take place in equilibrium.

Returning to the issue of information asymmetry between incumbent and entrant, Milgrom and Roberts (1982b) consider the alternative case when the entrant is uncertain about the incumbent's costs. In this case, they show that the incumbent's low prices signal that its costs are low too, and so are the target's long term prospects from entry. Like Milgrom and Roberts (1982a), this paper brought formal understanding to an old idea in industrial organization, this time the concept of limit pricing. In the process of doing so, the paper also uncovered new results of interest. In particular, Milgrom and Roberts (1982b) show that the equilibrium entry rate may actually increase when asymmetric information is introduced.

Finally, Milgrom and Roberts (1986) bring the asymmetric information framework to bear in analyzing the issue of advertising and pricing. Traditionally, economists have thought of advertising as being either informative (as for example classified ads, which describe the characteristics of the product for sale), or persuasive (as for example many television commercials which seem to provide little or no information about a product's characteristics). Following earlier ideas by Nelson (1970, 1974), Milgrom and Roberts (1986) show that even "uninformative" advertising, that is, advertising expenditures that provide no direct information about a product's characteristics, may be informative in equilibrium to the extent that they work as a signal of the advertiser's quality level. Methodologically, Milgrom and Roberts (1986) also make an important contribution: the study of signaling equilibria when the informed party has more than one available signal (price and advertising, in the present case).

=== Law, institutions and economic history ===
Milgrom made early contributions to the growing literature applying game theoretic models to our understanding of the evolution of the legal institutions of the market economy. Milgrom, Douglass North and Barry Weingast (1990) presents a repeated game model that shows the role for a formal institution that serves as a repository of judgments about contract behavior to coordinate a multilateral reputation mechanism. Milgrom and his co-authors argued that this model sheds light on the development of the Law Merchant, an institution of late medieval trade in Europe, whereby merchants looked to the judgments of the Law Merchant to decide what counted as "cheating." In their model, merchants query the Law Merchant to determine whether a potential trading partner has cheated on prior contracts, triggering the application of punishment by other merchants. The incentive to punish in this model arises from the structure of the repeated game, assumed to be a prisoners' dilemma, where cheating is the dominant strategy and the only incentive not to cheat is because future partners can learn of this and cheating a cheater is not punishable; this makes the equilibrium sub-game perfect. Understanding the merchants' incentives to create an institution to support decentralized contract enforcement like this helps to overcome the tendency in the law and economics and positive political theory literatures to assume that the role of law is exclusively attributable to the capacity to take advantage of centralized enforcement mechanisms such as state courts and police power.

In a further contribution in this area, Milgrom, together with Barry Weingast and Avner Greif, applied a repeated game model to explain the role of merchant guilds in the medieval period (Greif, Milgrom and Weingast, 1994). The paper beings with the observation that long-distance trade in the somewhat chaotic environment of the Middle Ages exposed traveling merchants to the risk of attack, confiscation of goods and unenforced agreements. Merchants thus required the assistance of local rulers for protection of person, property and contract. But what reason did rulers have to provide this assistance? A key insight from the paper is that neither bilateral nor multilateral reputation mechanisms can support the incentives of a ruler to protect foreign merchants as trade reaches an efficient level. The reason is that at the efficient level the marginal value of losing the trade of a single or even a subset of merchants—in their attempt to punish a defaulting ruler—approaches zero. The threat is, thus, insufficient to deter a ruler from confiscating goods or to encourage their expenditure of resources or political capital to defend foreign merchants against local citizens. Effective punishment that will deter rulers' bad behavior requires more extensive coordination of effectively all the merchants who provide value for the ruler. The question then becomes, what incentives do the merchants have to participate in the collective boycott? Here is the role for the Merchant Guild, an organization that has the power to punish its own members for failure to abide by a boycott announced by the guild.

These insights have been built on to explore more generally the role of legal institutions in coordinating and incentivizing decentralized enforcement mechanisms like the multilateral reputation system.

Milgrom's contribution to the understanding of legal institutions also includes one of the early express analyses of the functioning of adjudicatory institutions. In Milgrom and Roberts (1986b) the authors explore the role of strategic revelation in an adjudicatory setting. They show that the core notion that adversarial litigation will lead to the truth is true if the parties are symmetrically informed and both have access to verifiable evidence that demonstrates the truth and so long as one of the parties prefers the decision that even a naive decisionmaker (who chooses from a set of decisions suggested by the parties) will reach under full information to the alternative under partial information. They also show, building on Milgrom (1981c) and Grossman (1981) that a decisionmaker can induce parties with less than complete information to reveal enough to ultimately result in full revelation by adopting a skeptical posture, drawing sufficiently negative inferences from weak or non-existent evidentiary showings. This early model laid the groundwork for future work on strategic information behavior in courts Shin (1998) and Daughter and Reinganum (2000) relax the symmetry assumption, for example, looking at the impact of sequential evidentiary search decisions or Bayesian inference by judges; Froeb and Kobayashi (1996) and Farmer and Pecorino (2000) investigate the role of evidentiary costs and alternative models of judicial inference; Che and Severinov (2009) explore a role for lawyers who are better informed about the legal significance of evidence and can advise their clients about to reveal in court. This important literature sheds light on the impact of legal rules governing discovery and attorney-client privilege as well as the function of lawyers in adjudicatory systems.

=== Finance and macroeconomics ===
==== Securities markets ====
Milgrom and Stokey (1982) addressed an important question about why people trade securities and whether one can profit from speculation. The famous no-trade theorem in this paper showed that if traders have the same prior beliefs and trading motives are purely speculative, then no trading should happen. This is because all traders correctly interpret the information reflected by the equilibrium prices and expect other people to trade rationally; as a result, an uninformed trader anticipates that he would incur a loss if he traded with an informed trader so would be better off not trading.

"Why do traders bother to gather information if they cannot profit from it? How does information come to be reflected in prices if informed traders do not trade or if they ignore their private information in making inferences?" These questions, asked at the end of Milgrom and Stokey (1982), were addressed in Glosten and Milgrom (1985). In this seminal paper, the authors provided a dynamic model of the price formation process in securities markets and an information-based explanation for the spread between the bid and ask prices. Because informed traders have better information than market-makers, market-makers incur a loss when trading with informed traders. Market-makers use the bid-ask spread to recoup this loss from uninformed traders, who have private reasons for trading, for example, because of liquidity needs. This dynamic trading model with asymmetric information has been one of the workhorse models in the literature on market microstructure.

Trading on stock exchanges had been growing at a growing rate in the 1960s, 70s and 80s, which led Milgrom and coauthors (Bresnahan, Milgrom and Paul 1992) to ask whether the rapid increase of trading volume also brings rapid increase of the real output of stock exchanges. Traders in this model make profit by gathering information of the value of the firm and trading its stocks. However, information valuable for making a real decision on the firm is the value added rather than the value of the firm. Their analysis suggests that the increased trading activity increased the resources devoted to rent-seeking, without improving real investment decisions.

At the 2008 Nemmers Prize conference, Stephen Morris provided an explanation of Milgrom's contributions to the understanding of financial markets as well as of the impact that they have had on financial analysis.

==== Labor markets ====
In 1987, Milgrom with Sharon Oster examined imperfections in labor markets. They evaluated the "Invisibility Hypothesis" which held that disadvantaged workers had difficult signalling their job skills to potential new employers because their existing employers denied them promotions that would improve visibility. Milgrom and Oster found that, in a competitive equilibrium, such invisibility could be profitable for firms. This led to less pay to disadvantaged workers in lower-level positions even when they otherwise had the same education and ability as their more advantaged co-workers. Not surprisingly, the returns to investing in education and human capital were reduced for those in disadvantaged groups; reinforcing discriminatory outcomes in labor markets.

Two decades later, Milgrom, in a paper with Bob Hall (Hall and Milgrom, 2008), contributed to macroeconomics directly. Macroeconomic models, including real business cycle models, efficiency wage models and search/matching models, have long had difficulty accounting for the observed volatility in labor market variables. In an influential paper, Shimer explained the problem as it appears in the standard search/matching model, an important macroeconomic model for which the Nobel prize was recently granted to Diamond, Mortensen and Pissarides (DMP). Shimer explained that in the standard DMP model, a shock that raises the value of what firms sell – other things the same – increases their incentive to hire workers by raising profits per worker. The problem, according to Shimer is that this mechanism sets into motion a negative feedback loop which in the end largely cancels firms' incentive to expand employment. In particular, as employment expands, labor market conditions in general begin to improve for workers and this puts them in a stronger position as they negotiate wages with employers. But, the resulting rise in the wage then cuts into the profits earned by firms and thus limits their incentive to hire workers. The problem has come to be known as the 'Shimer puzzle'. That puzzle can loosely be paraphrased as follows: "what modification to the DMP framework is needed to put it in line with the empirical evidence that employment rises sharply during a business cycle expansion?" Although enormous efforts have been made, the puzzle has largely resisted a solution, until the Milgrom paper. Milgrom (with Hall), argued that the bargaining framework used in the standard DMP model does not correspond well to the way wages are actually negotiated. They argue that, by the time workers and firms sit down to bargain, they know that there is a substantial amount to be gained if they make a deal. The firm's human resources department has most likely already checked out the worker to verify that they are suitable. Most likely, the worker has done a similar preliminary check to verify that they could make a useful contribution to the firm. A consequence of this is that if, during the negotiations, the firm and worker disagree, they are very unlikely to simply part ways. Instead, it is more likely that they continue negotiating until they do reach agreement. It follows that as they make proposals and counterproposals, bargaining worker/firm pairs are mindful of the various costs associated with delay and the making of counterproposals. They are not so concerned about the consequences of a total breakdown in negotiations and of having to go back to the general labor market to search for another worker or job. Milgrom stresses that with this shift in perspective on bargaining, the impact of improved general conditions on the wage bargain is weakened as long as costs of delay and renegotiation are not very sensitive to broader economic conditions. In particular, the approach provides a potential resolution to the Shimer puzzle, a puzzle that has confounded macroeconomists generally.

== Policy ==
=== FCC spectrum auction, 1993 ===
The U.S. Federal Communications Commission (FCC) has responsibility for allocating licenses for the use of electromagnetic spectrum to television broadcasters, mobile wireless services providers, satellite service providers, and others. Prior to 1993, the FCC's authorization from the U.S. Congress only allowed it to allocate licenses through an administrative process referred to as "comparative hearings" or by holding a lottery. Comparative hearings were extremely time-consuming and costly, and there were concerns about the ability of such a process to identify the 'best' owners for licenses. Lotteries were fast, but clearly a random allocation of licenses left much to be desired in terms of efficiency. Neither of these methods offered any ability for the FCC to capture some of the value of the spectrum licenses for the U.S. taxpayers.

Then in 1993, Congress authorized the FCC to hold auctions to allocate spectrum licenses. Auctions offered great potential in terms of obtaining an efficient allocation of licenses and also capturing some of the value of the licenses to be returned to the U.S. taxpayers. However, the FCC was directed to hold the auction within a year, and at that time no suitable auction design existed, either in theory or in practice.

Milgrom, together with Robert Wilson, Preston McAfee, and John McMillan, played a role in designing the simultaneous multiple round auction that was adopted and implemented by the FCC. Milgrom's auction theory research provided foundations that guided economists' thinking on auction design and ultimately the FCC's auction design choices.

The FCC needed an auction design suited to the sale of multiple licenses with potentially highly interdependent values. The FCC's goals included economic efficiency and revenue (although the legislation suggests an emphasis on efficiency over revenue) as well as operational simplicity and reasonable speed.

According to FCC economist Evan Kwerel, who was given the task of developing the FCCís auction design, Milgrom's proposals, analysis, and research were hugely influential in the auction design. Milgrom and Wilson proposed a simultaneous ascending bid auction with discrete bidding rounds, which "promised to provide much of the operational simplicity of sealed-bid auctions with the economic efficiency of an ascending auction." Milgrom argued successfully for a simultaneous closing rule, as opposed to a market-by-market closing rule advocated by others because the latter might foreclose efficient backup strategies.

Describing the Milgrom-Wilson auction design, Kwerel states:

It seemed to provide bidders sufficient information and flexibility to pursue backup strategies to promote a reasonably efficient assignment of licenses, without so much complexity that the FCC could not successfully implement it and bidders could not understand it. Just having a good idea, though, is not enough. Good ideas need good advocates if they are to be adopted. No advocate was more persuasive than Paul Milgrom. He was so persuasive because of his vision, clarity and economy of expression, ability to understand and address FCC needs, integrity, and passion for getting things right.

Milgrom's proposed design was adopted in large part by the commission. Called the simultaneous multiple round (SMR) auction, this design introduced several new features, mostly importantly an "activity rule" to ensure active bidding. Milgrom and Weber developed an activity rule to accompany their simultaneous closing rule to ensure that bidders could not hold back while observing the bids of others. The activity rule required that bidders maintain a certain level of activity, either by being the current high bidder or by submitting a new bid, in each round or else forfeit all or part of its eligibility to submit bids in future rounds. "Milgrom and Weber developed this insight into the activity rule that the FCC has used in all its simultaneous multiple round auctions. The Milgrom-Wilson activity rule was an elegant, novel solution to a difficult practical auction design issue." Activity rules are now common in dynamic multi-item auctions.

Milgrom's role in creating the FCC design is noted in an account by the US National Science Foundation (America's Investment in the Future), which identifies this auction design as one of the main practical contributions of 20th century research in microeconomic theory. The same invention and Milgrom's role in creating it was celebrated again by the prestigious National Academy of Sciences (Beyond Discovery), which is the main scientific advisor to the US government. The SMR design has been copied and adapted worldwide for auctions of radio spectrum, electricity, natural gas, etc. involving hundreds of billion dollars.

In the words of Evan Kwerel, "In the end, the FCC chose an ascending bid mechanism, largely because we believed that providing bidders with more information would likely increase efficiency and, as shown by Milgrom and Weber (1982), mitigate the winner's curse." The result alluded to by Kwerel is known as the Linkage principle and was developed by Milgrom and Weber (1982). (Milgrom (2004) recasts the linkage principle as the 'publicity effect.') It provided a theoretical foundation for the intuition driving the major design choice by the FCC between an ascending bid and sealed bid auction.

=== FCC incentive auctions ===
In 2012, the US Congress authorized the FCC to conduct the first spectrum incentive auctions. As envisioned by the FCC, the incentive auctions will enable television broadcast stations to submit bids to relinquish existing spectrum rights. Broadcast stations that opt to stay on-air will be reassigned to channels in a way that frees up a contiguous block of spectrum to be repurposed for wireless broadband, with licenses sold to telecommunications firms. Relative to prior spectrum auctions run in the United States and around the world, the incentive auctions will have the novel feature that they are a double auction: the proceeds from selling wireless broadband licenses will be used to compensate broadcasters who relinquish rights, or who must be re-located to new channels. Any further revenue will go to the Treasury.

Subsequent to receiving Congressional authorization, the FCC announced in March 2012 that Milgrom had been retained to lead a team of economists advising the FCC on the design of the incentive auctions. In September 2012, the FCC released Milgrom's preliminary report on the possible auction design.

== Teaching ==
Milgrom has taught a variety of courses in Economics. In the 1990s, he has developed a popular undergraduate course on The Modern Firm in Theory and Practice, based on his 1992 book with John Roberts. In the early 2000s, together with Alvin E. Roth, Milgrom taught the first graduate course on Market Design, which brought together topics on auctions, matching, and other related areas. The market design course has served as a basis for many similar graduate courses across the US and around the world, and has helped jump-start the field of Market Design.

In his teaching, Milgrom was always cognisant of what economic models could and could not do. He stressed the assumptions that made them useful in generating robust empirical predictions as well as the core assumptions upon which those predictions relied. This philosophy is perhaps exemplified in this reflect on the assumption of rational choice (with Jonathan Levin).

... it is worth emphasizing that despite the shortcomings of the rational choice model, it remains a remarkably powerful tool for policy analysis. To see why, imagine conducting a welfare analysis of alternative policies. Under the rational choice approach, one would begin by specifying the relevant preferences over economic outcomes (e.g. everyone likes to consume more, some people might not like inequality, and so on), then model the allocation of resources under alternative policies and finally compare policies by looking at preferences over the alternative outcomes.

Many of the "objectionable" simplifying features of the rational choice model combine to make such an analysis feasible. By taking preferences over economic outcomes as the starting point, the approach abstracts from the idea that preferences might be influenced by contextual details, by the policies themselves, or by the political process. Moreover, rational choice approaches to policy evaluation typically assume people will act in a way that maximizes these preferences – this is the justification for leaving choices in the hands of individuals whenever possible. Often, it is precisely these simplifications – that preferences are fundamental, focused on outcomes, and not too easily influenced by one's environment and that people are generally to reason through choices and act according to their preferences – that allow economic analysis to yield sharp answers to a broad range of interesting public policy questions.

The behavioral critiques we have just discussed put these features of the rational choice approach to policy evaluation into question. Of course institutions affect preferences and some people are willing to exchange worse economic outcomes for a sense of control. Preferences may even be affected by much smaller contextual details. Moreover, even if people have well-defined preferences, they may not act to maximize them. A crucial question then is whether an alternative model - for example an extension of the rational choice framework that incorporates some of these realistic features – would be a better tool for policy analysis. Developing equally powerful alternatives is an important unresolved question for future generations of economists.

== Business ==
Milgrom has been involved for at least two decades in the design and practice of large-scale auctions. Working with Bob Wilson on behalf of Pacific Bell, he proposed the simultaneous multiple round auction that was adopted by the FCC to run the initial auctions for radio spectrum in the 1990s. He has also advised regulators in the US, UK, Canada, Australia, Germany, Sweden and Mexico on spectrum auctions, Microsoft on search advertising auctions and Google on the auction at the basis of their IPO.

In 2006, along with Jeremy Bulow and Jonathan Levin, Milgrom advised Comcast in bidding on FCC Auction 66 including a rarely successfully implemented "jump bid." In the words of the Economist:

In the run-up to an online auction in 2006 of radio-spectrum licences by America's Federal Communications Commission, Paul Milgrom, a consultant and Stanford University professor, customised his game-theory software to assist a consortium of bidders. The result was a triumph.

When the auction began, Dr Milgrom's software tracked competitors' bids to estimate their budgets for the 1,132 licences on offer. Crucially, the software estimated the secret values bidders placed on specific licences and determined that certain big licences were being overvalued. It directed Dr Milgrom's clients to obtain a patchwork of smaller, less expensive licences instead. Two of his clients, Time Warner and Comcast, paid about a third less than their competitors for equivalent spectrum, saving almost $1.2 billion.

In 2007, Milgrom co-founded Auctionomics, with Silvia Console Battilana, to design auctions and advise bidders in different industries.

In 2009, Milgrom was responsible for the development of assignment auctions and exchanges. This was a mechanism that allowed for arbitrage possibilities and retained some of the flexibility of the simultaneous ascending bid auction but could be achieved instantaneously. The speed was an important attribute along with the potential to extend the auction design to consider bidding with non-price attributes.

In 2011, the FCC hired Auctionomics to tackle one of the most complex auction problems ever, the incentive auction. FCC Chairman Julius Genachowski said,

I am delighted to have this world-class team of experts advising the Commission on this historic undertaking. Our plan is to ensure that incentive auctions serve as an effective market mechanism to unleash more spectrum for mobile broadband and help address the looming spectrum crunch. Our implementation of this new Congressional mandate will be guided by the economics, and will seek to maximize the opportunity to unleash investment and innovation, benefit consumers, drive economic growth, and enhance our global competitiveness. The knowledge and experience of this team will complement the substantial expertise of agency staff to meet these goals.

In 2012, Auctionomics and Power Auctions were hired to design the FCC's first Incentive Auction, with the goal of creating a market for repurposing television broadcast spectrum to wireless broadband. The design team was led by Milgrom and includes Larry Ausubel, Kevin Leyton-Brown, Jon Levin and Ilya Segal.

In 2024, Milgrom, as part of Auctionomics, testified as an expert witness in the U.S. antitrust trial against Google.

Over the years, Milgrom has been active as an innovator and has been awarded four patents relating to auction design.

== Scholarly work and research ==
Milgrom is globally recognized as a founder of modern auction theory. Along with Robert Wilson, he developed foundational models for simultaneous multiple round (SMR) auctions, which have been widely used, especially in radio spectrum allocation.

He has made major contributions across several areas of microeconomics: incentive theory, industrial organization, game theory, the economics of organizations, and the microstructure of financial markets. He also worked on "core-selecting" package auctions (with Bob Day), designed online advertising auctions (for Yahoo!, Microsoft), and advised on government procurement auctions, electricity transmission rights, and more.

== Views and opinions ==
Milgrom sees market design not just as a theoretical exercise, but as a form of economic engineering. He believes economists can use theory, simulations, game theory, lab research, and algorithmic tools to build real-world mechanisms (like auctions) that improve how markets allocate resources.

He argues that well-designed auctions help markets work more efficiently, especially when resources are scarce or complex. In his view, auctions provide decentralized, information-based ways to allocate goods or permissions that traditional methods struggle with. Specifically, he emphasizes how auction rules matter deeply: small changes can drastically affect efficiency, revenue, and the strategies available to bidders.

Milgrom highlights that participants' private information and their incentives are central: auction rules must reflect how people learn from each other, how they bid strategically, and how their values depend on others' actions.

He believes auction-based mechanisms are a powerful tool for managing public goods. For instance, he has advocated for designing water markets through auctions to better allocate water rights, especially in regions facing drought or scarcity. Milgrom sees this work as part of a broader mission: economics should help society adapt to grand challenges like climate change, resource constraints, inequality, and institutional inefficiencies.

While he values fundamental theory, Milgrom stresses that the real payoff comes when theory is applied. He is pragmatic: designing rules that work in practice (e.g., for spectrum auctions or public resource markets) is just as important as pure theoretical elegance.

=== Political views ===
In June 2024, 16 Nobel Prize in Economics laureates, including Milgrom, signed an open letter arguing that Donald Trump's fiscal and trade policies coupled with efforts to limit the Federal Reserve's independence would reignite inflation in the United States.

== Publications (selected) ==
- Milgrom, Paul (1979a). The Structure of Information in Competitive Bidding. New York: Garland Press. (Ph.D. Dissertation)
- Milgrom, Paul (1979b). "A Convergence Theorem for Competitive Bidding with Differential Information". Econometrica. 47 (3): 679–88. doi:10.2307/1910414. JSTOR 1910414.
- Milgrom, Paul (1981a). "An Axiomatic Characterization of Common Knowledge" (PDF). Econometrica. 49 (1): 219–222. doi:10.2307/1911137. JSTOR 1911137.
- Milgrom, Paul (1981b). "Rational Expectations, Information Acquisition, and Competitive Bidding". Econometrica. 49 (4): 921–943. doi:10.2307/1912511. JSTOR 1912511.
- Milgrom, Paul (1981c). "Good News and Bad News: Representation Theorems and Applications". Bell Journal of Economics. 12 (2): 380–91. doi:10.2307/3003562. JSTOR 3003562.
- Milgrom, Paul; Roberts, John (1982). "Limit Pricing and Entry Under Incomplete Information: An Equilibrium Analysis" (PDF). Econometrica. 50 (2): 443–59. doi:10.2307/1912637. JSTOR 1912637.
- Milgrom, Paul; Roberts, John Roberts (1982). "Predation, Reputation, and Entry Deterrence" (PDF). Journal of Economic Theory. 27 (2): 280–312. doi:10.1016/0022-0531(82)90031-X. ISSN 0022-0531.
- Milgrom, Paul; Stokey, Nancy (1982). "Information, Trade and Common Knowledge" (PDF). Journal of Economic Theory. 26 (1): 17–27. doi:10.1016/0022-0531(82)90046-1.
- Milgrom, Paul; Weber, Robert (1982a). "The Value of Information in a Sealed Bid Auction" (PDF). Journal of Mathematical Economics. 10 (1): 105–14. doi:10.1016/0304-4068(82)90008-8. hdl:10419/220822. ISSN 0304-4068.
- Milgrom, Paul; Weber, Robert (1982b). "A Theory of Auctions and Competitive Bidding". Econometrica. 50 (5): 1089–1122. doi:10.2307/1911865. JSTOR 1911865.
- Kreps, David; Milgrom, Paul; Roberts, John; Wilson, Robert (1982). "Rational Cooperation in the Finitely‑Repeated Prisoners' Dilemma" (PDF). Journal of Economic Theory. 27 (2): 245‑252. doi:10.1016/0022-0531(82)90029-1.
- Engelbrecht-Wiggans, R.; Milgrom, Paul R.; Weber, Robert J. (1983). "Competitive bidding and proprietary information" (PDF). Journal of Mathematical Economics. 11 (2): 161–169. doi:10.1016/0304-4068(83)90034-4.
- Milgrom, Paul (1984). "Axelrod's "The Evolution of Cooperation"". The RAND Journal of Economics. 15 (2): 305–309. JSTOR 2555683.
- Milgrom, Paul; Weber, Robert (1985). "Distributional Strategies for Games with Incomplete Information" (PDF). Mathematics of Operations Research. 10 (4): 619–32. doi:10.1287/moor.10.4.619. hdl:10419/220788.
- Glosten, Larry; Milgrom, Paul (1985). "Bid, Ask and Transactions Prices in a Specialist Market with Insider Trading". Journal of Financial Economics. 14 (1): 71‑100. doi:10.1016/0304-405X(85)90044-3. ISSN 0304-405X.
- Milgrom, Paul; Roberts, John (1986a). "Price and Advertising Signals of Product Quality" (PDF). Journal of Political Economy. 94 (4): 796–821. doi:10.1086/261408. JSTOR 1833203. S2CID 154506015.
- Milgrom, Paul; Roberts, John (1986b). "Relying on the Information of Interested Parties" (PDF). The RAND Journal of Economics. 17 (1): 18–32. JSTOR 2555625.
- Holmstrom, Bengt; Milgrom, Paul (1987). "Aggregation and Linearity in the Provision of Intertemporal Incentives" (PDF). Econometrica. 55 (2): 303–328. doi:10.2307/1913238. JSTOR 1913238.
- Milgrom, Paul; Roberts, John (1987). "Informational Asymmetries, Strategic Behavior, and Industrial Organization". The American Economic Review. 77 (2): 184–193. JSTOR 1805448.
- Milgrom, Paul; Oster, Sharon (1987). "Job Discrimination, Market Forces and the Invisibility Hypothesis" (PDF). Quarterly Journal of Economics. 102 (3): 453–476. doi:10.2307/1884213. JSTOR 1884213.
- Milgrom, Paul; Roberts, John (1988). "An Economic Approach to Influence Activities and Organizational Responses". American Journal of Sociology. 94: S154–S179. doi:10.1086/228945. JSTOR 2780245. S2CID 154341784.
- Milgrom, Paul (1988). "Employment Contracts, Influence Activities, and Efficient Organization Design". Journal of Political Economy. 96 (1): 42–60. doi:10.1086/261523. JSTOR 1830709. S2CID 154458173.
- Milgrom, Paul and John Roberts (1988). "Communication and Inventories as Substitutes in Organizing Production". Scandinavian Journal of Economics. 90 (3): 275–289. doi:10.2307/3440309. JSTOR 3440309.
- Milgrom, Paul (1989). "Auctions and Bidding: A Primer". The Journal of Economic Perspectives. 3 (3): 3–22. doi:10.1257/jep.3.3.3. JSTOR 1942756.
- Fudenberg, Drew; Holmstrom, Bengt; Paul Milgrom (1990). "Short-term contracts and long-term agency relationships". Journal of Economic Theory. 51 (1): 154–159. doi:10.1016/0022-0531(90)90048-O. hdl:1721.1/64269. JSTOR 2006561.
- Milgrom, Paul; Roberts, John (1990a). "The Efficiency of Equity in Organizational Decision Processes". The American Economic Review. 80 (2): 1–31. doi:10.1016/0022-0531(90)90048-O. hdl:1721.1/64269. ISSN 0022-0531. JSTOR 2006561.
- Milgrom, Paul; Roberts, John (1990b). "The Economics of Modern Manufacturing: Technology, Strategy and Organization". American Economic Review. 80 (3): 511–28. JSTOR 2006681.
- Milgrom, Paul; Roberts, John (1990c). "Rationalizability, Learning and Equilibrium in Games With Strategic Complementarities". Econometrica. 58 (6): 1255–1278. doi:10.2307/2938316. JSTOR 2938316.
- Milgrom, Paul; North, Douglass C.; Weingast, Barry R. (1990). "The role of institutions in the revival of trade: the law merchant, private judges, and the champagne fairs". Economics and Politics. 2 (1): 1–23. doi:10.1111/j.1468-0343.1990.tb00020.x.
- Holmstrom, Bengt; Milgrom, Paul (1991). "Multitask Principal-Agent Analyses: Incentive Contracts, Asset Ownership and Job Design". Journal of Law, Economics, & Organization. 7: 303–328. doi:10.1093/jleo/7.special_issue.24. JSTOR 764957.
- Abreu, D.; Milgrom, Paul; Pearce, David (1991). "Information and Timing in Repeated Partnerships". Econometrica. 59 (6): 1713–1733. doi:10.2307/2938286. JSTOR 2938286.
- Milgrom, Paul; Qian, Yingi; Roberts, John (1991). "Complementarities, Momentum, and the Evolution of Modern Manufacturing". The American Economic Review. 81 (2): 84–88. JSTOR 2006831.
- Milgrom, Paul; Roberts, John (1991). "Adaptive and sophisticated learning in normal form games". Games and Economic Behavior. 82 (100): 82–100. doi:10.1016/0899-8256(91)90006-Z. ISSN 0899-8256.
- Milgrom, Paul; Roberts, John (1992). Economics, Organization and Management. Prentice Hall. ISBN 978-0-13-224650-7.
- Bresnahan, Timothy F.; Milgrom, Paul; Paul, Jonathan (1992). "The Real Output of the Stock Exchange". Output Measurement in the Services Sectors: 195–216.
- Meyer, Margaret; Paul Milgrom; Roberts, John (1992). "Organizational Prospects, Influence Costs, and Ownership Changes". Journal of Economics & Management Strategy. 1 (1): 9–35. doi:10.1111/j.1430-9134.1992.00009.x.
- Milgrom, Paul (1994). "Comparing Optima: Do Simplifying Assumptions Affect Conclusions?". Journal of Political Economy. 102 (3): 607–615. doi:10.1086/261948. JSTOR 2138625. S2CID 153568621.
- Milgrom, Paul; Roberts, John (1994). "Comparing Equilibria". The American Economic Review. 84 (3): 441–459. JSTOR 2118061.
- Milgrom, Paul; Shannon, Chris (1994). "Monotone Comparative Statics". Econometrica. 62 (1): 157–180. doi:10.2307/2951479. JSTOR 2951479.
- Holmstrom, Bengt; Milgrom, Paul (1994). "The Firm as an Incentive System". The American Economic Review. 84 (4): 972–991. JSTOR 2118041.
- Greif, Avner; Milgrom, Paul; Weingast, Barry R. (1994). "Coordination, Commitment, and Enforcement: The Case of the Merchant Guild". Journal of Political Economy. 102 (4): 745–776. doi:10.1086/261953. JSTOR 2138763. S2CID 154501745.
- Milgrom, Paul; Roberts, John (1994). "Complementarities and Fit: Strategy, Structure and Organizational Change in Manufacturing". Journal of Accounting and Economics. 19 (2–3): 179–208. doi:10.1016/0165-4101(94)00382-f. ISSN 0165-4101.
- Milgrom, Paul; Roberts, John (1995). "The Economics of Modern Manufacturing: Reply". The American Economic Review. 85 (4): 997–999. JSTOR 2118249.
- Milgrom, Paul; Roberts, John (1996a). "The LeChatelier Principle". The American Economic Review. 86 (1): 113–128. JSTOR 2118261.
- Milgrom, Paul; Roberts, John (1996b). "Coalition-Proofness and Correlation with Arbitrary Communication Possibilities". Games and Economic Behavior. 17 (1): 173–179. doi:10.1006/game.1996.0096.
- Milgrom, Paul (1998). "Game theory and the spectrum auctions". European Economic Review. 42 (3–5): 771–778. doi:10.1016/S0014-2921(97)00146-3. ISSN 0014-2921.
- Milgrom, Paul (2000). "Putting Auction Theory to Work: The Simulteneous Ascending Auction". Journal of Political Economy. 108 (2): 245–272. doi:10.1086/262118. JSTOR 262118. S2CID 14242011.
- Ausubel, Lawrence M.; Milgrom, Paul (2002). "Ascending Auctions with Package Bidding". The B.E. Journal of Theoretical Economics. 1 (1) 20011001. doi:10.2202/1534-5963.1019. ISSN 1534-5963. S2CID 1083684.
- Milgrom, Paul; Segal, Ilya (2002). "Envelope Theorems for Arbitrary Choice Sets". Econometrica. 70 (2): 583–601. doi:10.1111/1468-0262.00296. JSTOR 2692283. SSRN 312251.
- Milgrom, Paul (2004). Putting Auction Theory to Work. Cambridge University Press. ISBN 978-0-521-53672-1.
- Hatfield, John W.; Milgrom, Paul (2005). "Matching with Contracts". The American Economic Review. 95 (4): 913–935. doi:10.1257/0002828054825466. JSTOR 4132699.
- Ausubel, Lawrence M.; Cramton, Peter; Milgrom, Paul (2006). Cramton, Peter; Shoham, Yoav; Steinberg, Richard (eds.). "The Clock-Proxy Auction: A Practical Combinatorial Auction Design". In Combinatorial Auctions, Edited by Cramton, P., Shoham, Y., and Steinberg, R. MIT Press. doi:10.7551/mitpress/9780262033428.001.0001. ISBN 978-0-2620-3342-8.
- Ausubel, Lawrence M.; Milgrom, Paul (2006a). Cramton, P.; Shoham, Y.; Steinberg, R. (eds.). "The Lovely but Lonely Vickrey Auction". In Combinatorial Auctions. MIT press: 17–40. doi:10.7551/mitpress/9780262033428.003.0002. ISBN 978-0-262-03342-8.
- Ausubel, Lawrence M.; Milgrom, Paul (2006b). Cramton, P.; Shoham, Y.; Steinberg, R. (eds.). "Ascending Proxy Auctions". In Combinatorial Auctions.
- Milgrom, Paul (2007). "Package Auctions and Exchanges". Econometrica. 75 (4): 935–965. doi:10.1111/j.1468-0262.2007.00778.x. JSTOR 4502017.
- Milgrom, Paul (2008). "What the Seller Won't Tell You: Persuasion and Disclosure in Markets". Journal of Economic Perspectives. 22 (2): 115–131. doi:10.1257/jep.22.2.115. JSTOR 27648244.
- Hall, Robert E.; Milgrom, Paul R. (2008). "The Limited Influence of Unemployment on the Wage Bargain". The American Economic Review. 98 (4): 1653–1674. doi:10.1257/aer.98.4.1653. JSTOR 29730140. S2CID 18040832.
- Day, R.; Milgrom, Paul (2008). "Core-selecting package auctions". International Journal of Game Theory. 36 (3–4): 393–407. doi:10.1007/s00182-007-0100-7. S2CID 7593117.
- Milgrom, Paul (2009). "Assignment Messages and Exchanges". American Economic Journal: Microeconomics. 1 (2): 95–113. doi:10.1257/mic.1.2.95.
- Milgrom, Paul; Bruno Strulovici (2009). "Substitute goods, auctions, and equilibrium". Journal of Economic Theory. 144 (1): 212–247. doi:10.1016/j.jet.2008.05.002.
- Milgrom, Paul (2010). "Ascending Prices and Package Bidding: A Theoretical and Experimental Analysis". American Economic Journal: Microeconomics. 2 (3): 160–185. doi:10.1257/mic.2.3.160. S2CID 5766480.
- Milgrom, Paul (2010). "Simplified mechanisms with an application to sponsored-search auctions". Games and Economic Behavior. 70 (1): 62–70. doi:10.1016/j.geb.2008.12.003. SSRN 1022220.
- Levin, Jonathan; Milgrom, Paul (2010). "Online Advertising: Heterogeneity and Conflation in Market Design". American Economic Review. 100 (2): 603–607. doi:10.1257/aer.100.2.603.
- Milgrom, Paul (2011). "Critical Issues in the Practice of Market Design". Economic Inquiry. 49 (2): 311–320. doi:10.1111/j.1465-7295.2010.00357.x. S2CID 153765277.
- Budish, E.; Che, Y.-K.; Kojima, F.; Milgrom, Paul (2013). "Designing Random Allocation Mechanisms: Theory and Applications". American Economic Review. 103 (2): 585–623. doi:10.1257/aer.103.2.585.

== See also ==
- List of Jewish Nobel laureates
