= Jean-Pierre Ponssard =

French economist (born 1946)

Jean-Pierre Ponssard (born 1946) is a French economist, senior research fellow of the CNRS, and professor of economics and research vice president of the economic department of the École Polytechnique.

He graduated from Ingénieur Ecole Polytechnique (X 1966), and PhD of Stanford University (1971).

He received the CNRS Silver Medal in 1992, and was named "best economist of the year in industrial organization" by Nouvel Economiste in 1993.

He specialises in organisation theory, industrial organization, and game theory.
