= CDR =

CDR may refer to:

== Technology ==
- Carbon dioxide removal, ways to remove carbon dioxide from the atmosphere
- Call detail record, a record of a (billing) event produced by a telecommunication network element
- Charging data record, a record of a (billing) event produced by a data network element in 3GPP networks
- China Digital Radio (or Convergent Digital Radio), a Chinese standard for digital radio broadcasting; competitor to DAB, HD Radio, DRM+
- Climate Data Record, a time series of measurements of sufficient length, consistency, and continuity to determine climate variability and change
- Committed data rate, a concept in telecommunications
- Crash Data Retrieval, a tool for imaging or downloading data from an Event data recorder

=== Computing ===
- CD-R, a recordable compact disc format
- Character Detection & Recognition, the detection and recognition of images with typed characters.
- CAR and CDR, in the programming language Lisp
- CDR coding, in the programming language Lisp
- CDR (file format), native to CorelDRAW
- .cdr, the file extension used for ISO 9660 disk images created by Disk Utility in Mac OS X
- Clock and data recovery, a method of synchronizing with serialized data received without a clock signal
- Common Data Representation, a format used to represent data types during remote invocations on Common Object Request Broker Architecture
- Content Disarm & Reconstruction, a computer security technology that removes malicious code from files by processing all incoming files of an enterprise network, deconstructing them, and removing the elements that do not match the file type's standards or set policies.
- Corporate Digital Responsibility, a set of rules compiled by a company that defines their ethical values when creating digital products.

== Military ==
- Commander, a naval rank
- Commander (United States), a US naval military rank
- Commander, a NASA Astronaut designation for the commander of a mission
- Critical design review, a U.S. government design review in the engineering process

== Organizations ==
- Center for the Development of Recycling, a recycling service organization at San Jose State University
- Center for Decision Research, a research group at the University of Chicago Graduate School of Business
- Coalition for the Defence of the Republic, a Rwandan political party involved in the 1994 Genocide
- Committees for the Defense of the Revolution, ("Comités de Defensa de la Revolución") in Cuba
- Committees for the Defense of the Revolution (Burkina Faso) ("Comités de Défense de la Révolution")
- Congolese Democratic Republic
- Committee for the Defence of the Revolution (Ghana), see List of abbreviations in Ghana
- European Committee of the Regions, Comité des Régions, an EU organization
- Council on Disaster Reduction, of the American Society of Civil Engineers
- Council for Democratic Reform, a former military junta ruling Thailand
- Lebanese Council for Development and Reconstruction, organization founded to reconstruct Lebanon in 1977
- Romanian Democratic Convention, a former Romanian political alliance
- County Donegal Railway, a railway that was under the auspices of the County Donegal Railways Joint Committee
- Committees for the Defense of the Republic, local assemblies to defend the Catalan Republic
- Democratic Revolutionary Council (French: Conseil démocratique révolutionnaire), a rebel faction in Chad
- Center for Democratic Renewal, American progressive advocacy group

== Science and medicine ==
- Clinical data repository, a medical database system designed to provide a realtime summary of a patient's condition
- Clinical Dementia Rating, a numeric scale used to quantify the severity of symptoms of dementia
- Cognitive dissonance reduction, a theory in psychology assuming that individuals seek consistency between their expectations and their reality.
- Complementarity-determining region, one of six hypervariable loops which determine the antigen specificity of a given antibody
- CDR computerized assessment system
- Challenge–dechallenge–rechallenge, a medical testing protocol
- Common Drug Review, a process for making drug formulary listing recommendations by the Canadian Agency for Drugs and Technologies in Health (CADTH)
- Crude death rate, a demographic measure of the mortality rate
- Cup-to-disc ratio, relation from cup to disc of the optic disc
- Mitosis inducer protein kinase cdr2, a mitotic regular in yeast
- CDR2 (gene), cerebellar degeneration-related protein 2

== Other uses ==
- Canada's Drag Race, a Canadian drag reality competition TV show
- Chadron Municipal Airport, an airport in United States
- Chris Douglas-Roberts, American basketball player
- Consumer Data Right, a framework for consumer data portability in Australia.
- Competency Demonstration Report: Skills assessment document used by Engineers Australia to recognise the non-accredited or non-accord qualifications.

== See also ==
- CCDR (disambiguation)
