= Goods and services =

Things made and done for people

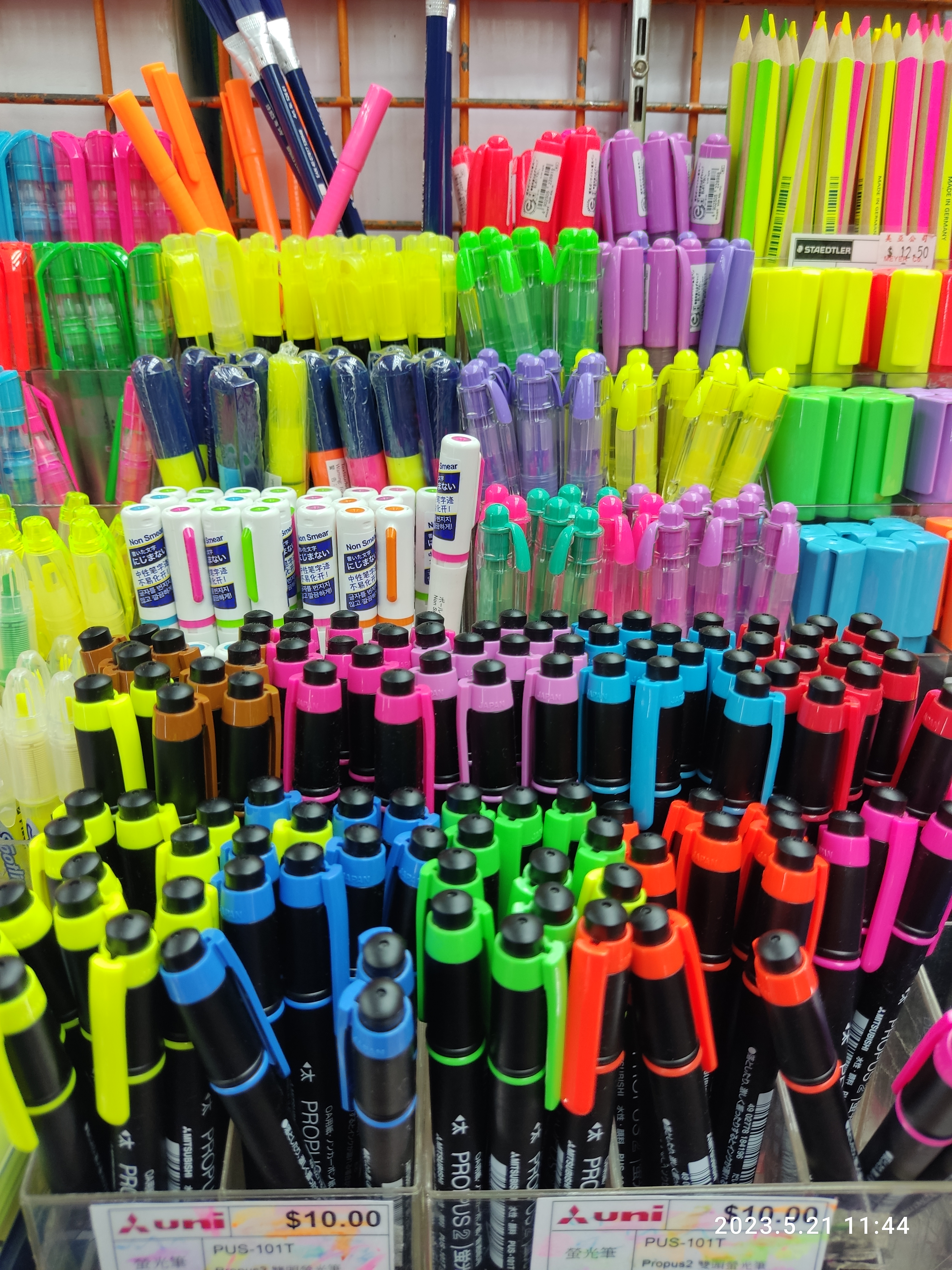
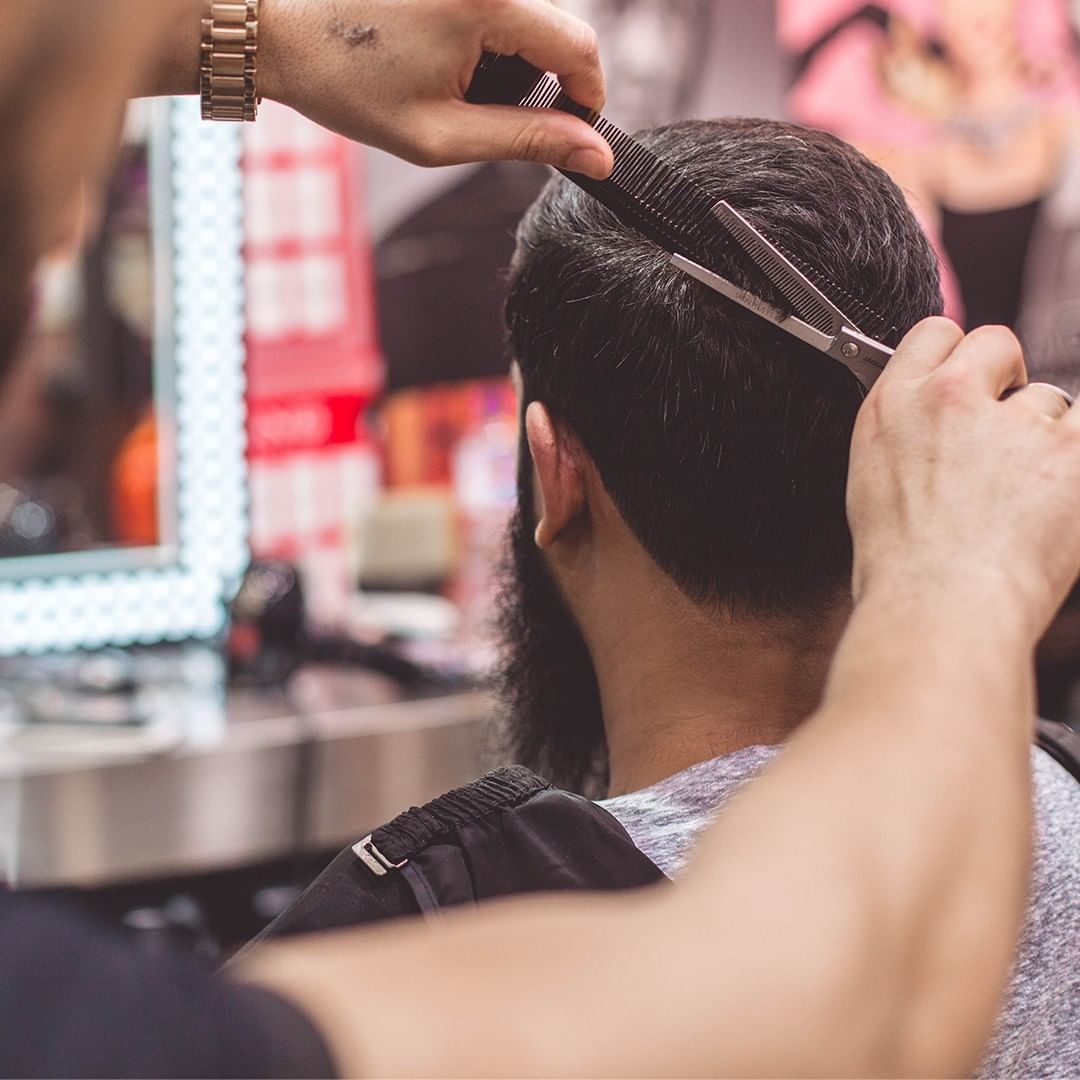
Pens are physical goods, while barbering is an intangible service.

Goods are items that are usually (but not always) tangible, such as pens or pears. Services are activities provided by other people, such as teachers or barbers. Taken together, it is the production, distribution, and consumption of goods and services which underpins all economic activity and trade. According to economic theory, consumption of goods and services is assumed to provide utility (satisfaction) to the consumer or end-user, although businesses also consume goods and services in the course of producing their own.

== History ==
Physiocratic economists categorized production into productive labour and unproductive labour. Adam Smith expanded this thought by arguing that any economic activities directly related to material products (goods) were productive, and those activities which involved non-material production (services) were unproductive. This emphasis on material production was adapted by David Ricardo, Thomas Robert Malthus and John Stuart Mill, and influenced later Marxian economics. Other, mainly Italian, 18th-century economists maintained that all desired goods and services were productive.

== Service-goods continuum ==
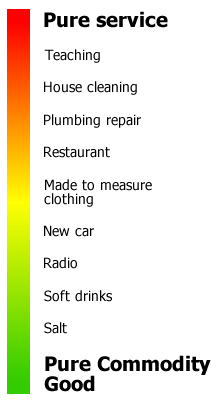
Service-goods continuum

The division of consumables into services is a simplification: these are not discrete categories. Most business theorists see a continuum with pure service at one endpoint and pure tangible commodity goods at the other. Most products fall between these two extremes. For example, a restaurant provides a physical good (prepared food), but also provides services in the form of ambience, the setting and clearing of the table, etc. Although some utilities, such as electricity and communications service providers, exclusively provide services, other utilities deliver physical goods, such as water utilities. For public sector contracting purposes, the electricity supply is defined among goods rather than services in the European Union, whereas under United States federal procurement regulations, it is treated as a service.

Goods are normally structural and can be transferred in an instant while services are delivered over a period of time. Goods can be returned while a service, once delivered cannot. Goods are not always tangible and may be virtual e.g. a book may be paper or electronic.

Marketing theory makes use of the service-goods continuum as an important concept which "enables marketers to see the relative goods/services composition of total products".

== In international law ==
Distinctions are made between goods and services in the context of international trade liberalization. For example, the World Trade Organization's General Agreement on Tariffs and Trade (GATT) covers international trade in goods and the General Agreement on Trade in Services (GATS) covers the services sector.

== See also ==
- Commodity (Marxism)
- Engagement marketing
- Fast-moving consumer goods
- Intangible good
- Goods and services tax
- List of countries by GDP sector composition
- Tertiary sector of the economy
- Three-sector model
- Universal basic services
