= ICDR =

- Interim Climate Data Record
- International Centre for Dispute Resolution
- Ivanhoé Chevalier Du Roi

== See also ==
- ICDr.
