= Corporate responsibility =

Business concept

Corporate responsibility is a term which has come to characterize a family of professional disciplines intended to help a corporation stay competitive by maintaining accountability to its four main stakeholder groups: customers, employees, shareholders, and communities.

== Concept ==
The professional disciplines included in the corporate responsibility field include legal and financial compliance, business ethics, corporate social responsibility, public and community affairs, investor relations, stakeholder communications, brand management, environmental affairs, sustainability, socially responsible investment, and corporate philanthropy.

== Prevalence ==
Major membership organizations and media in the Corporate Responsibility industry include Business in the Community (bitc.org.uk), WBCSD.org, CERES, National Investor Relations Institute, and Compliance Week.

== Media coverage ==
Business Ethics magazine (acquired in August, 2006 by The CRO, or Corporate Responsibility Officer) has helped to define the field with its 100 Best Corporate Citizens list, published since 1998. The Corporate Responsibility industry, which includes all professional services purchased by for-profit and not-for-profit companies to maintain their levels of corporate responsibility, was valued by the CRO magazine at $20 billion in 2005.

In the USA, the failings of corporate responsibility have been closely associated with the corporate scandals (Enron, Tyco, Citigroup) of the 2000-2004 period and the Sarbanes–Oxley Act of 2002, which was passed in response to these accounting scandals. Section 302 of the Sarbanes–Oxley Act specifically refers to the corporate responsibilities of the "signing officers" responsible for signing-off financial reports and accounts.

In the UK and Europe, the term is more generally associated with the local and Europe-wide regulations holding companies accountable to their stakeholders.

== See also ==
- Corporate social responsibility
- Corporate digital responsibility
