= Digital sustainability =

Concept involving intangible goods

Digital sustainability is the design and management of information and communications technology (ICT) to minimize ecological damage while still supporting sustainable social and economic systems. Despite early definitions of this term focusing mainly on digital preservation and the long-term accessibility of digital assets, more recent research addresses digital sustainability by reducing the environmental and resource footprint of digital infrastructures.

== Definition and distinction ==
Digital sustainability distinguishes itself from the original definition of sustainability in that digital sustainability exclusively deals with intangible goods, so-called knowledge goods. Such non-physical resources are non-rivalrous, so that no consumption of the goods can occur. Nevertheless, digital resources can be both excludable (a so-called club goods) and non-excludable (a so-called public goods). An important distinction is to be made between sustainability and digital sustainability whereas natural‑resource sustainability focuses on limiting over‑consumption, digital‑artifact sustainability instead must ensure sufficient creation and use of resources. Through the protection of intellectual property, digital resources can be excluded from free use and further development (see also "Copyright").

== Environmental footprint of infrastructure ==
Maintaining long-term access to digital information requires a large-scale physical infrastructure, including data centers, transmission networks and the users' devices. The rapid growth of cloud computing and streaming services has increased analysis of the physical resources necessary to operate digital systems.

=== Electricity consumption and efficiency ===
Data centers and data transmission networks are a significant part of global electricity demand. According to the International Energy Agency (IEA), data centers consumed an estimated 460 terawatt-hours (TWh) of electricity globally in 2022, representing around 1% to 1.5% of global electricity consumption. Due to the growth of artificial intelligence, cloud services and cryptocurrency, in a 2024 report, the IEA projected global data center electricity consumption to reach between 620 and 1050 TWh by 2026.

Trends suggest that considerable efficiency gains have reduced the growth of energy consumption in relation to computational demand. Between 2010 and 2018, global data center computing resources increased roughly 550%, while total electricity demand grew by only around 6%. However, researchers warn that future efficiency gains may slow down, making current infrastructure optimization and zero-emissions power supply essential to reducing carbon emissions. The IEA notes that although the performance per watt of leading AI processors improved by around 30 to 40% per year between 2016 and 2025, rapid growth in demand for computing means efficiency alone is unlikely to reduce aggregate data center electricity demand in the near term.

=== Water footprint ===
Digital infrastructures also require substantial volumes of water, especially for cooling servers and for generating the electricity that powers facilities. Evaporative cooling systems consume large quantities of potable water to maintain optimal operating temperatures in data centers.

Research indicates that water consumption standards are often not included in corporate sustainability reports, leading to an incomplete analysis of data center environmental impacts. Water usage also represents local environmental risks, especially when data centers are situated in dry regions, where industrial cooling competes directly with ecological water supplies.

== Ten preconditions of digital sustainability ==
In early 2017, a scientific publication appeared in Sustainability Science by Springer Publishing and in July 2017 a related article in German describing ten preconditions of digital sustainability. The first four criteria concern the properties of the digital goods, the next five criteria the properties of the ecosystem, and the last criterion the impact on society. Concrete examples of digital sustainability include Wikipedia, Linux, and OpenStreetMap.

The following ten preconditions of digital sustainability were presented with individual icons at DINAcon 2017. These are also published on Wikimedia Commons under the Creative Commons Zero license.

=== Properties of the digital good ===
1. Elaborateness: The digital good must be qualitatively elaborate. For example, a software solution must be high-quality programmed, function correctly and securely, and fully cover the necessary requirements.
2. Transparent structures: Digitally sustainable goods must have transparent structures, meaning the source code of a software must be fully disclosed and the format of data must be publicly documented using an open standard. This technical transparency enables control and improvements, leading to more trust and fewer errors.
3. Semantic data: The advancing digitization requires that information is not only understood by humans but also by machines. Consequently, digitally sustainable information must be linked through semantic data. Such metadata allows large amounts of digital information to be processed, aggregated, and interpreted by machines.
4. Distributed location: In the digital world, the physical aspect also plays an important role. If data is stored only in one location or a system runs only on a single server, the long-term availability of these digital goods is at risk. It is digitally sustainable if information and applications are redundantly stored in multiple locations, for example, using peer-to-peer approaches. This reduces dependence on the physical location and increases permanent availability.

=== Properties of the ecosystem ===
5. Open licensing regime: Legal frameworks must allow digital goods to be freely used, modified, and redistributed. This way, once created digital knowledge can be improved and applied unrestrictedly by society. This is the case, for example, with open source, open data, or open access licenses.
6. Shared tacit knowledge: The expert improvement and expansion of digital knowledge requires that know-how and experience (tacit knowledge) are distributed among as many people as possible from different organizations. This reduces the knowledge-dependence on individual persons and companies (lock-in effect) and increases contributions from others.
7. Participatory culture: All competent individuals should be able to contribute constructively to the expansion and further development of the digital good. This requires a healthy participation culture. For example, peer review processes in the community can ensure the required quality of data and software.
8. Good governance: Good governance ensures that control over the digital good does not lie with a single person or organization but is distributed as decentralized as possible. Transparent governance structures such as public elections or the meritocracy principle regulate the responsibilities. This criterion is based on the concept of good governance.
9. Diversified financing: The infrastructure (such as Internet servers), the responsible personnel, and other resources should be paid for by as many different actors as possible. Broadly supported financing allows independence from a single institution and reduces conflict of interest.

=== Impact on Society ===
10. Contributing to sustainable development: Digitally sustainable goods and their communities should contribute to sustainable development in the classical sense. In other words, digitally sustainable programs and data should have a positive ecological, social, or economic impact. At the same time, digitally sustainable goods must use resources from a sustainable background in their production and application. For example, the production of digital goods should be done by workers with fair remuneration and electricity from renewable energy sources should be used.

== Digital sustainability in academia ==
Since 2004, the definition by Marcus Dapp has been further developed and taught in a lecture of the same name at ETH Zurich. The student organizations TheAlternative and SUBDiN (University of Basel) also describe this new sustainability approach in detail. The first historical text that explained the concept in writing was a competition entry for the anniversary publication "Essays 2030" of ETH Zurich, titled "ETH Zurich - A Pioneer in Digital Sustainability". A more recent contribution describes digital sustainability in the context of Open Data and Open-Source Software.

Since 2014, the University of Bern has had the Research Center for Digital Sustainability. The center is led by Matthias Stürmer and employs around 20 staff members. The research center was established with a start-up funding of CHF 80,000 from CH Open at the Institute of Information Systems. Since 2019, the research center has been located at the Institute of Computer Science. The research center addresses issues related to open-source software, open data, linked data, open government, smart city, blockchain, smart contracts, and public procurement in research, teaching, and service provision.

== Open-source software and sustainability ==
Based on the definition of sustainability, Thorsten Busch describes in the Open Source Yearbook 2008 the relationship between open-source software and the concept of sustainability. The extensive literature analysis addresses both the ecological aspects of information and communications technology and the societal influences of digital, intangible resources. The focus is on the problem of the digital divide, which, according to Busch, could be reduced, for example, by promoting open-source software. Busch uses the term "informational sustainability" coined by Volker Grassmuck for the same issue as the concept of digital sustainability described here.
