= Shawna Meyer =

American architect and educator

Shawna Meyer is an American architect, educator, and founding principal of the architecture practice Atelier Mey. Her work focuses on climate resilience, sustainable material use, and architecture's relationship to place. Meyer is recognized for her research-driven practice and academic contributions related to environmental design, mass timber construction, and coastal adaptation.

== Early life and education ==
Meyer earned a Master of Architecture from the University of Minnesota in 2008 and a Bachelor of Architectural Science from the University of Arkansas in 2005.

== Career ==
Shawna Meyer began her professional architecture career working with several firms in Minneapolis, including Cunningham Group, VJAA, and BKV Group, where she contributed to a range of institutional and commercial projects.

In 2019, Meyer co-founded Atelier Mey, an architecture and design practice based in Miami, Florida, where she serves as a founding principal. Through Atelier Mey, she focuses on climate resilience, sustainable materials, and context-driven design, leading projects that span residential, institutional, and public architecture. The firm's work has received national recognition including selection as a finalist for the U.S. Pavilion at the 2025 Venice Architecture Biennale, exhibition at the National Building Museum, and media coverage in Architectural Record, Domus, and the television show ByDesign America.

Alongside her professional practice, Meyer is active in academia as a lecturer at the University of Miami School of Architecture and collaborates with the Littoral Urbanism Lab, engaging in research on coastal adaptation and environmental design.

== Writing and exhibitions ==
Meyer is the co-author of Buoyant Clarity, published as part of Pamphlet Architecture 36, a series curated by Princeton Architectural Press. Her writing has appeared in architectural journals and conference proceedings, including MAS Context and publications by the Association of Collegiate Schools of Architecture (ACSA).

Her work has been exhibited nationally and internationally, including at the Venice Architecture Biennale.

== Recognition ==
In 2018, Meyer was named to the Grist 50, a list recognizing emerging leaders in sustainability and climate innovation.

Her firm's project "House in a Garden" received national media attention for its use of mass timber construction in a hurricane-prone region. It was featured in Architectural Record and profiled by other design media.
