= VRC =

VRC may refer to:

== Organizations ==
- Vaccine Research Center
- Vancouver Rowing Club, formed in 1886
- Veteran Reserve Corps
- Victoria Racing Club
  - VRC Oaks
- Victoria Rifles of Canada
- Videogame Rating Council, rating games for Sega of America
- Vulnerability and Risk Committee of the American Society of Civil Engineers
- Great Britain Volunteer Rifle Corps of Volunteer Force

== Other uses ==
- Virac Airport's IATA code
- Vex Robotics Competition
- VRChat
