= Service (economics) =

Activity for which payment is due

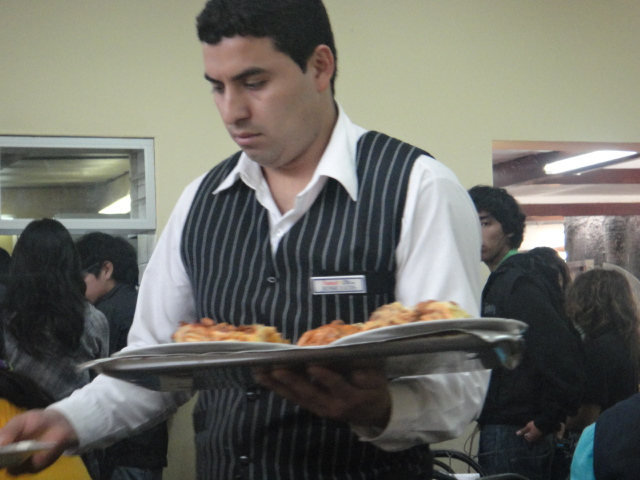
A restaurant waiter is an example of a service-related occupation.

A service is an act or use for which a consumer, company, or government is willing to pay. Examples include work done by barbers, doctors, lawyers, accountants, mechanics, banks, finance, insurance companies, and so on. Public services are those that society (nation state, fiscal union or region) as a whole pays for, such as hospitals, elementary schools, or libraries. Using resources, skill, ingenuity, and experience, service providers give benefit to service consumers. Services may be defined as intangible acts or performances whereby the service provider provides value to the customer.

== Characteristics ==
Services have three characteristics:

=== Intangibility ===
Services are by definition intangible. They are not manufactured, transported or stocked. Unlike with durable goods, one cannot store services for future use. They are produced and consumed simultaneously.

=== Perishability ===
Services are perishable in two regards:

- Service-relevant resources, processes, and systems are assigned for service delivery during a specific period in time. If the service consumer does not request and consume the service during this period, the related resources may go unused. From the perspective of the service provider, this is a lost business opportunity if no other use for those resources is available. Examples: A hairdresser serves another client. An empty seat on an airplane cannot be filled after departure.
- When the service has been completely rendered to the consumer, this particular service irreversibly vanishes. Example: a passenger has been transported to the destination.

The service provider must deliver the service at the exact time of service consumption. The service is not manifested in a physical object that is independent of the provider. The service consumer is also inseparable from service delivery. Examples: The service consumer must sit in the hairdresser's chair, or in the airplane seat. Correspondingly, the hairdresser or the pilot must be in the shop or plane, respectively, to deliver the service.

=== Variability ===
Each service is unique. It can never be exactly repeated because the time, location, circumstances, conditions, current configurations, or assigned resources may differ for the next delivery, even if the same service is requested by the consumer. Many services are regarded as heterogeneous and are typically modified for each service consumer or for each service context. Example: The taxi service which transports the service consumer from home to work is different from the taxi service which transports the same service consumer from work to home – another point in time, the other direction, possibly another route, probably another taxi-driver and cab. Another and more common term for this is heterogeneity.

== Service quality ==
Mass generation and delivery of services must be mastered for a service provider to expand. This can be seen as a problem of service quality. Both inputs and outputs to the processes involved providing services are highly variable, as are the relationships between these processes, making it difficult to maintain consistent service quality. Many services involve variable human activity, rather than a precisely determined process; exceptions include utilities. The human factor is often the key success factor in service provision. Demand can vary by season, time of day, business cycle, etc. Consistency is necessary to create enduring business relationships.

== Specification ==
Any service can be clearly and completely, consistently and concisely specified by means of standard attributes that conform to the MECE principle (Mutually Exclusive, Collectively Exhaustive).

- Service consumer benefits – (set of) benefits that are triggerable, consumable and effectively utilizable for any authorized service consumer and that are rendered upon request. These benefits should be clearly defined in terms that are meaningful to consumers.
- Service-specific functional parameters – parameters that are essential to the respective service and that describe the important dimension(s) of the servicescape, the service output or the service outcome, e.g. whether the passenger sits in an aisle or window seat.
- Service delivery point – the physical location or logical interface where the benefits of the service are rendered to the consumer. At this point the service delivery preparation can be assessed and delivery can be monitored and controlled.
- Service consumer count – the number of consumers that are enabled to consume a service.
- Service delivery readiness time – the moments when the service is available and all the specified service elements are available at the delivery point
- Service consumer support times – the moments when the support team ("service desk") is available. The service desk is the Single Point of Contact (SPoC) for service inquiries. At those times, the service desk can be reached via commonly available communication methods (phone, web, etc.)
- Service consumer support language – the language(s) spoken by the service desk.
- Service fulfillment target – the provider's promise to deliver the service, expressed as the ratio of the count of successful service deliveries to the count of service requests by a single consumer or consumer group over some time period.
- Service impairment duration – the maximum allowable interval between the first occurrence of a service impairment and the full resumption and completion of the service delivery.
- Service delivery duration – the maximum allowable period for effectively rendering all service benefits to the consumer.
- Service delivery unit – the scope/number of action(s) that constitute a delivered service. Serves as the reference object for the Service Delivering Price, for all service costs as well as for charging and billing.
- Service delivery price refers to the amount of money a customer pays to receive a service. Typically, the price includes a service access fee that qualifies the consumer to request the service and a service consumption fee for each delivered service.

== Delivery ==
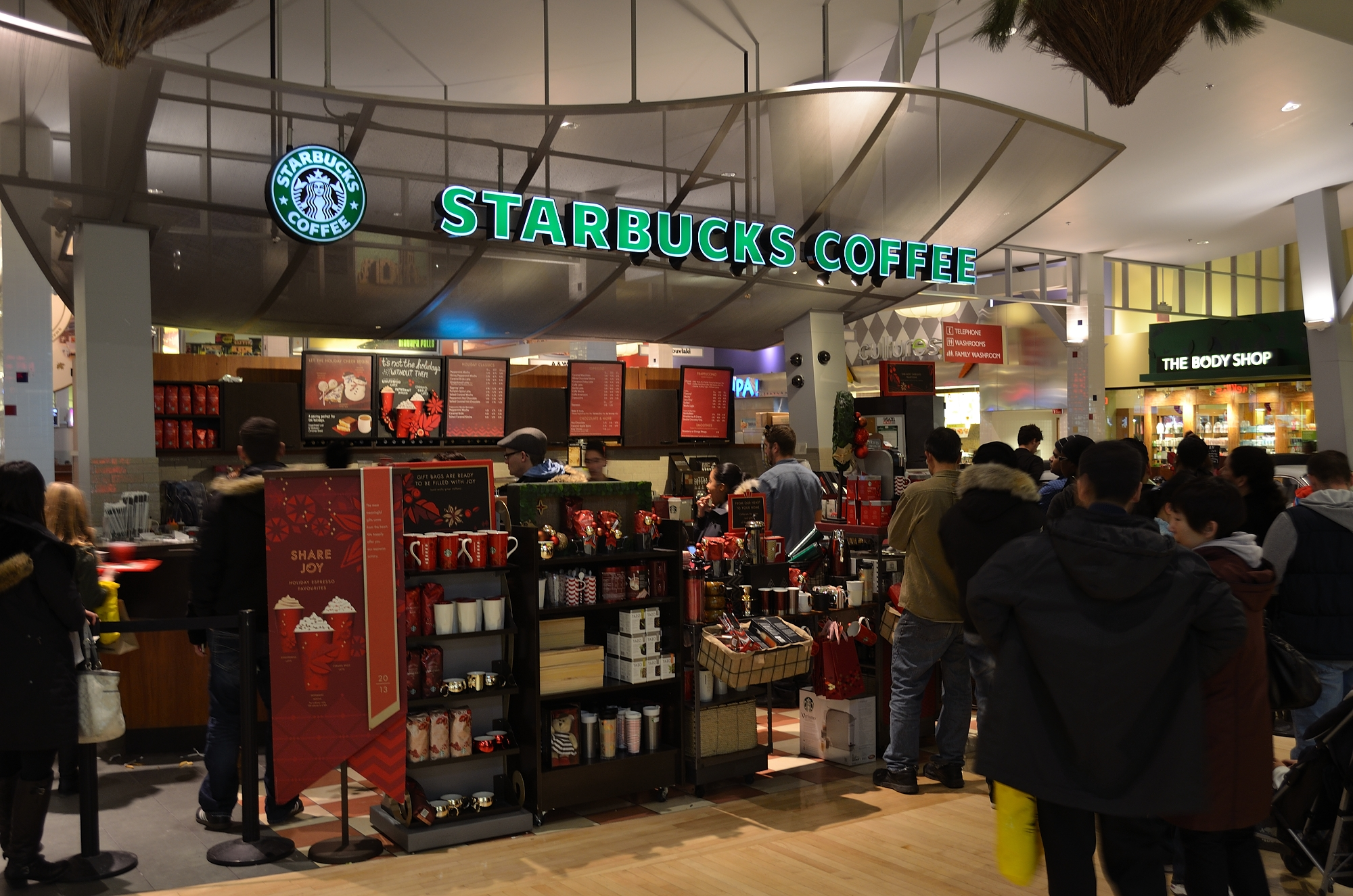
Coffee house – a type of service delivery

The delivery of a service typically involves six factors:

- Service provider (workers and managers)
- Equipment used to provide the service (e.g. vehicles, cash registers, technical systems, computer systems)
- Physical facilities (e.g. buildings, parking, waiting rooms)
- Service consumer
- Other customers at the service delivery location
- Customer contact

The service encounter is defined as all the activities involved in the service delivery process.

Many business theorists view service provision as a performance or act (sometimes humorously referred to as dramalurgy, perhaps in reference to dramaturgy). The location of the service delivery is referred to as the stage and the objects that facilitate the service process are called props. A script is a sequence of behaviors followed by those involved, including the client(s). Some service dramas are tightly scripted, others are more ad lib. Role congruence occurs when each actor follows a script that harmonizes with the roles played by the other actors.

In some service industries, especially health care, dispute resolution and social services, a popular concept is the idea of the caseload, which refers to the total number of patients, clients, litigants, or claimants for which a given employee is responsible. Employees must balance the needs of each individual case against the needs of all other current cases as well as their own needs.

Under English law, if a service provider is induced to deliver services to a dishonest client by a deception, this is an offence under the Theft Act 1978.

Lovelock used the number of delivery sites (whether single or multiple) and the method of delivery to classify services in a 2 x 3 matrix. Then implications are that the convenience of receiving the service is the lowest when the customer has to come to the service and must use a single or specific outlet. Convenience increases (to a point) as the number of service points increase.

== Service-commodity goods continuum ==
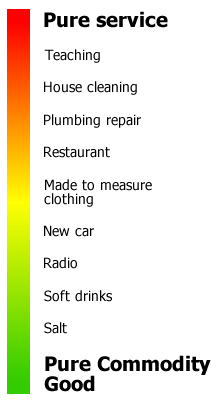
Service-Commodity Goods continuum

The distinction between a good and a service remains disputed. The perspective in the late-eighteenth and early-nineteenth centuries focused on creation and possession of wealth. Classical economists contended that goods were objects of value over which ownership rights could be established and exchanged. Ownership implied tangible possession of an object that had been acquired through purchase, barter or gift from the producer or previous owner and was legally identifiable as the property of the current owner.

Adam Smith's famous book, The Wealth of Nations, published in 1776, distinguished between the outputs of what he termed "productive" and "unproductive" labor. The former, he stated, produced goods that could be stored after production and subsequently exchanged for money or other items of value. The latter, however useful or necessary, created services that perished at the time of production and therefore did not contribute to wealth. Building on this theme, French economist Jean-Baptiste Say argued that production and consumption were inseparable in services, coining the term "immaterial products" to describe them.

In the modern day, Gustofsson & Johnson describe a continuum with pure service on one terminal point and pure commodity good on the other. Most products fall between these two extremes. For example, a restaurant provides a physical good (the food), but also provides services in the form of ambience, the setting and clearing of the table, etc. And although some utilities actually deliver physical goods — like water utilities that deliver water — utilities are usually treated as services.

== Service types ==
The following is a list of service industries, grouped into sectors. Parenthetical notations indicate how specific occupations and organizations can be regarded as service industries to the extent they provide an intangible service, as opposed to a tangible good.

- Business functions (that apply to all organizations in general)
  - Consulting
  - Customer service
  - Human resources administrators (providing services like ensuring that employees are paid accurately)
- Cleaning, patronage, repair and maintenance services
  - Gardeners
  - Janitors (who provide cleaning services)
  - Mechanics
- Construction
  - Carpentry
  - Electricians (offering the service of making wiring work properly)
  - Plumbing
- Death care
  - Coroners (who provide the service of identifying cadavers and determining time and cause of death)
  - Funeral homes (who prepare corpses for public display, cremation or burial)
- Dispute resolution and prevention services
  - Arbitration
  - Courts of law (who perform the service of dispute resolution backed by the power of the state)
  - Diplomacy
  - Incarceration (provides the service of keeping criminals out of society)
  - Law enforcement (provides the service of identifying and apprehending criminals)
  - Lawyers (who perform the services of advocacy and decisionmaking in many dispute resolution and prevention processes)
  - Mediation
  - Military (performs the service of protecting states in disputes with other states)
  - Negotiation (not really a service unless someone is negotiating on behalf of another)
- Education (institutions offering the services of teaching and access to information)
  - Library
  - Museum
  - School
- Entertainment (when provided live or within a highly specialized facility)
  - Gambling
  - Movie theatres (providing the service of showing a movie on a big screen)
  - Performing arts productions
  - Sport
  - Television
- Fabric care
  - Dry cleaning
  - Laundry
- Financial services
  - Accountancy
  - Banks and building societies (offering lending services and safekeeping of money and valuables)
  - Real estate
  - Stock brokerages
  - Tax services
  - Valuation
- Foodservice industry
- Health care (all health care professions provide services)
- Hospitality industry
- Information services
  - Database services
  - Data processing
  - Interpreting
  - Translation
- Logistics
  - Transport
  - Warehousing
  - Stock management
  - Packaging
- Personal grooming
  - Body hair removal
  - Dental hygienist
  - Hairdressing
  - Manicurist / pedicurist
- Public utility
  - Electric power
  - Natural gas
  - Telecommunications
  - Waste management
  - Water industry
- Risk management
  - Insurance
  - Security
- Social services
  - Social work
  - Childcare
  - Elderly care

== Statistics ==
- List of countries by GDP sector composition
- List of countries by service exports and imports

== See also ==
- As a service
- Deliverable
- Intangible good
- Services marketing
- Universal basic services
