= Center for the Development of Recycling =

The Center for the Development of Recycling
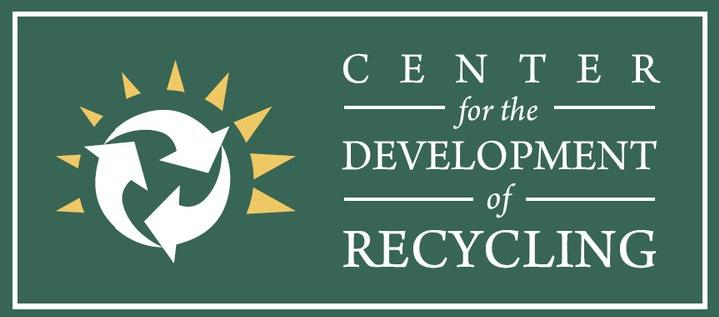
- Type: Non-Profit Organization
- Industry: Recycling service
- Founded: 1989; 37 years ago
- Founder: Bruce Olszewski
- Defunct: June 30, 2024; 2 years ago
- Headquarters: SJSU department of Environmental Studies, San Jose, California, U.S.
- Area served: County of Santa Clara; County of San Mateo
- Services: Providing Recycling Information
- Website: recyclestuff.org

The Center for the Development of Recycling (CDR) was a university-based, non-profit, environmental research and service organization. Established in 1989, the CDR created and operated the recycling hotline for Santa Clara County and established one of nations first recycling services websites, RecycleStuff.org. The website began services in 1999 to the jurisdictions within Santa Clara County and later San Mateo County. The CDR also operated the household hazardous waste (HHW) call center for Santa Clara County making appointments for county residents. Additionally, CDR completed multiple waste reduction projects for local government and industry.

CDR was unique in that it created an opportunity for university students to learn the field of Sustainable Materials Management (SMM) while they assisted the public. Over 100 students have been documented as using CDR experience to earn careers in the field of SMM after graduation from SJSU. Students collected and confirmed data on the website, operated the call center, and worked on contracted projects.

The CDR was located in the Department of Environmental Studies at San Jose State University, and was staffed by faculty-managed service-learning university students. Alumni frequently earned careers in sustainable materials management.

== History ==
The CDR was founded in 1989 by San Jose State Department of Environmental Studies professor Bruce Olszewski. In 1991, CDR improved government efficiency by establishing the Santa Clara County Recycling Hotline. In 1992, the CDR began operating its recycling services directory hotline. CDR added a donor-funded website in 1999. In 2017, CDR expanded its organization to include the County of San Mateo for website management. In 2023 Bruce Olszewski retired, subsequently at the end of the 2023–24 academic year, CDR was disbanded as SJSU unsuccessfully sought his replacement.

== Organization ==
The CDR operated with a part-time Director, three compensated part-time students who served as Administrative Manager, Project Manager, Household Hazardous Waste Manager, as well as a staff of student service-learning interns who earned academic credit. The director of CDR was a Department of Environmental Studies faculty member who adhered to University and public regulations.
