= CCDR (disambiguation) =

CCDR or Canada Communicable Disease Report is an academic journal (first published 1975).

CCDR may also refer to:

- Cross-Cultural Dance Resources, an American non-profit (founded 1981)
- Combatant commander, a U.S. military role (created 1946)

== See also ==
- CDR (disambiguation)
