= Corporate digital responsibility =

Framework of practices and policies

Corporate digital responsibility (CDR) refers to a German and French framework of practices, policies, and behaviors through which organizations responsibly manage their use of data and digital technologies across social, economic, technical, and environmental dimensions. CDR represents an extension of traditional corporate social responsibility (CSR) principles to address the unique challenges and opportunities presented by digital transformation, emphasizing trust, accountability, ethics, and stakeholder engagement in the digital realm.

CDR encompasses regulatory compliance with legal frameworks governing data protection and privacy, ethical considerations around emerging technologies like artificial intelligence, societal responsibilities regarding data management and digital inclusion, and environmental accountability for the ecological impact of digital operations. It addresses digital sustainability, which involves the sustainable management of data and algorithms, alongside comprehensive evaluation of the social, economic, and environmental impacts of digital corporate activities.

== Relationship to CSR ==
CDR evolved from the established concept of Corporate Social Responsibility (CSR), building upon its methodologies, tools, and practical management experiences. While implementation responsibilities often fall to existing CSR officers or sustainability departments, full integration of digital responsibility into traditional CSR frameworks remains incomplete.

This connection reflects the need to extend traditional corporate responsibility concepts to address the unique challenges and opportunities presented by digital technologies, data management, and algorithmic decision-making in the modern business environment.

== Strategic benefits ==
Digital transformation has created competition not only for innovative and viable digital business models but also for stakeholder trust and confidence. A sustainable digital corporate policy serves as a tool for enhancing stakeholder confidence and building long-term relationships. Companies that proactively address stakeholder expectations regarding digital responsibility can secure strategic competitive advantages and establish distinctive market positions.

Effective CDR implementation requires systematic evaluation of social, cultural, environmental, and economic interests as early indicators and drivers of both opportunities and risks within the digital value chain. This proactive approach enables companies to anticipate and respond to emerging challenges while capitalizing on new opportunities in the digital landscape.

Research suggests that CDR can serve as a competitive advantage and differentiation feature, as customers are increasingly aware of data protection issues and there is growing demand for data protection-compliant offerings and interest-compliant data processing policies.

== National approaches ==
=== Germany ===
Interest in CDR has grown significantly among German enterprises, policymakers, and civil society organizations.

==== Government initiatives ====
The German government has recognized the growing importance of corporate digital responsibility through various initiatives. In 2020, the CSR Prize featured a special category "CSR and Digitalization" for the first time.

The Federal Ministry of Justice and Consumer Protection (BMJV) launched the "CDR Initiative" in May 2018, a comprehensive multi-stakeholder platform bringing together companies, policymakers, and researchers to develop concrete recommendations for responsible digitalization practices. The BMJV defines CDR as "voluntary corporate activities that go beyond what is legally required today and actively help shape the digital world for the benefit of society."

In November 2019, the State Secretary Committee for Sustainable Development adopted a resolution on digital policy for sustainable economic activity, emphasizing the high importance of platform economy, data economy, and artificial intelligence.

In June 2021, this initiative released the CDR Code, which clearly delineates principles, action areas, and specific objectives to which member organizations voluntarily commit. The code includes mandatory annual reporting requirements to ensure accountability and progress tracking.

==== Corporate initiatives ====
The "Charta der digitalen Vernetzung" (Charter of Digital Networking), which emerged from an IT summit, established a framework for voluntary commitments in Germany. Approximately 80 enterprises and organizations have endorsed this charter, which outlines ten foundational principles. However, these principles primarily constitute corporate policy statements and lack specific actionable management strategies for implementation.

In early 2018, the "nachhaltig.digital" platform began facilitating cross-industry competence development in CDR specifically for medium-sized enterprises. The same year marked the inaugural "Bits & Bäume" conference on digitalization and sustainability, which featured dedicated sessions on CDR within its "Alternative Economies" track.

In 2020, the "Corporate Digital Responsibility Magazin" was launched by Initiative D21, the establishment of the "Kompetenzzentrum Wirtschaft und digitale Verantwortung" (Center of Excellence for Business and Digital Responsibility) in North Rhine-Westphalia, and the "Zentrum Digitalisierung.Bayern" platform.

DAX companies now regularly report on CDR measures as part of their non-financial statements, reflecting the growing importance of digital responsibility in corporate governance.

=== France ===
France has developed a government-led approach to CDR through France Stratégie, a government policy advisory body. It positions CDR as "a new and unavoidable extension of CSR" addressing the omnipresence of digital technology in modern business. In 2020, it established a comprehensive framework identifying four core areas: regulatory responsibility (data protection and GDPR compliance), ethical responsibility (AI software), societal responsibility (data management and digital inclusion), and environmental responsibility (ecological impacts of digital activities). The French model emphasizes moving beyond minimum regulatory compliance to meet broader stakeholder expectations, promoting collegial decision-making processes involving Data Protection Officers and strategic management bodies, though analysis reveals most French companies still view data governance primarily as compliance rather than accountability. The platform has identified significant coordination gaps between digital and CSR strategies, particularly among SMEs facing resource constraints, and issued 34 recommendations in July 2020 calling for comprehensive training, stronger CSR-digital integration, European-level frameworks, and positioning CDR as essential for addressing democratic, social, and environmental challenges in the digital economy.
