= Climate Data Record =

A Climate Data Record (CDR) is a specific definition of a climate data series, developed by the Committee on Climate Data Records from NOAA Operational Satellites of the National Research Council at the request of NOAA in the context of satellite records. It is defined as "a time series of measurements of sufficient length, consistency, and continuity to determine climate variability and climate change.".

Such measurements provide an objective basis for the understanding and prediction of climate and its variability, such as global warming.

== Interim Climate Data Record (ICDR) ==
An Interim Climate Data Record (ICDR) is a dataset that has been forward processed, using the baselined CDR algorithm and processing environment but whose consistency and continuity have not been verified. Eventually it will be necessary to perform a new reprocessing of the CDR and ICDR parts together to guarantee consistency, and the new reprocessed data record will replace the old CDR.

== Fundamental Climate Data Record (FCDR) ==
A Fundamental Climate Data Record is a long-term data record of calibrated and quality-controlled data designed to allow the generation of homogeneous products that are accurate and stable enough for climate monitoring.

== Examples of CDRs ==
- AVHRR Pathfinder Sea Surface Temperature
- GHRSST-PP Reanalysis Project, on the website for Ghrsst-pp
- Snow and Ice
- NOAA's Climate Data Records homepage

== See also ==
- Temperature record
