= Council on Disaster Reduction =

Technical council of the American Society of Civil Engineers

The Council on Disaster Reduction, or CDR, is one of the 12 technical councils and divisions of the American Society of Civil Engineers (ASCE).

== Purpose ==
The purpose of the ASCE Council on Disaster Reduction is to develop goals and guide actions for ASCE's role in hazard mitigation and disaster reduction by fostering collaboration among civil engineering and other disciplines through programs of technical assistance and technology transfer.

== Leadership ==
The current chair of the Council on Disaster Reduction is James P. Heaney of the University of Florida at Gainesville.

== Technical Committees ==
The Council on Disaster Reduction comprises four Technical Committees as follows:

- Hazard Characterization Committee
- Mitigation Committee
- Response, Rescue and Recovery Committee
- Vulnerability and Risk Committee (VRC)
