= Acidification =

Acidification may refer to:

- Ocean acidification, decrease in the pH of the Earth's oceans
- Freshwater acidification, atmospheric depositions and soil leaching of SOx and NOx
- Soil acidification, buildup of hydrogen cations, which reduces the soil pH
- Souring, a cooking technique
