= Volker Grassmuck =

German sociologist and media researcher (born 1961)

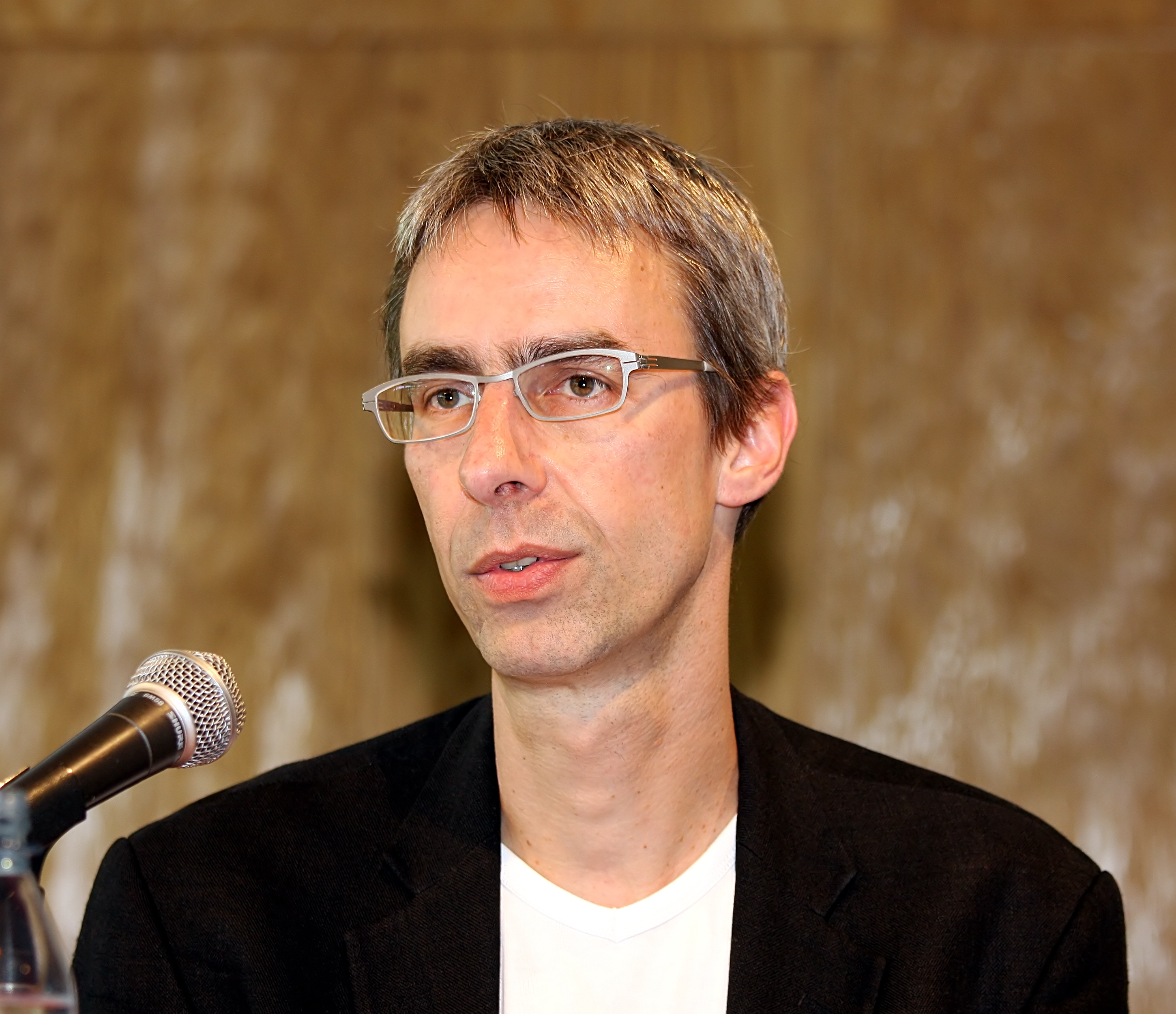
Volker Grassmuck at SIGINT 2009, Cologne

Volker Grassmuck (born 1961 in Hannover) is a German sociologist and media researcher.

Volker Grassmuck visited Herschelschool in Hannover, spent a year at Ridgewood High in New Jersey and finished his Abitur back at Herschelschool in 1980.

He started studying sociology in 1981 in Groningen, Netherlands at the Rijksuniversiteit Groningen but changed to Berlin in 1982. There he studied sociology, journalism, information science and psychology at the Freie Universität Berlin.

In the mid-1980s he worked alongside his studies publicist and founded the "JetSet Verlags GmbH" in 1984, which published the magazine "V max - Zeitschrift auf der Überholspur". He also worked at the local radio station "Radio 100" as editor for the radio show "Nachtflug".

Grassmuck started his academic career in 1987 with contributions to a research project and also graduated his study and started studying Japanese at the FU Berlin as well.

From 1989 he did research at the Socio-technological Research Department of Tokyo University. From 1991 he published a column in the "konpyûta kagaku" (Shujunsha) and worked as a video-editor for ABC News. 1992 found him as a newscaster at Radio Japan, NHK and worked as a freelancer for InterCommunication Magazine, NTT Shuppansha. At the university he researched networks with Dr. Kubota Akihiro.

Grassmuck returned to Berlin in 1995, starting, together with others, "mikro e. V." in 1998, a project for connecting Berlin's media cultures. He worked together with Prof. Dr. Wolfang Coy on a DFG research project on "Von der Ordnung des Wissens zur Wissensordnung digitaler Medien" ("From the system of knowledge to the knowledge system of digital media") at the Humboldt Universität.

He earned a doctorate at the FU Berlin on Japanese media history with the topic "Closed Society. Media and discursive aspects of Japan's 'three openings'". In 2000/2001 he became a replacement professor for media art at the Universität Graphik und Buchkunst in Leipzig.

Grassmuck organized the conference Wizards of OS which topics included operating systems, open sources and open contents. He holds regular lectures at congresses of the German Chaos Computer Club and is engaged in new forms of copyright like Wissensallemende or GNU.
