= Sustainable materials management =

Approach to using and reusing materials more productively over their entire lifecycles

Sustainable Materials Management is a systemic approach to using and reusing materials more productively over their entire lifecycles. It represents a change in how a society thinks about the use of natural resources and environmental protection. By looking at a product's entire lifecycle new opportunities can be found to reduce environmental impacts, conserve resources, and reduce costs.

U.S. and global consumption of materials increased rapidly during the last century. According to the Annex to the G7 Leaders’ June 8, 2015 Declaration, global raw material use rose during the 20th century at about twice the rate of population growth. For every 1 percent increase in gross domestic product, raw material use has risen by 0.4 percent.

This increasing consumption has come at a cost to the environment, including habitat destruction, biodiversity loss, overly stressed fisheries and desertification. Materials management is also associated with an estimated 42 percent of total U.S. greenhouse gas emissions. Failure to find more productive and sustainable ways to extract, use and manage materials, and change the relationship between material consumption and growth, has grave implications for our economy and society.

== Introduction ==
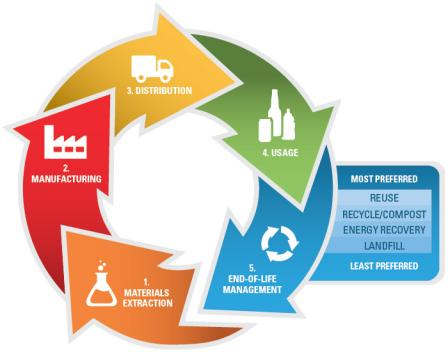
U.S. EPA's SMM lifecycle of materials and products from material extraction, manufacturing, distribution, use and end-of-life.

Sustainable Materials Management (SMM) represents a framework to sustainably manage materials and products throughout the entire lifecycle, from resource extraction, design and manufacturing, resource productivity, consumption and end-of-life management.

Traditional patterns of material consumption in the United States follow a Cradle-to-Grave pattern of raw material extraction, product manufacturing, distribution to consumers, use by consumers, and disposal; coined by The Story of Stuff author Annie Leonard as the "take-make-waste" linear economy and commonly referred to as the throw-away society, these familiar waste management practices are being revised to bring about sustainable management of resources. SMM represents a shift in how materials are used and valued with a focus on the environmental impact of material use and environmental protection throughout the entire lifecycle of a product. SMM has been adopted as a regulatory approach to manage materials by the U.S. Environmental Protection Agency (EPA) and many other governments around the world.

Sustainable Materials Management is a broad approach that overlaps and supplements many programs and concepts being adopted by governments and business around the world including zero waste, green chemistry, eco-labeling, sustainable supply-chain management, lean manufacturing, green procurement, the US EPA’s Design for the Environment Program, the G8’s 3R’s (reduce, reuse, recycle) program, UNEP's Sustainable Production and Consumption and Sustainable Resource Management programs, and OECD's Sustainable Materials Management framework.

=== Differences between Waste Management and SMM ===
- SMM seeks the highest use of all resources while waste management focuses on managing and reducing waste and waste pollutants at the end of the lifecycle
- SMM focuses on the entire lifecycle of materials and products while waste management focuses on just the end-of life management of waste products
- SMM is concerned with inputs and outputs to/from the environment and associated impacts to air and water and is not geographically constrained while waste management only looks at outputs to the environment from waste and areas where waste is managed
- SMM's overall goal is long term sustainability while waste management focuses on managing one environmental impact, that associated with waste products
- SMM considers all industries and consumers associated with the lifecycle of a material and product as a responsible party where as waste management only considers the generators of the waste as the responsible party

== Product Lifecycle Models ==
There are several similar and overlapping efforts to define and conceptualize a closed loop lifecycle of product and materials management, with many of these efforts being spearheaded by government agencies, entrepreneurs, scientists and non-governmental organizations. While similar to SMM, these product lifecycle models focus largely on the end-of-life management of materials while SMM focuses on the impacts materials, products and services have on the environment such as eutrophication, acidification, ozone layer depletion, global warming and aquatic toxicity as well as energy and water use.

=== Product Stewardship ===
The Product Stewardship Institute defines Product stewardship as:

"the act of minimizing the health, safety, environmental, and social impacts of a product and its packaging throughout all lifecycle stages, while also maximizing economic benefits. The manufacturer, or producer, of the product has the greatest ability to minimize adverse impacts, but other stakeholders, such as suppliers, retailers, and consumers, also play a role. Stewardship can be either voluntary or required by law".

British Columbia (BC) has an extensive product stewardship network administered by BC Recycles and composed of BC producers and brand owners who are required by law to collect and divert end-of-life products and packaging.

=== Circular Economy ===
The U.Ks Waste and Resource Action Programme (WRAP) defines the Circular Economy as being an alternative to the traditional take, make, waste economy to one that keeps resources in use as long as possible, extracts the maximum value from the materials while they are in use, then recovers the materials to generate new products at the end of the service life.

The Ellen MacArthur Foundation works to accelerate the transition to a circular economy by working with businesses, academia and governments throughout the world to develop an economy that is restorative and regenerative by design and seeks to keep products, components and materials at their highest use and value at all times, distinguishing between biological and technical cycles.

=== Cradle-to-Cradle ===
The Dictionary of Sustainable Management defines Cradle-to-Cradle as

"A phrase invented by Walter R. Stahel in the 1970s and popularized by William McDonough and Michael Braungart in their 2002 book of the same name. This framework seeks to create production techniques that are not just efficient but are essentially waste free. In cradle-to-cradle production, all material inputs and outputs are seen either as technical or biological nutrients. Technical nutrients can be recycled or reused with no loss of quality and biological nutrients composted or consumed. By contrast cradle-to-grave refers to a company taking responsibility for the disposal of goods it has produced, but not necessarily putting products’ constituent components back into service."

=== Closed Loop Recycling ===
In closed loop recycling, a material is captured at the end of life and introduced back into the manufacturing process to make a new product

== Implementing SMM Globally ==
=== The Organization for Economic Cooperation and Development (OECD) ===
The Organization for Economic Co-operation and Development (OECD) formed in 1960 and currently comprising 35 member countries including the United States, Canada, Mexico, Japan and 23 countries in the European Union, works to foster economic prosperity and end poverty by promoting economic growth and financial stability for governments around the world while also taking into account the implications that economic and social growth have on the environment.

Since the 1980s, the OECD has worked to promote policies that prevent, reduce and manage waste in ways that mitigate environmental impacts. It has become clear over time that increasing economic activity and materials consumptions calls for a systematic materials based approach to managing waste, one that seeks to incorporate materials back into the manufacturing process at the end of their life, in what is commonly referred to as a “cradle to cradle” approach to materials management as opposed to the traditional “cradle to grave” waste management approach. Around 2001 the OECD began to address many countries’ interest in viewing waste as a resource that can be used as inputs for new products and many countries and governments have begun adopting sustainable materials management policies.

In 2012, the OECD put out a Green Growth Policy Brief on Sustainable Materials Management. In it they define SMM as

“…an approach to promote sustainable materials use, integrating actions targeted at reducing negative environmental impacts and preserving natural capital throughout the life-cycle of materials, taking into account economic efficiency and social equity”.

The OECD working definition includes the following notes on the definition of SMM:

- "Materials” include all those extracted or derived from natural resources, which may be either inorganic or organic substances, at all points throughout their life-cycles.
- “Life-cycle of materials” includes all activities related to materials such as extraction, transportation, production, consumption, material/product reuse, recovery, and disposal.
- An economically efficient outcome is achieved when net benefits to society as a whole are maximized.
- A variety of policy tools can support SMM, such as economic, regulatory and information instruments and partnerships.
- SMM may take place at different levels, including firm/sector and different government levels. SMM may cover different geographical areas and time horizons.

=== The United Nations Environment Programme (UNEP) ===
Sustainable Production and Consumption (UNEP)

Sustainable Resource Management (UNEP)

=== The United States Environmental Protection Agency (US EPA) ===
The US EPA has adopted Sustainable Materials Management as a regulatory framework for managing materials. In June 2009 the EPA put out a report that functioned as a road map to SMM in the U.S. titled Sustainable Materials Management - The Road Ahead 2009 - 2020. In this report, EPA defines SMM as

“... an approach to serving human needs by using/reusing resources productively and sustainably throughout their life cycles, generally minimizing the amount of materials involved and all associated environmental impacts”.

The Resource Conservation and Recovery Act (RCRA) sets the legislative basis for SSM in the United States, establishing a preference for resource conservation over disposal. In 2010, the Office of Resource Conservation and Recovery shifted focus from just resource recovery efforts to adopt a broader sustainable materials management approach. The new approach includes the two original waste management mandates of RCRA: 1) to protect human health and the environment from waste and 2) to conserve resources, and adds in three additional goals: 1) to “Reduce waste and increase the efficient and sustainable use of resources”, 2) “Prevent exposures to humans and ecosystems from the use of hazardous chemicals” 3) “Manage wastes and clean up chemical releases in a safe, environmentally sound manner”.

In 2015 EPA published the report EPA Sustainable Materials Management Program Strategic Plan for Fiscal Years 2017 – 2022. This five-year plan will focus on three strategic initiatives:

1. The built environment
2. Organics recycling, and
3. Reduction in packaging

Other areas the EPA will focus on include sustainable electronics management, life-cycle assessment, measurement, and international SMM collaboration.
