= Ghrsst-pp =

The Group for High Resolution SST (GHRSST) is a follow on activity form the Global Ocean Data Assimilation Experiment (GODAE) high-resolution sea surface temperature pilot project. It provides a global high-resolution (<10 km) data products to the operational oceanographic, meteorological, climate and general scientific community, in real time and delayed mode.

Sea surface temperature (SST) measured from satellites in considerable spatial detail and at high frequency, is increasingly required for use in the context of operational monitoring and forecasting of the ocean, for assimilation into coupled ocean-atmosphere model systems and for applications in short-term numerical weather prediction and longer term climate change detection. Currently there are many different SST data sets available derived from satellite systems. But, scientists and operational agencies alike are presented with a bewildering set of options in terms of SST product content, coverage, spatial resolution, timeliness, format and accuracy. The international GODAE steering committee realised that SST data products were not adequate for GODAE forecast systems and initiated the GODAE High Resolution SST Pilot Project (GHRSST-PP). User requirements were collected together to define the optimal SST data products that could be developed to suit the widest possible number of applications. In 2008 the GHRSST-PP Science Team agreed to close the Pilot Project as the GODAE project was completed. A follow on activity called the Group for High Resolution SST is now continuing the coordination of GHRSST activities.

== Purpose ==
The purpose of GHRSST is to develop an operational demonstration system and to drive all scientific aspects related to SST. The activity co-ordinates the delivery of a new generation of global coverage high-resolution (better than 10 km and ~6 hourly) SST data products. GHRSST data products are derived by combining readily available but complementary Level-2 (L2) satellite and in situ observations in real time to improve spatial coverage, temporal resolution, cross-sensor calibration stability and SST product accuracy.

GHRSST is an international activity that orchestrates a wide variety of input and output data. The data are shared, indexed, processed, quality controlled, analysed and documented within an international framework. Large volumes of data and associated data services are harnessed together to deliver the new generation of global coverage high resolution SST data sets.

GHRSST is based on a distributed system in which the data processing operations that are necessary to operationally generate and distribute high resolution SST data sets having global coverage are shared by Regional Data Assembly Centres (RDAC). RDAC ingest, quality control and merge existing satellite and in situ SST data sources that are then merged to generate regional coverage SST data products having the same netCDF format specification (called L2P products), in real-time. RDAC data products are then assembled together at Global Data Analysis Centres (GDAC) where they are merged to provide L4 global coverage data products free of gaps. The distributed processing system is referred to as the GHRSST Regional/Global Task Sharing (R/GTS) framework

The GHRSST Data Processing Specification (GDS) is central to the successful implementation and operation of the R/GTS. It provides a common data processing specification that must be implemented at each GHRSST RDAC and GDAC. It defines clearly the input and output data specifications, data processing procedures, algorithms and data product file formats that are used within the GDS and are thus common to each GHRSST RDAC and GDAC. Conforming to the netCDF CF1.3 specification is a prerequisite if the GHRSST Global/Regional task sharing implementation framework is to function efficiently.

There are great strengths to this approach from a community perspective. For example, a common processing description is necessary to simplify documentation of data, facilitate exchange by sharing a common data format agreed by RDAC, GDAC and users, to avoid significant duplication of effort, to minimise reformatting of different data products derived by RDAC and to ease the integration of RDAC data to provide global coverage data sets at GDAC centres. Operationally produced data products will be improved by using additional data that are only available in a delayed mode together with extensive quality control procedures as part of the GHRSST reanalysis (RAN) project (see http://ghrsst.nodc.noaa.gov).

Today GHRSST is a truly international project with over $24 Million US invested across all of the project activities. A basic 'version-1.0' of the GHRSST Regional/Global Task Sharing (R/GTS) system has been implemented in an internationally distributed manner. Global and regional coverage SST data products are now produced by RDAC in the US, Australia, France, Japan, Denmark, the United Kingdom, Italy and Canada. Products are passed in near real time to a recently operational GDAC at NASA JPL, USA. Research and development within GHRSST projects continue to tackle the problems of diurnal variability, skin temperature deviations and SST validation. Data management teams continue to refine the GHRSST data management structures to provide a functional system that conforms to federal directives (e.g., ISO, FGDC, INSPIRE). A Long Term Data Stewardship and Reanalysis Facility (http://www.nodc.noaa.gov/SatelliteData/ghrsst/ LTSRF) is operated by the NOAA National Center for Environmental Information in collaboration with the JPL GDAC (http://ghrsst.jpl.nasa.gov). The GHRSST-PP International Project Office, jointly funded by the European Space Agency and Met Office, UK, continues to manage the international co-ordination of the project. GHRSST operates a Multi Product Ensemble (GMPE) of operational SST and Sea Ice analyses of the world which contributes a formal action of the Group on Earth Observations (GEO).

Most importantly, an international user community has emerged that is now testing and applying GHRSST data products and services within scientific projects and operational systems - all in real time. Over 20GB of data is exchanged within the international project each day! The challenge for GHRSST version-1 R/GTS and the Science Team that is responsible for its design and implementation is to deliver sustained production of stable, high-quality, SST data products and services and grow the user community. Only a user community can demonstrate a requirement for sustained operations. Once that point is reached, the GHRSST will have achieved its aim.
