= Vulnerability and Risk Committee =

The Vulnerability and Risk Committee, or VRC, is one of the four technical committees within the Council on Disaster Reduction of the American Society of Civil Engineers.

== Purpose ==
The purpose of the Vulnerability and Risk Committee is to develop goals and guide actions for ASCE's role in hazard mitigation and disaster reduction by fostering collaboration among civil engineering and other disciplines through programs of technical assistance and technology transfer.

== Goals ==
1. Enhance the understanding of the nature of hazards, vulnerability and risk, and related challenges faced by decision makers.

2. Offer initiative and leadership in a timely manner to respond to national and international disasters.

3. Review and recommend methodologies across hazards and elements of the natural and built environment for various applications and decision situations.

4. Organize and coordinate national and international workshops, symposia and conferences that lead to the development of publications, including monographs.

5. Engage in related activities as deemed appropriate by the committee

== Leadership ==
The current leadership team of the Vulnerability and Risk Committee is as follows:

- Chair: Professor Bilal M. Ayyub of the Center for Technology and Systems Management in the Department of Civil and Environmental Engineering at the University of Maryland, College Park
- Vice Chair: Professor Nii Attoh-Okine of the Department of Civil and Environmental Engineering at the University of Delaware
- Secretary: Professor William L. McGill of the College of Information Sciences and Technology at the Pennsylvania State University
