= Common Data Representation =

Common Data Representation (CDR) is used to represent structured or primitive data types passed as arguments or results during remote invocations on Common Object Request Broker Architecture (CORBA) distributed objects.

It enables clients and servers written in different programming languages to work together. For example, it translates little-endian to big-endian. It assumes prior agreement on type, so no information is given with data representation in messages.
