= Intangible good =

Goods without physical nature

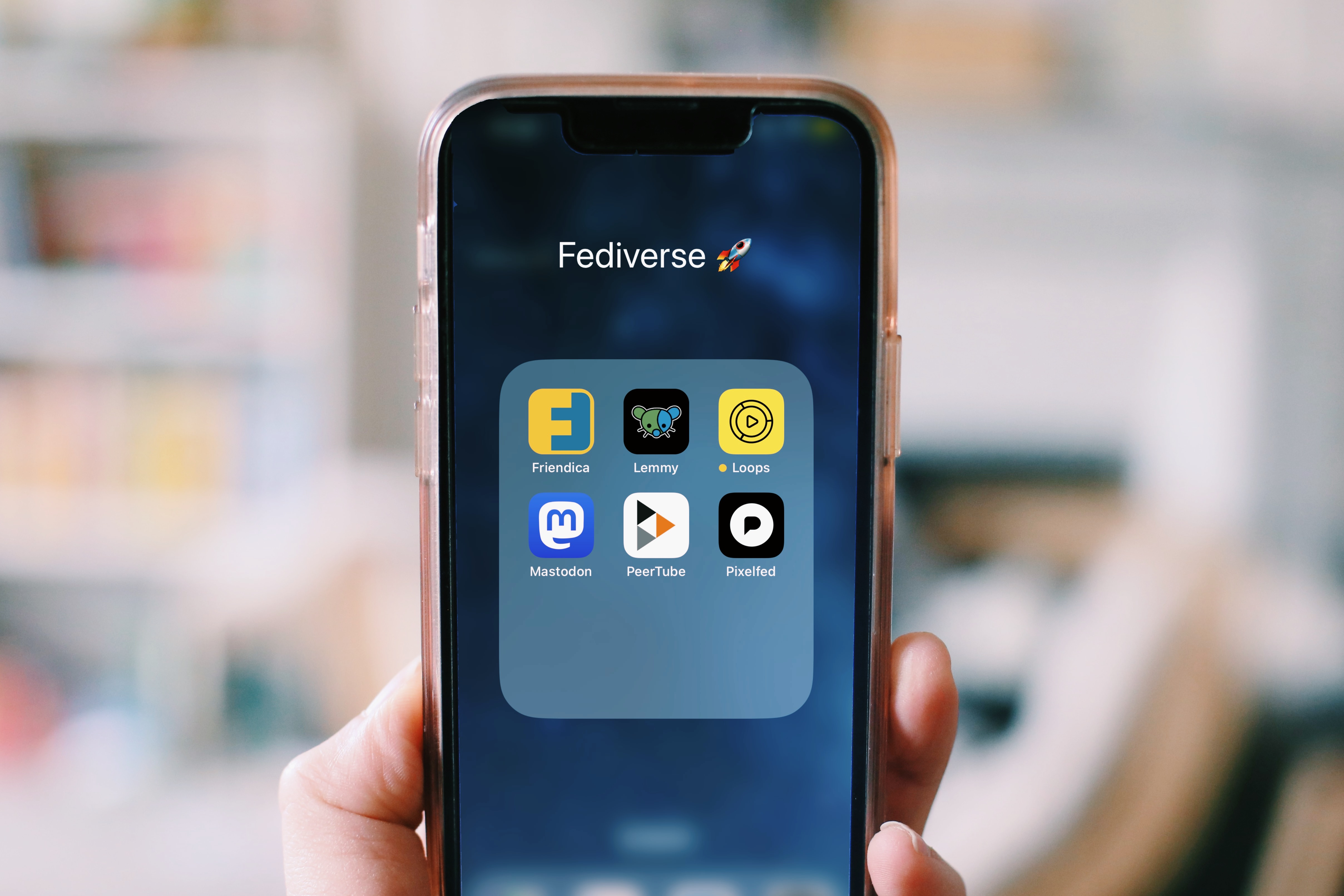
The downloadable mobile apps shown on this smartphone screen are intangible goods because they have no physical presence.

An intangible good is something that provides utility which does not have a physical nature, as opposed to a physical good (an object). Intangible goods do not have a physical presence, but "ownership rights exist for them (established with patents and copyrights), they can be stored, and their ownership transferred."

Digital goods such as downloadable music, mobile apps or virtual goods used in virtual economies are proposed to be examples of intangible goods. Other examples of intangible goods include "scientific inventions, and "originals" such as the words in a book manuscript or the images stored on a film master." Another example of a category of intangible goods is intellectual property.

In contrast, tangible goods have a physical presence. Examples include newspapers, music CDs, and movie DVDs. These are the "physical expression of intangible goods that can be copyrighted."

== See also ==
- Service-goods continuum
