= List of countries by GDP sector composition =

This is the list of countries by purely nominal gross domestic product (GDP) sector composition. The article has three main sectors: agricultural, industrial, and service.

== By economic sector ==
=== Nominal GDP sector composition ===
Nominal GDP sector composition (billions of USD$) by percentage of sector
Country/Economy	Total GDP (USD$)	Agricultural		Industrial		Service	
Country/Economy	Total GDP (USD$)	USD$	%	USD$	%	USD$	%
World	104,480	4,437,549	5.9%	22,939,872	30.5%	47,835,275	63.6%
United States	29,160	215,364	1.2%	3,427,876	19.1%	14,303,756	79.7%
China	17,700	843,061	6.9%	4,899,531	40.1%	6,463,471	52.9%
Germany	9,430	27,959	0.8%	982,067	28.1%	2,484,874	71.1%
Japan	4,735	56,764	1.2%	1,300,833	27.5%	3,377,434	71.4%
India	3,730	649,020	17.4%	962,340	25.8%	2,122,370	56.9%
United Kingdom	3,330	18,549	0.7%	556,477	21.0%	2,074,864	78.3%
France	3,050	47,277	1.9%	455,355	18.3%	1,985,647	79.8%
Italy	2,190	37,050	2.0%	448,305	24.2%	1,367,145	73.8%
Brazil	2,130	95,558	5.4%	484,870	27.4%	1,189,171	67.2%
Canada	2,120	27,582	1.8%	438,249	28.6%	1,066,509	69.6%
Russia	1,860	49,442	3.9%	456,390	36.0%	761,918	60.1%
Mexico	1,810	39,354	3.7%	363,755	34.2%	660,502	62.1%
South Korea	1,710	37,918	2.7%	558,943	39.8%	807,519	57.5%
Australia	1,690	50,266	4.0%	334,266	26.6%	872,108	69.4%
Spain	1,580	41,321	3.3%	303,023	24.2%	909,068	72.6%
Indonesia	1,420	134,556	14.3%	441,307	46.9%	365,090	38.8%
Turkey	1,150	67,259	8.9%	212,356	28.1%	476,101	63.0%
Netherlands	1,090	21,558	2.8%	185,553	24.1%	563,589	73.2%
Saudi Arabia	1,070	13,156	2.0%	440,058	66.9%	204,571	31.1%
Switzerland	905.7	8,612	1.3%	183,508	27.7%	470,363	71.0%
Poland	842.2	15,890	3.4%	157,030	33.6%	294,431	63.0%
Taiwan	751.9	6,749	1.3%	166,128	32.0%	347,311	66.9%
Belgium	627.5	3,291	0.7%	101,559	21.6%	365,329	77.7%
Argentina	621.8	54,178	10.0%	166,328	30.7%	320,736	59.2%
Sweden	597.1	9,314	1.8%	139,191	26.9%	368,935	71.3%
Norway	546.8	10,159	2.7%	144,111	38.3%	221,998	59.0%
Austria	526.2	5,809	1.5%	114,253	29.5%	267,236	69.0%
Thailand	512.2	51,949	13.3%	132,801	34.0%	205,842	52.7%
United Arab Emirates	509.2	2,915	0.7%	247,368	59.4%	165,745	39.8%
Denmark	462.0	15,624	4.5%	66,314	19.1%	265,258	76.4%
Nigeria	390.0	73,884	17.8%	106,676	25.7%	226,634	54.6%
South Africa	380.9	8,530	2.5%	107,824	31.6%	224,861	65.9%
Iran	366.4	46,182	11.2%	167,410	40.6%	198,748	48.2%
Colombia	363.8	35,610	8.9%	152,044	38.0%	212,462	53.1%
Greece	242.4	8,131	3.3%	44,105	17.9%	194,407	78.9%
Venezuela	92.2	9,834	4.7%	73,020	34.9%	126,373	60.4%

=== Real GDP sector composition ===
GDP sector composition, 2017 (in% and millions of dollars) using the PPP methodology
Country/Economy	Total GDP (US$MM)	Agricultural		Industrial		Service	
Country/Economy	Total GDP (US$MM)	USD$	%	USD$	%	USD$	%
World	127,800,000	8,179,200	6.4%	38,340,000	30.0%	80,514,000	63.6%
China	23,210,000	1,833,590	7.9%	9,400,050	40.5%	11,976,360	51.6%
European Union	20,850,111	333,600	1.6%	5,233,350	25.1%	14,782,650	70.9%
United States	19,490,000	175,410	0.9%	3,722,590	19.1%	15,592,000	80.0%
India	9,474,000	1,458,996	15.4%	2,179,020	23.0%	5,826,510	61.6%
Japan	5,443,000	59,873	1.1%	1,638,343	30.1%	3,739,341	68.7%
Germany	4,199,000	29,393	0.7%	1,289,093	30.7%	2,880,514	68.6%
Russia	4,016,000	188,752	4.7%	1,301,184	32.4%	2,501,968	62.3%
Indonesia	3,250,000	445,250	13.7%	1,332,500	41.0%	1,475,500	45.4%
Brazil	3,248,000	214,368	6.6%	672,336	20.7%	2,361,296	72.7%
France	2,956,000	49,484	0.7%	633,473	20.2%	2,377,684	79.2%
United Kingdom	2,925,000	20,475	0.7%	590,850	20.2%	2,316,600	79.2%
Mexico	2,463,000	88,668	3.6%	785,697	31.9%	1,588,635	64.5%
Italy	2,317,000	48,657	2.1%	553,763	23.9%	1,712,263	73.9%
Turkey	2,186,000	148,648	6.8%	706,078	32.3%	1,326,902	60.7%
South Korea	2,035,000	44,770	2.2%	799,755	39.3%	1,186,405	58.3%
Spain	1,778,000	46,228	2.6%	412,496	23.2%	1,319,276	74.2%
Saudi Arabia	1,775,000	46,150	2.6%	784,550	44.2%	944,300	53.2%
Canada	1,774,000	28,384	1.6%	500,268	28.2%	1,245,348	70.2%
Iran	1,640,000	157,440	9.6%	578,920	35.3%	902,000	55.0%
Australia	1,248,000	44,928	3.6%	315,744	25.3%	888,576	71.2%
Thailand	1,236,000	101,352	8.2%	447,432	36.2%	687,216	55.6%
Egypt	1,204,000	140,868	11.7%	412,972	34.3%	650,160	54.0%
Taiwan	1,189,000	21,402	1.8%	428,040	36.0%	738,369	62.1%
Poland	1,126,000	27,024	2.4%	452,652	40.2%	646,324	57.4%
Nigeria	1,121,000	236,531	21.1%	252,225	22.5%	632,244	56.4%
Pakistan	1,061,000	258,884	24.4%	202,651	19.1%	599,465	56.5%
Malaysia	933,300	82,130	8.8%	350,921	37.6%	500,249	53.6%
Netherlands	924,400	14,790	1.6%	165,468	17.9%	648,929	80.2%
Argentina	922,100	99,587	10.8%	259,110	28.1%	563,403	61.1%
Philippines	877,200	84,211	9.6%	268,423	30.6%	524,566	59.8%
South Africa	767,200	21,482	2.8%	227,858	29.7%	517,860	67.5%
Colombia	711,600	51,235	7.2%	219,173	30.8%	441,904	62.1%
United Arab Emirates	696,000	6,264	0.9%	346,608	49.8%	342,432	49.2%
Bangladesh	690,300	98,023	14.2%	202,258	29.3%	390,020	56.5%
Iraq	649,300	21,427	3.3%	331,143	51.0%	297,379	45.8%
Vietnam	648,700	99,251	15.3%	216,017	33.3%	332,783	51.3%
Algeria	630,000	83,790	13.3%	247,590	39.3%	298,620	47.4%
Belgium	529,200	3,704	0.7%	116,953	22.1%	408,542	77.2%
Singapore	528,100	0	0.0%	130,969	24.8%	397,131	75.2%
Switzerland	523,100	3,662	0.7%	133,914	25.6%	385,525	73.7%
Sweden	518,000	8,288	1.6%	170,940	33.0%	338,772	65.4%
Romania	483,400	20,303	4.2%	160,489	33.2%	302,608	62.6%
Kazakhstan	478,600	22,494	4.7%	163,203	34.1%	292,903	61.2%
Hong Kong	455,900	456	0.1%	34,648	7.6%	420,796	92.3%
Chile	452,100	18,988	4.2%	148,289	32.8%	284,823	63.0%
Austria	441,000	5,733	1.3%	125,244	28.4%	310,023	70.3%
Peru	430,300	32,703	7.6%	140,708	32.7%	257,750	59.9%
Venezuela	381,600	17,935	4.7%	154,166	40.4%	209,498	54.9%
Norway	381,200	8,768	2.3%	128,464	33.7%	243,968	64.0%
Czechia	375,900	8,646	2.3%	138,707	36.9%	228,547	60.8%
Ukraine	369,600	45,091	12.2%	105,706	28.6%	221,760	60.0%
Ireland	353,300	4,240	1.2%	136,374	38.6%	212,687	60.2%
Qatar	339,500	679	0.2%	170,769	50.3%	168,053	49.5%
Myanmar	329,800	79,482	24.1%	117,409	35.6%	132,909	40.3%
Israel	317,100	7,610	2.4%	84,032	26.5%	220,385	69.5%
Portugal	314,100	6,910	2.2%	69,416	22.1%	237,774	75.7%
Greece	299,300	12,271	4.1%	50,582	16.9%	236,746	79.1%
Morocco	298,600	41,804	14.0%	88,087	29.5%	168,709	56.5%
Kuwait	289,700	1,159	0.4%	170,054	58.7%	118,487	40.9%
Hungary	289,600	11,294	3.9%	90,645	31.3%	187,661	64.8%
Denmark	287,800	3,741	1.3%	65,906	22.9%	218,152	75.8%
Sri Lanka	275,800	21,512	7.8%	84,119	30.5%	170,169	61.7%
Finland	244,900	6,612	2.7%	69,062	28.2%	169,226	69.1%
Uzbekistan	223,000	39,917	17.9%	75,151	33.7%	108,155	48.5%
Ethiopia	200,600	69,809	34.8%	43,330	21.6%	87,462	43.6%
Angola	193,600	19,747	10.2%	118,870	61.4%	54,982	28.4%
Ecuador	193,000	12,931	6.7%	63,497	32.9%	116,572	60.4%
Oman	190,100	3,422	1.8%	88,206	46.4%	98,472	51.8%
New Zealand	189,000	10,773	5.7%	40,635	21.5%	137,592	72.8%
Slovakia	179,700	6,829	3.8%	62,895	35.0%	109,976	61.2%
Belarus	179,400	14,531	8.1%	73,195	40.8%	91,673	51.1%
Sudan	177,400	70,250	39.6%	4,612	2.6%	102,537	57.8%
Dominican Republic	173,000	9,688	5.6%	57,090	33.0%	106,222	61.4%
Azerbaijan	172,200	10,504	6.1%	92,127	53.5%	69,569	40.4%
Kenya	163,700	56,477	34.5%	29,139	17.8%	77,758	47.5%
Tanzania	162,500	38,025	23.4%	46,475	28.6%	77,350	47.6%
Bulgaria	153,500	6,601	4.3%	42,980	28.0%	103,459	67.4%
Guatemala	138,100	18,367	13.3%	32,315	23.4%	87,279	63.2%
Tunisia	137,700	13,908	10.1%	36,077	26.2%	87,853	63.8%
Cuba	137,000	5,480	4.0%	31,099	22.7%	100,558	73.4%
Ghana	134,000	24,522	18.3%	32,830	24.5%	76,648	57.2%
Puerto Rico	130,000	1,040	0.8%	65,130	50.1%	63,830	49.1%
Serbia	105,700	10,359	9.8%	43,443	41.1%	51,899	49.1%
Panama	104,100	2,498	2.4%	16,344	15.7%	85,362	82.0%
Turkmenistan	103,700	7,778	7.5%	46,561	44.9%	49,465	47.7%
Croatia	102,100	3,778	3.7%	26,750	26.2%	71,572	70.1%
Côte d'Ivoire	97,160	19,529	20.1%	25,845	26.6%	51,786	53.3%
Lithuania	91,470	3,201	3.5%	26,892	29.4%	61,468	67.2%
Cameroon	89,540	14,953	16.7%	23,728	26.5%	50,859	56.8%
Uganda	89,190	25,152	28.2%	18,819	21.1%	45,219	50.7%
Jordan	89,000	4,005	4.5%	25,632	28.8%	59,274	66.6%
Paraguay	88,910	15,915	17.9%	24,628	27.7%	48,456	54.5%
Lebanon	88,250	3,442	3.9%	11,561	13.1%	73,248	83.0%
Costa Rica	83,940	4,617	5.5%	17,292	20.6%	62,032	73.9%
Bolivia	83,720	11,553	13.8%	31,646	37.8%	40,353	48.2%
Nepal	79,190	21,381	27.0%	10,691	13.5%	47,118	59.5%
Uruguay	78,160	4,846	6.2%	18,837	24.1%	54,478	69.7%
Yemen	73,630	14,947	20.3%	8,688	11.8%	49,995	67.9%
Macao	71,820	0	0.0%	4,525	6.3%	67,295	93.7%
Slovenia	71,230	1,282	1.8%	22,936	32.2%	46,941	65.9%
Bahrain	71,170	214	0.3%	27,970	39.3%	42,987	60.4%
Afghanistan	69,450	15,974	23.0%	14,654	21.1%	38,823	55.9%
Zambia	68,930	5,170	7.5%	24,332	35.3%	39,290	57.0%
DR Congo	68,600	13,514	19.7%	29,910	43.6%	25,176	36.7%
Cambodia	64,210	16,245	25.3%	21,061	32.8%	26,904	41.9%
Luxembourg	62,110	186	0.3%	7,950	12.8%	53,974	86.9%
Libya	61,970	806	1.3%	32,410	52.3%	28,754	46.4%
Senegal	54,800	9,261	16.9%	13,316	24.3%	32,222	58.8%
Latvia	54,020	2,107	3.9%	12,100	22.4%	39,813	73.7%
El Salvador	51,170	6,140	12.0%	14,174	27.7%	30,856	60.3%
Syrian Arab Republic	50,280	10,056	20.0%	9,805	19.5%	30,570	60.8%
Laos	49,340	10,312	20.9%	16,381	33.2%	22,647	45.9%
Honduras	46,300	6,575	14.2%	13,334	28.8%	26,391	57.0%
Bosnia and Herzegovina	44,830	3,048	6.8%	12,956	28.9%	28,826	64.3%
Trinidad and Tobago	42,850	171	0.4%	20,482	47.8%	22,153	51.7%
Estonia	41,650	1,166	2.8%	12,162	29.2%	28,364	68.1%
Mali	41,220	17,230	41.8%	7,461	18.1%	16,694	40.5%
North Korea	40,000	9,000	22.5%	19,040	47.6%	11,960	29.9%
Georgia	39,850	3,268	8.2%	9,444	23.7%	27,058	67.9%
Madagascar	39,850	9,564	24.0%	7,771	19.5%	22,475	56.4%
Mongolia	39,730	4,807	12.1%	15,177	38.2%	19,746	49.7%
Botswana	39,010	702	1.8%	10,728	27.5%	27,541	70.6%
Mozambique	37,090	8,865	23.9%	7,158	19.3%	21,067	56.8%
Gabon	36,660	1,833	5.0%	16,387	44.7%	18,477	50.4%
Nicaragua	36,400	5,642	15.5%	8,882	24.4%	21,840	60.0%
Albania	36,010	7,814	21.7%	8,714	24.2%	19,481	54.1%
Burkina Faso	35,850	11,114	31.0%	8,568	23.9%	16,097	44.9%
Zimbabwe	34,270	4,112	12.0%	7,608	22.2%	22,550	65.8%
Brunei	33,870	406	1.2%	19,170	56.6%	14,327	42.3%
Cyprus	31,780	636	2.0%	3,973	12.5%	27,172	85.5%
Equatorial Guinea	31,520	788	2.5%	17,210	54.6%	13,522	42.9%
North Macedonia	31,030	3,382	10.9%	8,254	26.6%	19,394	62.5%
Papua New Guinea	30,190	6,672	22.1%	12,952	42.9%	10,567	35.0%
Congo	29,390	2,733	9.3%	14,989	51.0%	11,668	39.7%
Chad	28,620	14,968	52.3%	4,207	14.7%	9,473	33.1%
Tajikistan	28,430	8,131	28.6%	7,250	25.5%	13,049	45.9%
Armenia	28,340	4,733	16.7%	7,992	28.2%	15,530	54.8%
Mauritius	28,270	1,131	4.0%	6,163	21.8%	20,948	74.1%
Guinea	27,970	5,538	19.8%	8,978	32.1%	13,454	48.1%
Namibia	26,600	1,782	6.7%	6,996	26.3%	17,822	67.0%
Jamaica	26,060	1,824	7.0%	5,499	21.1%	18,737	71.9%
Benin	25,390	6,627	26.1%	5,789	22.8%	12,974	51.1%
Rwanda	24,680	7,626	30.9%	4,344	17.6%	12,710	51.5%
Moldova	23,720	4,198	17.7%	4,815	20.3%	14,706	62.0%
Kyrgyzstan	23,150	3,380	14.6%	7,223	31.2%	12,547	54.2%
Malawi	22,420	6,412	28.6%	3,453	15.4%	12,555	56.0%
Niger	21,860	9,094	41.6%	4,263	19.5%	8,460	38.7%
Somalia	20,440	12,305	60.2%	1,513	7.4%	6,643	32.5%
Haiti	19,970	4,413	22.1%	4,054	20.3%	11,503	57.6%
Kosovo	19,600	2,332	11.9%	3,469	17.7%	13,798	70.4%
Malta	19,260	212	1.1%	1,965	10.2%	17,084	88.7%
Iceland	18,180	1,054	5.8%	3,581	19.7%	13,562	74.6%
Mauritania	17,280	4,804	27.8%	5,063	29.3%	7,413	42.9%
Togo	12,970	3,735	28.8%	2,827	21.8%	6,459	49.8%
Bahamas	12,060	277	2.3%	929	7.7%	10,854	90.0%
Eswatini	11,600	754	6.5%	5,220	45.0%	5,638	48.6%
Sierra Leone	11,550	7,011	60.7%	751	6.5%	3,800	32.9%
New Caledonia	11,110	156	1.4%	2,933	26.4%	8,010	72.1%
Montenegro	11,080	831	7.5%	1,762	15.9%	8,487	76.6%
Eritrea	9,402	1,100	11.7%	2,783	29.6%	5,519	58.7%
Suriname	8,688	1,008	11.6%	2,702	31.1%	4,987	57.4%
Fiji	8,629	1,165	13.5%	1,501	17.4%	5,963	69.1%
Burundi	8,007	3,163	39.5%	1,313	16.4%	3,539	44.2%
Monaco	7,672	0	0.0%	1,074	14.0%	6,598	86.0%
Timor-Leste	7,426	676	9.1%	4,211	56.7%	2,555	34.4%
Bhutan	7,205	1,167	16.2%	3,012	41.8%	3,026	42.0%
Maldives	6,901	207	3.0%	1,104	16.0%	5,590	81.0%
Isle of Man	6,792	68	1.0%	883	13.0%	5,841	86.0%
Lesotho	6,656	386	5.8%	2,609	39.2%	3,654	54.9%
Guyana	6,301	970	15.4%	964	15.3%	4,367	69.3%
Bermuda	6,127	55	0.9%	325	5.3%	5,747	93.8%
Liberia	6,112	2,078	34.0%	843	13.8%	3,190	52.2%
Jersey	5,569	111	2.0%	111	2.0%	5,346	96.0%
Gambia	5,556	1,133	20.4%	789	14.2%	3,634	65.4%
French Polynesia	5,490	137	2.5%	714	13.0%	4,639	84.5%
Barbados	5,218	78	1.5%	511	9.8%	4,628	88.7%
Liechtenstein	4,978	348	7.0%	2,041	41.0%	2,589	52.0%
Aruba	4,158	17	0.4%	1,385	33.3%	2,757	66.3%
Cabo Verde	3,777	336	8.9%	661	17.5%	2,784	73.7%
Djibouti	3,640	87	2.4%	630	17.3%	2,919	80.2%
Guernsey	3,465	104	3.0%	347	10.0%	3,015	87.0%
Central African Republic	3,390	1,464	43.2%	542	16.0%	1,383	40.8%
Andorra	3,327	396	11.9%	1,118	33.6%	1,813	54.5%
Belize	3,218	331	10.3%	695	21.6%	2,188	68.0%
Guinea-Bissau	3,171	1,586	50.0%	415	13.1%	1,170	36.9%
Curaçao	3,128	22	0.7%	485	15.5%	2,621	83.8%
Seychelles	2,750	69	2.5%	380	13.8%	2,302	83.7%
Saint Lucia	2,542	74	2.9%	361	14.2%	2,105	82.8%
Cayman Islands	2,507	8	0.3%	186	7.4%	2,314	92.3%
Greenland	2,413	384	15.9%	244	10.1%	1,783	73.9%
Antigua and Barbuda	2,398	43	1.8%	499	20.8%	1,854	77.3%
San Marino	2,064	2	0.1%	809	39.2%	1,253	60.7%
Gibraltar	2,044	0	0.0%	0	0.0%	2,044	100.0%
Faroe Islands	2,001	360	18.0%	780	39.0%	860	43.0%
Grenada	1,634	111	6.8%	253	15.5%	1,270	77.7%
Saint Kitts and Nevis	1,550	17	1.1%	465	30.0%	1,068	68.9%
Solomon Islands	1,330	456	34.3%	101	7.6%	773	58.1%
Comoros	1,319	629	47.7%	156	11.8%	534	40.5%
Saint Vincent and the Grenadines	1,265	90	7.1%	220	17.4%	955	75.5%
Northern Mariana Islands	1,242	21	1.7%	722	58.1%	499	40.2%
Samoa	1,137	118	10.4%	268	23.6%	750	66.0%
Dominica	783	175	22.3%	99	12.6%	510	65.1%
Vanuatu	772	211	27.3%	91	11.8%	469	60.8%
Sao Tome and Principe	686	81	11.8%	102	14.8%	504	73.4%
American Samoa	658	180	27.4%	82	12.4%	396	60.2%
Turks and Caicos Islands	632	3	0.5%	56	8.9%	573	90.6%
Tonga	591	118	19.9%	120	20.3%	353	59.8%
Saint Martin (French part)	562	6	1.0%	84	15.0%	472	84.0%
British Virgin Islands	500	1	0.2%	34	6.8%	466	93.1%
Sint Maarten (Dutch part)	366	1	0.4%	67	18.3%	298	81.3%
Micronesia	348	92	26.3%	66	18.9%	191	54.8%
Cook Islands	300	15	5.1%	38	12.7%	246	82.1%
Palau	264	8	3.0%	50	19.0%	206	78.0%
Saint Pierre and Miquelon	261	5	2.0%	39	15.0%	217	83.0%
Kiribati	227	52	23.0%	16	7.0%	159	70.0%
Marshall Islands	196	9	4.4%	19	9.9%	168	85.7%
Anguilla	175	5	3.0%	18	10.5%	151	86.4%
Montserrat	167	3	1.9%	13	7.8%	151	90.3%
Nauru	160	10	6.1%	53	33.0%	97	60.8%
Tuvalu	42	10	24.5%	2	5.6%	29	70.0%
Niue	10	2	23.5%	3	26.9%	5	49.5%

=== Nominal GDP sector composition (2005 constant prices) ===
Total natural resources rents (% of GDP) by country, 2013

Oil rents (% of GDP) by country, 2013

Nominal GDP sector composition, 2015 (in millions of 2005 USD): 2005 prices are used similarly to 2010 constant prices in which they provide economic statistics where inflation is accounted for.

Country/Economy	Real GDP (US$MM)	Agricultural (US$MM)	Industrial (US$MM)	Service (US$MM)
World	60,093,221	1,968,215	16,453,140	38,396,695
United States	15,160,104	149,023	3,042,332	11,518,980
China	5,762,185	418,455	2,837,667	2,467,184
Japan	5,018,510	59,296	1,415,551	3,502,804
Germany	3,291,225	15,946	889,336	2,064,936
United Kingdom	2,821,007	15,482	468,181	2,032,516
France	2,406,570	39,823	415,400	1,727,659
Italy	1,766,169	38,145	369,751	1,196,180
India	1,677,339	196,592	499,519	849,240
Canada	1,377,908	22,761	370,732	896,605
Brazil	1,130,906	59,977	267,769	655,172

== GDP from natural resources ==
Source: World Development Indicators: Contribution of natural resources to gross domestic product (2011, source unavailable)

GDP from natural resources (% of GDP)
Country/Economy	Total	Oil	Natural Gas	Coal	Mineral	Forest
Afghanistan	2.1	–	–	0.0	0.0	2.1
Albania	5.1	4.6	0.0	0.0	0.5	0.1
Algeria	26.3	19.0	7.0	0.0	0.3	0.1
Angola	46.6	46.3	0.1	–	0.0	0.2
Antigua and Barbuda	0.0	–	–	–	0.0	–
Argentina	6.1	4.1	1.2	0.0	0.8	0.1
Armenia	2.7	–	–	–	2.7	0.0
Australia	10.7	0.8	0.7	1.9	7.2	0.1
Austria	0.4	0.1	0.0	0.0	0.1	0.1
Azerbaijan	45.1	41.9	3.1	–	0.1	0.0
Bahamas	0.0	–	–	–	0.0	0.0
Bangladesh	3.4	–	2.8	0.1	0.0	0.5
Barbados	0.0	–	–	–	0.0	–
Belarus	2.4	1.8	0.0	–	0.0	0.5
Belgium	0.0	–	–	0.0	0.0	0.0
Belize	0.3	–	–	–	0.0	0.3
Benin	1.7	–	–	–	0.0	1.6
Bhutan	8.4	–	–	0.0	0.0	8.4
Bolivia	20.6	5.4	8.6	–	6.3	0.3
Bosnia and Herzegovina	4.5	–	–	3.1	0.8	0.6
Botswana	4.7	–	–	0.4	4.2	0.1
Brazil	5.7	2.6	0.1	0.0	2.8	0.3
Brunei	41.0	28.5	12.5	–	0.0	0.1
Bulgaria	3.9	0.0	0.1	1.6	2.0	0.3
Burkina Faso	11.8	–	–	–	9.1	2.7
Burundi	10.3	–	–	–	1.2	9.0
Cambodia	1.3	–	–	–	0.0	1.3
Cameroon	9.8	8.0	0.2	0.0	0.2	1.5
Canada	5.1	3.2	0.2	0.2	1.0	0.5
Cape Verde	0.1	–	–	–	0.0	0.1
Central African Republic	5.1	–	–	–	0.1	5.0
Chad	38.4	36.8	–	–	0.0	1.6
Chile	19.2	0.1	0.1	0.0	18.6	0.4
China	9.1	1.6	0.1	4.4	2.8	0.2
Hong Kong	0.0	–	–	–	0.0	0.0
Macao	0.0	–	–	–	0.0	–
Colombia	12.1	8.8	0.4	1.8	1.0	0.1
Comoros	1.1	–	–	–	0.0	1.1
Democratic Republic of Congo	35.2	4.4	0.0	0.1	22.0	8.8
Republic of Congo	73.7	71.5	0.0	–	0.0	2.1
Costa Rica	0.3	–	–	–	0.0	0.3
Cote d'Ivoire	7.7	4.4	1.0	–	1.2	1.1
Croatia	1.2	0.6	0.4	0.0	0.0	0.2
Cyprus	0.0	–	–	–	0.0	0.0
Czech Republic	1.1	0.0	0.0	0.8	0.0	0.2
Denmark	2.4	2.1	0.3	0.0	0.0	0.0
Dominica	0.0	–	–	–	0.0	0.0
Dominican Republic	0.7	–	–	–	0.6	0.0
Ecuador	26.0	25.6	0.1	–	0.0	0.3
Egypt	12.7	8.2	4.0	0.0	0.4	0.1
El Salvador	0.5	–	–	–	0.0	0.5
Equatorial Guinea	41.4	41.1	–	–	0.0	0.3
Eritrea	0.6	–	–	–	0.0	0.5
Estonia	3.1	–	–	2.2	0.0	0.9
Eswatini	1.6	–	–	0.0	0.0	1.6
Ethiopia	6.0	–	–	–	1.1	4.8
Fiji	1.7	–	–	–	0.7	0.9
Finland	0.9	–	–	–	0.2	0.7
France	0.1	0.0	0.0	0.0	0.0	0.1
Gabon	50.6	47.9	0.2	–	0.1	2.4
Gambia	2.3	–	–	–	0.0	2.3
Georgia	0.8	0.2	0.0	0.0	0.5	0.1
Germany	0.3	0.0	0.0	0.1	0.0	0.1
Ghana	14.3	3.2	–	–	9.6	1.4
Greece	0.6	0.0	0.0	0.4	0.1	0.0
Grenada	0.0	–	–	–	0.0	–
Guatemala	2.8	0.8	–	–	1.2	0.8
Guinea	20.1	–	–	–	16.0	4.1
Guinea-Bissau	4.6	–	–	–	0.0	4.6
Guyana	16.2	–	–	–	14.9	1.3
Haiti	0.7	–	–	–	0.0	0.7
Honduras	2.0	–	–	–	0.9	1.1
Hungary	0.8	0.3	0.2	0.2	0.0	0.1
Iceland	0.0	–	–	–	0.0	0.0
India	7.4	1.3	0.3	3.1	2.0	0.6
Indonesia	10.0	3.0	0.8	4.0	1.6	0.6
Iran	27.9	22.0	5.0	0.0	0.9	0.0
Iraq	78.5	77.7	0.8	–	0.0	0.0
Ireland	0.2	–	0.0	0.0	0.1	0.0
Israel	0.4	0.0	0.3	0.0	0.2	0.0
Italy	0.2	0.1	0.0	0.0	0.0	0.0
Jamaica	1.7	–	–	–	1.6	0.1
Japan	0.0	0.0	0.0	0.0	0.0	0.0
Jordan	2.8	0.0	0.1	–	2.7	0.0
Kazakhstan	38.2	27.5	2.5	5.8	2.5	0.0
Kenya	1.4	–	–	–	0.1	1.3
Kiribati	0.0	–	–	–	0.0	–
South Korea	0.1	0.0	0.0	0.0	0.0	0.0
Kosovo	2.9	–	–	–	2.9	–
Kuwait	51.3	49.9	1.4	–	0.0	0.0
Kyrgyzstan	12.8	0.6	0.0	0.5	11.7	0.0
Laos	16.8	–	–	0.0	15.2	1.5
Latvia	1.4	–	–	–	0.0	1.4
Lebanon	0.0	–	–	–	0.0	0.0
Lesotho	1.3	–	–	–	0.0	1.3
Liberia	11.0	–	–	–	2.3	8.7
Lithuania	1.9	0.2	–	–	0.0	1.7
Luxembourg	0.1	–	–	–	0.1	0.0
Madagascar	5.7	–	–	–	3.9	1.8
Malawi	3.9	–	–	–	0.0	3.9
Malaysia	10.3	6.4	3.1	0.1	0.2	0.6
Maldives	0.0	–	–	–	0.0	0.0
Mali	14.2	–	–	–	13.2	1.0
Malta	0.0	–	–	–	0.0	–
Marshall Islands	0.0	–	–	–	0.0	–
Mauritania	58.5	–	–	–	58.0	0.5
Mauritius	0.0	–	–	–	0.0	0.0
Mexico	9.0	7.2	0.6	0.1	1.1	0.1
Micronesia, Fed. Sts.	0.0	–	–	–	0.0	–
Moldova	0.2	0.1	–	–	0.0	0.1
Mongolia	46.0	2.1	–	26.5	17.2	0.2
Montenegro	0.0	–	–	–	0.0	–
Morocco	4.1	0.0	0.0	0.0	4.0	0.1
Mozambique	7.2	–	4.2	0.0	0.2	2.7
Namibia	1.4	–	–	–	1.3	0.1
Nepal	3.0	–	–	0.0	0.0	3.0
Netherlands	1.1	0.1	1.0	0.0	0.0	0.0
New Zealand	3.0	0.9	0.4	0.2	0.6	0.9
Nicaragua	2.3	–	–	–	0.9	1.4
Niger	2.4	–	–	0.0	0.5	1.9
Nigeria	15.2	12.3	2.1	0.0	0.0	0.7
North Macedonia	6.0	–	–	1.5	4.5	0.1
Norway	13.6	10.8	2.7	0.0	0.0	0.1
Oman	45.3	40.2	5.1	–	0.0	0.0
Pakistan	3.8	1.0	2.0	0.1	0.1	0.6
Palau	0.0	–	–	–	0.0	–
Panama	0.8	–	–	–	0.7	0.1
Papua New Guinea	36.1	–	–	–	32.5	3.5
Paraguay	1.1	–	–	–	0.0	1.1
Peru	13.6	1.9	1.0	0.0	10.6	0.1
Philippines	3.6	0.1	0.3	0.4	2.6	0.2
Poland	2.6	0.1	0.1	1.5	0.7	0.2
Portugal	0.4	–	–	0.0	0.2	0.1
Qatar	28.6	14.4	14.2	–	0.0	–
Romania	2.6	1.3	0.7	0.4	0.0	0.2
Russian Federation	22.0	15.4	3.2	1.4	1.7	0.3
Rwanda	3.3	–	–	–	0.2	3.0
Samoa	0.3	–	–	–	0.0	0.3
Sao Tome and Principe	0.9	–	–	–	0.0	0.9
Saudi Arabia	58.7	55.5	3.1	–	0.0	0.0
Senegal	3.4	–	0.0	–	2.3	1.1
Serbia	3.8	1.1	0.1	2.3	0.4	–
Seychelles	0.0	–	–	–	0.0	0.0
Sierra Leone	3.6	–	–	–	1.0	2.6
Singapore	0.0	–	–	–	0.0	0.0
Slovak Republic	0.4	0.0	0.0	0.1	0.0	0.3
Slovenia	0.4	–	0.0	0.2	0.0	0.2
Solomon Islands	14.1	–	–	–	0.0	14.1
South Africa	10.6	–	0.0	5.7	4.2	0.7
Spain	0.1	0.0	0.0	0.0	0.0	0.0
Sri Lanka	0.4	–	–	–	0.0	0.4
St. Kitts and Nevis	0.0	–	–	–	0.0	–
St. Lucia	0.0	–	–	–	0.0	–
St. Vincent and the Grenadines	0.0	–	–	–	0.0	0.0
Sudan	15.1	14.2	–	–	0.2	0.7
Suriname	11.7	–	–	–	11.5	0.2
Sweden	1.2	–	–	0.0	0.7	0.5
Switzerland	0.0	–	–	–	0.0	0.0
Tajikistan	1.6	0.2	0.1	0.3	1.0	0.0
Tanzania	8.4	–	0.5	0.0	5.6	2.2
Thailand	4.0	2.2	1.3	0.2	0.1	0.3
Timor-Leste	0.2	–	–	–	0.0	0.2
Togo	4.8	–	–	0.0	2.9	1.9
Tonga	0.0	–	–	–	0.0	0.0
Trinidad and Tobago	37.6	13.2	24.5	–	0.0	0.0
Tunisia	6.8	4.3	0.9	–	1.4	0.1
Turkey	0.8	0.2	0.0	0.2	0.3	0.1
Turkmenistan	43.9	21.3	22.6	–	0.0	–
Tuvalu	0.0	–	–	–	0.0	–
Uganda	5.4	–	–	–	0.0	5.4
Ukraine	6.1	0.9	1.3	3.6	0.0	0.2
United Arab Emirates	24.2	21.9	2.3	–	0.0	–
United Kingdom	1.5	1.2	0.2	0.1	0.0	0.0
United States	1.7	0.9	0.0	0.5	0.2	0.1
Uruguay	0.9	–	–	–	0.1	0.7
Uzbekistan	27.9	3.3	15.1	0.2	9.3	0.0
Vanuatu	0.5	–	–	–	0.0	0.5
Venezuela	32.5	30.0	1.5	0.1	1.0	0.0
Vietnam	13.6	7.8	1.1	3.4	0.6	0.7
Yemen	23.1	18.7	4.4	–	0.0	0.0
Zambia	27.0	–	–	0.0	25.6	1.3
Zimbabwe	6.9	–	–	2.8	2.4	1.6
World	5.7	3.1	0.5	1.0	1.0	0.2

== Central Intelligence Agency ==
Note: Figures may not total 100% due to non-allocated consumption not captured in sector-reported data.

Country/Economy	Agriculture	Industry	Services	Year
Afghanistan	34.7	13.4	46.4	2023
Albania	15.5	22.4	48.9	2024
Algeria	13.1	37.8	45.6	2023
Andorra	0.5	12.8	77.6	2024
Angola	16.4	44.2	39.3	2024
Antigua and Barbuda	1.9	19.0	69.1	2023
Argentina	6.0	24.0	53.4	2024
Armenia	7.9	23.2	61.5	2024
Aruba	0.0	11.4	78.3	2019
Australia	2.2	26.0	65.5	2024
Austria	1.2	23.1	65.3	2024
Azerbaijan	5.7	42.6	42.3	2024
Bahamas, The	0.5	9.6	77.2	2024
Bahrain	0.3	43.4	51.9	2023
Bangladesh	11.2	34.1	51.4	2024
Barbados	1.9	13.2	75.4	2023
Belarus	6.9	30.7	49.7	2024
Belgium	0.8	17.6	72.1	2024
Belize	8.1	14.3	62.4	2024
Benin	24.2	17.4	48.9	2024
Bermuda	0.2	4.6	91.5	2023
Bhutan	15.0	29.6	52.7	2023
Bolivia	13.5	24.2	51.1	2023
Bosnia and Herzegovina	4.3	22.0	58.0	2024
Botswana	1.7	29.4	63.5	2024
Brazil	5.6	21.3	59.3	2024
Brunei	1.2	61.7	38.7	2024
Bulgaria	2.1	22.5	62.6	2024
Burkina Faso	18.6	29.7	40.2	2024
Burma	20.8	37.8	41.4	2024
Burundi	25.3	9.6	49.0	2023
Cambodia	16.6	41.8	35.6	2024
Cameroon	17.4	25.6	49.9	2024
Canada	1.6	25.3	66.4	2021
Cape Verde	4.7	10.5	69.4	2024
Cayman Islands	0.5	8.2	85.4	2022
Central African Republic	32.5	17.8	40.5	2024
Chad	32.2	29.7	31.6	2024
Chile	3.9	30.1	56.1	2024
China	6.8	36.5	56.7	2024
Colombia	9.3	23.1	58.2	2024
Comoros	36.6	9.6	50.1	2024
Congo, Democratic Republic of the	17.1	46.6	33.0	2024
Congo, Republic of the	9.4	40.1	45.0	2024
Costa Rica	3.6	19.7	68.8	2024
Cote d'Ivoire	17.9	22.1	53.9	2024
Croatia	3.4	19.8	59.7	2024
Cuba	1.3	27.5	70.0	2023
Curacao	0.3	11.7	73.3	2023
Cyprus	1.2	10.3	76.9	2024
Czech Republic	1.5	30.2	59.5	2024
Denmark	0.7	24.0	64.0	2024
Djibouti	2.6	15.4	75.5	2024
Dominica	12.2	13.9	56.9	2024
Dominican Republic	4.5	28.7	59.8	2024
Ecuador	9.5	26.5	57.2	2024
Egypt	13.7	32.6	48.9	2024
El Salvador	4.4	22.4	61.0	2024
Equatorial Guinea	3.1	45.8	51.1	2024
Estonia	1.9	20.5	65.1	2024
Eswatini	6.8	34.7	51.7	2023
Ethiopia	34.9	25.4	37.6	2024
European Union	1.6	22.1	66.1	2024
Faroe Islands	18.2	19.7	52.0	2023
Fiji	8.4	14.1	56.2	2024
Finland	2.5	22.1	62.9	2024
France	1.4	17.5	70.4	2024
French Polynesia	2.2	10.6	75.9	2020
Gabon	6.2	50.9	37.5	2024
Gambia	24.1	14.7	53.9	2024
Georgia	5.7	17.4	58.3	2022
Germany	0.8	25.8	63.9	2024
Ghana	20.7	28.8	43.9	2024
Greece	3.3	15.4	68.0	2024
Greenland	16.6	18.4	61.0	2023
Grenada	2.7	14.8	65.2	2024
Guatemala	9.8	21.7	61.8	2024
Guernsey	0.6	8.2	91.2	2023
Guinea	29.6	25.3	37.5	2024
Guinea-Bissau	36.8	16.6	42.1	2024
Guyana	8.0	74.3	15.3	2024
Haiti	15.9	33.4	48.3	2024
Honduras	11.2	26.1	58.4	2024
Hong Kong	0.0	6.3	91.4	2023
Hungary	2.4	23.9	59.7	2024
Iceland	4.0	19.4	65.5	2024
India	16.4	24.5	49.9	2024
Indonesia	12.6	39.3	43.8	2024
Iran	13.0	36.4	47.9	2024
Iraq	3.4	51.6	45.8	2024
Ireland	1.1	30.8	61.8	2024
Isle of Man	0.4	6.9	95.1	2022
Israel	1.3	17.3	72.5	2024
Italy	2.0	21.7	65.6	2024
Jamaica	9.8	18.3	60.3	2024
Japan	0.9	28.6	69.8	2023
Jersey	0.6	8.2	91.2	2023
Jordan	5.1	25.1	60.4	2024
Kazakhstan	3.9	31.4	58.2	2024
Kenya	21.3	16.1	55.9	2024
Kiribati	27.8	9.9	65.7	2022
Kosovo	6.9	26.2	45.7	2024
Kuwait	0.5	57.1	55.9	2024
Kyrgyzstan	8.6	24.7	52.1	2024
Laos	16.8	29.0	43.5	2024
Latvia	4.1	19.9	63.1	2024
Lebanon	1.0	2.1	42.4	2023
Lesotho	6.5	31.0	48.0	2024
Liberia	33.6	23.3	42.1	2024
Libya	1.7	68.3	34.3	2024
Liechtenstein	0.2	40.6	55.6	2022
Lithuania	2.6	23.4	63.6	2024
Luxembourg	0.2	9.0	81.9	2024
Macau	–	5.4	91.4	2023
Madagascar	22.5	22.8	46.4	2024
Malawi	32.4	16.0	44.9	2024
Malaysia	8.2	37.1	53.6	2024
Maldives	3.0	9.0	73.8	2024
Mali	33.4	22.7	36.7	2024
Malta	0.2	11.4	80.8	2024
Marshall Islands	19.5	11.1	70.5	2023
Mauritania	18.6	30.6	43.2	2024
Mauritius	4.3	17.8	64.4	2024
Mexico	3.8	31.6	58.2	2024
Micronesia	23.3	5.0	69.2	2023
Moldova	7.1	16.8	62.3	2024
Monaco	–	11.5	88.5	2023
Mongolia	7.4	38.1	44.2	2024
Montenegro	5.2	11.6	62.1	2024
Morocco	10.1	24.1	54.1	2024
Mozambique	26.3	24.6	38.4	2024
Namibia	7.3	28.9	54.5	2024
Nepal	21.9	11.4	55.2	2024
Netherlands	1.7	17.9	70.3	2024
New Caledonia	1.8	22.3	65.2	2019
New Zealand	4.6	19.6	67.4	2022
Nicaragua	14.4	27.6	46.8	2024
Niger	33.8	17.8	45.4	2024
Nigeria	20.4	29.6	47.0	2024
North Macedonia	6.0	22.7	59.2	2024
Norway	2.0	37.0	51.8	2024
Oman	2.6	54.2	46.5	2024
Pakistan	23.5	20.0	50.5	2024
Palau	3.0	9.9	76.7	2023
Palestine	5.7	17.4	58.3	2022
Panama	2.6	26.3	68.8	2024
Papua New Guinea	17.2	37.2	41.5	2024
Paraguay	10.7	32.5	48.7	2024
Peru	6.1	32.2	52.7	2024
Philippines	9.1	27.7	63.2	2024
Poland	2.6	26.4	59.9	2024
Portugal	2.0	18.4	66.4	2024
Puerto Rico	0.7	48.0	51.5	2024
Qatar	0.3	58.5	45.9	2024
Romania	3.3	25.0	62.5	2024
Russia	2.7	30.7	57.5	2024
Rwanda	24.6	21.0	47.6	2024
Saint Kitts and Nevis	1.3	21.1	65.5	2024
Saint Lucia	1.1	9.8	75.9	2024
Saint Vincent and the Grenadines	3.5	15.4	66.4	2024
Samoa	11.0	10.9	72.5	2024
San Marino	0.0	37.6	55.1	2022
Sao Tome and Principe	12.8	2.9	76.6	2024
Saudi Arabia	2.5	44.8	47.2	2024
Senegal	15.5	25.4	49.1	2024
Serbia	3.1	23.3	58.5	2024
Seychelles	2.5	12.3	65.8	2024
Sierra Leone	25.4	27.3	44.8	2024
Singapore	0.0	21.4	73.0	2024
Sint Maarten	–	6.0	89.3	2021
Slovakia	2.0	28.5	60.0	2024
Slovenia	1.5	28.8	58.2	2024
Solomon Islands	33.8	18.7	47.3	2022
South Africa	2.9	24.4	62.7	2024
South Korea	1.6	31.6	58.4	2023
South Sudan	10.4	33.1	56.6	2015
Spain	2.5	19.5	69.1	2024
Sri Lanka	8.3	25.5	57.5	2024
Sudan	22.1	23.0	54.9	2024
Suriname	7.5	39.9	48.3	2023
Sweden	1.1	22.6	65.9	2024
Switzerland	0.6	24.7	72.0	2024
Syria	43.1	12.0	44.9	2022
Tajikistan	22.9	33.6	34.7	2023
Tanzania	23.4	28.7	28.4	2024
Thailand	8.7	32.1	59.2	2024
Timor-Leste	16.9	23.9	61.0	2023
Togo	18.0	20.0	52.0	2024
Tonga	17.5	13.5	50.2	2023
Trinidad and Tobago	0.8	35.0	59.9	2023
Tunisia	9.3	23.6	62.1	2023
Turkey	5.6	25.9	56.8	2024
Turkmenistan	11.3	39.3	49.4	2023
Turks and Caicos Islands	0.4	9.3	72.6	2024
Tuvalu	15.9	7.0	70.0	2015
Uganda	24.7	24.9	43.1	2024
Ukraine	7.1	19.0	60.6	2024
United Arab Emirates	0.7	47.7	51.6	2023
United Kingdom	0.6	16.7	72.8	2024
United States	0.9	17.3	79.7	2024
Uruguay	6.4	16.8	65.3	2024
Uzbekistan	18.3	31.8	45.2	2024
Vanuatu	24.9	7.5	60.4	2022
Vietnam	11.9	37.6	42.4	2024
Yemen	28.7	25.4	41.8	2018
Zambia	1.8	37.5	55.1	2024
Zimbabwe	5.4	31.8	55.8	2024
World	4.0	26.0	66.2	2024

== GDP (PPP) per person employed by sector ==
=== Percentage of GDP and total employment ===
GDP (PPP) per person employed by sector, 2015
Country	% of GDP			% of total employment		
Country	Agriculture	Industry	Services	Agriculture	Industry	Services
Afghanistan	21.4%	22.9%	55.7%	61.6%	9.9%	28.5%
Albania	22.9%	24.2%	53.0%	42.3%	18.1%	39.6%
United Arab Emirates	0.7%	44.1%	55.1%	3.6%	21.5%	74.9%
Argentina	6.0%	28.1%	65.9%	2.1%	24.7%	73.3%
Armenia	19.3%	28.8%	52.0%	35.3%	15.9%	48.8%
Australia	2.6%	25.4%	72.0%	2.8%	21.8%	75.5%
Austria	1.2%	28.1%	70.7%	4.8%	25.7%	69.5%
Azerbaijan	6.8%	49.3%	43.9%	36.4%	14.1%	49.6%
Burundi	40.4%	16.5%	43.1%	91.2%	2.6%	6.2%
Belgium	0.8%	22.2%	77.1%	1.2%	21.3%	77.5%
Benin	25.3%	23.2%	51.4%	43.6%	10.2%	46.2%
Burkina Faso	33.7%	21.2%	45.1%	80.3%	4.9%	14.9%
Bangladesh	15.5%	28.1%	56.3%	42.9%	18.7%	38.5%
Bulgaria	4.8%	27.9%	67.3%	6.9%	29.9%	63.2%
Bahrain	0.3%	40.7%	59.0%	1.0%	33.6%	65.4%
Bahamas	0.9%	11.2%	87.8%	3.8%	14.3%	81.9%
Bosnia and Herzegovina	7.6%	27.3%	65.1%	18.5%	30.4%	51.1%
Belarus	7.2%	37.7%	55.1%	9.5%	33.0%	57.5%
Belize	14.9%	16.8%	68.3%	15.9%	16.2%	67.9%
Bolivia	13.2%	32.6%	54.2%	30.5%	20.9%	48.6%
Brazil	5.0%	22.3%	72.7%	14.9%	21.6%	63.5%
Barbados	1.5%	9.6%	88.9%	2.9%	19.3%	77.8%
Brunei	1.1%	61.4%	37.5%	0.6%	19.0%	80.4%
Bhutan	17.5%	43.2%	39.3%	58.0%	9.7%	32.4%
Botswana	2.4%	33.1%	64.4%	26.4%	14.9%	58.7%
Central African Republic	42.4%	16.4%	41.2%	72.6%	4.3%	23.2%
Switzerland	0.7%	25.9%	73.4%	3.5%	20.4%	76.1%
Chile	4.3%	32.4%	63.3%	9.6%	23.1%	67.3%
China	8.8%	40.9%	50.2%	28.9%	23.7%	47.3%
Cote d'Ivoire	25.5%	28.9%	45.6%	57.2%	5.5%	37.3%
Cameroon	16.1%	27.4%	56.6%	62.4%	8.7%	28.9%
Congo, Dem. Rep.	20.4%	35.2%	44.4%	65.6%	6.0%	28.4%
Congo, Rep.	7.2%	54.7%	38.1%	41.2%	26.2%	32.7%
Colombia	6.6%	33.4%	59.9%	13.7%	16.9%	69.4%
Cabo Verde	10.2%	20.0%	69.8%	28.2%	11.2%	60.5%
Costa Rica	5.4%	22.1%	72.5%	12.3%	19.2%	68.5%
Cyprus	2.1%	11.1%	86.8%	4.1%	16.9%	78.9%
Czech Republic	2.5%	37.8%	59.7%	2.6%	37.7%	59.7%
Germany	0.6%	30.5%	68.9%	1.4%	27.8%	70.8%
Denmark	0.9%	22.7%	76.4%	2.5%	19.2%	78.3%
Dominican Republic	5.8%	27.3%	66.9%	13.8%	17.2%	69.0%
Algeria	12.6%	38.8%	48.6%	11.4%	35.1%	53.5%
Ecuador	10.2%	34.4%	55.4%	25.0%	19.3%	55.7%
Egypt	11.3%	36.2%	52.5%	25.8%	25.1%	49.1%
Spain	2.8%	23.6%	73.6%	4.1%	19.7%	76.2%
Estonia	3.1%	27.8%	69.1%	3.8%	29.9%	66.3%
Eswatini	10.2%	38.1%	51.6%	22.1%	16.9%	61.0%
Ethiopia	39.2%	17.7%	43.0%	71.4%	8.0%	20.6%
Finland	2.5%	27.0%	70.4%	4.3%	22.0%	73.7%
Fiji	11.3%	17.9%	70.7%	22.2%	2.9%	74.9%
France	1.8%	19.6%	78.6%	2.8%	20.7%	76.6%
Gabon	4.7%	50.8%	44.5%	16.6%	19.1%	64.3%
United Kingdom	0.7%	20.0%	79.3%	1.2%	18.7%	80.0%
Georgia	9.1%	24.7%	66.2%	45.3%	11.4%	43.4%
Ghana	21.0%	27.6%	51.4%	43.4%	14.4%	42.2%
Guinea	20.8%	28.9%	50.3%	69.6%	7.0%	23.4%
Gambia	18.3%	14.2%	67.5%	30.2%	13.7%	56.0%
Guinea-Bissau	49.5%	13.2%	37.3%	60.9%	5.7%	33.4%
Equatorial Guinea	2.0%	57.9%	40.0%	17.6%	19.2%	63.2%
Greece	4.2%	15.6%	80.1%	13.2%	14.9%	71.9%
Guatemala	11.1%	28.1%	60.8%	32.6%	18.5%	48.9%
Guyana	34.5%	6.6%	58.9%	19.0%	25.5%	55.5%
Honduras	13.6%	27.9%	58.5%	30.0%	21.6%	48.5%
Croatia	4.2%	26.4%	69.4%	9.5%	27.1%	63.5%
Hungary	4.4%	31.7%	63.9%	4.5%	30.3%	65.2%
Indonesia	13.9%	41.3%	44.7%	32.9%	22.2%	44.9%
India	17.5%	29.6%	52.9%	46.0%	24.2%	29.8%
Ireland	1.0%	41.4%	57.7%	5.4%	20.4%	74.2%
Iran	10.8%	33.8%	55.4%	18.0%	32.5%	49.4%
Iraq	4.7%	41.5%	53.8%	20.3%	20.7%	59.0%
Iceland	6.3%	22.7%	71.1%	4.3%	18.2%	77.5%
Israel	1.3%	21.0%	77.7%	1.1%	18.2%	80.7%
Italy	2.2%	23.5%	74.2%	3.6%	27.2%	69.2%
Jamaica	7.5%	22.8%	69.7%	18.2%	15.1%	66.7%
Jordan	4.2%	29.6%	66.2%	2.0%	17.7%	80.3%
Japan	1.1%	28.9%	70.0%	3.8%	26.8%	69.4%
Kazakhstan	5.0%	32.5%	62.5%	18.0%	20.6%	61.4%
Kenya	33.3%	19.1%	47.6%	62.6%	8.4%	29.0%
Kyrgyzstan	15.9%	28.4%	55.6%	29.3%	20.9%	49.8%
Cambodia	28.6%	29.8%	41.5%	44.1%	19.5%	36.4%
South Korea	2.3%	38.3%	59.4%	5.2%	25.1%	69.7%
Kuwait	0.5%	51.6%	47.9%	2.7%	27.6%	69.8%
Lebanon	3.8%	16.7%	79.5%	8.2%	22.1%	69.7%
Liberia	34.4%	12.5%	53.1%	45.5%	11.6%	43.0%
St. Lucia	2.4%	13.0%	84.6%	15.0%	17.5%	67.6%
Sri Lanka	8.8%	29.5%	61.7%	28.5%	26.3%	45.3%
Lesotho	5.5%	36.6%	57.8%	40.6%	19.8%	39.6%
Lithuania	3.6%	29.8%	66.5%	9.1%	25.1%	65.9%
Luxembourg	0.3%	12.5%	87.2%	1.4%	10.5%	88.1%
Latvia	4.1%	22.3%	73.6%	7.6%	23.5%	68.9%
Morocco	14.3%	29.5%	56.2%	33.5%	20.5%	45.9%
Moldova	14.4%	14.4%	71.2%	28.4%	31.9%	39.6%
Madagascar	25.6%	15.7%	58.7%	74.5%	9.1%	16.4%
Maldives	6.5%	10.3%	83.3%	8.1%	23.1%	68.8%
Mexico	3.6%	32.7%	63.6%	13.5%	25.1%	61.4%
Mali	42.0%	19.8%	38.3%	57.3%	14.9%	27.8%
Malta	1.3%	15.2%	83.5%	1.3%	22.4%	76.3%
Myanmar	26.8%	34.5%	38.8%	26.2%	14.0%	59.8%
Montenegro	9.7%	17.4%	72.9%	7.8%	17.6%	74.7%
Mongolia	14.5%	33.8%	51.7%	28.5%	20.3%	51.3%
Mozambique	25.2%	21.6%	53.2%	75.3%	4.1%	20.6%
Mauritania	27.7%	28.6%	43.7%	40.6%	9.6%	49.9%
Mauritius	3.6%	21.7%	74.7%	7.5%	25.4%	67.1%
Malawi	29.7%	16.0%	54.3%	69.9%	4.7%	25.4%
Malaysia	8.5%	39.1%	52.4%	12.5%	27.5%	60.0%
Namibia	6.5%	31.0%	62.5%	30.4%	14.7%	54.8%
Niger	39.4%	19.2%	41.4%	62.4%	14.4%	23.3%
Nigeria	20.9%	20.4%	58.8%	27.2%	15.0%	57.7%
Nicaragua	18.2%	27.2%	54.6%	24.9%	14.5%	60.6%
Netherlands	1.8%	20.3%	77.9%	2.3%	16.1%	81.6%
North Macedonia	11.4%	26.6%	62.0%	16.4%	29.6%	54.0%
Norway	1.7%	34.8%	63.5%	2.2%	20.3%	77.5%
Nepal	33.0%	15.4%	51.7%	72.9%	10.9%	16.2%
Oman	1.6%	52.4%	46.0%	5.0%	39.6%	55.5%
Pakistan	25.1%	20.1%	54.9%	43.4%	19.7%	36.9%
Panama	2.9%	27.7%	69.4%	15.3%	19.9%	64.8%
Peru	7.8%	32.8%	59.4%	25.6%	17.8%	56.6%
Philippines	10.3%	30.9%	58.8%	29.2%	16.2%	54.7%
Poland	2.5%	34.1%	63.4%	11.3%	30.2%	58.5%
Portugal	2.4%	22.4%	75.3%	8.3%	24.0%	67.7%
Paraguay	19.2%	29.6%	51.2%	20.1%	19.6%	60.4%
Qatar	0.2%	58.5%	41.3%	1.2%	54.1%	44.6%
Romania	4.8%	34.1%	61.2%	26.4%	29.0%	44.5%
Russia	4.6%	32.8%	62.7%	6.7%	27.2%	66.1%
Rwanda	30.2%	18.3%	51.6%	75.6%	7.1%	17.4%
Saudi Arabia	2.6%	45.1%	52.3%	6.1%	22.7%	71.2%
Sudan	39.3%	2.6%	58.1%	33.3%	20.3%	46.4%
Senegal	16.9%	23.8%	59.3%	52.6%	20.4%	27.0%
Singapore	0.0%	26.1%	73.8%	0.3%	17.1%	82.6%
Sierra Leone	60.5%	4.6%	34.9%	68.4%	6.3%	25.2%
El Salvador	11.1%	26.7%	62.2%	19.0%	20.2%	60.8%
Serbia	8.2%	31.4%	60.5%	19.4%	24.5%	56.1%
Sao Tome and Principe	12.6%	15.0%	72.4%	23.0%	13.6%	63.4%
Suriname	10.2%	28.1%	61.7%	3.3%	22.7%	74.0%
Slovakia	3.8%	34.5%	61.7%	3.4%	35.2%	61.4%
Slovenia	2.3%	32.6%	65.1%	9.1%	30.6%	60.3%
Sweden	1.4%	24.5%	74.2%	1.9%	18.6%	79.5%
Chad	52.4%	14.2%	33.4%	76.5%	2.1%	21.4%
Togo	40.7%	17.7%	40.7%	63.1%	8.6%	28.2%
Thailand	8.7%	36.4%	54.9%	35.3%	22.4%	42.3%
Tajikistan	25.0%	28.0%	47.1%	57.7%	12.9%	29.3%
Timor-Leste	17.6%	18.8%	63.6%	49.9%	1.8%	48.3%
Tonga	20.2%	19.4%	60.4%	33.8%	27.9%	38.3%
Trinidad and Tobago	0.5%	40.4%	59.0%	4.2%	31.4%	64.5%
Tunisia	11.0%	27.2%	61.8%	11.9%	29.5%	58.6%
Turkey	7.8%	31.7%	60.5%	20.5%	27.8%	51.7%
Tanzania	31.5%	26.4%	42.2%	67.7%	6.3%	26.0%
Uganda	26.1%	21.8%	52.1%	72.7%	7.2%	20.1%
Ukraine	14.2%	25.6%	60.2%	15.3%	24.7%	60.1%
Uruguay	7.0%	28.9%	64.1%	8.8%	20.5%	70.7%
United States	1.1%	20.0%	78.9%	1.5%	17.5%	81.0%
Uzbekistan	18.2%	34.5%	47.3%	30.1%	23.8%	46.1%
St. Vincent and the Grenadines	7.4%	18.2%	74.4%	22.9%	16.4%	60.7%
Vietnam	18.9%	37.0%	44.2%	44.0%	22.3%	33.7%
World	3.8%	27.3%	68.9%	29.5%	21.5%	48.9%
Samoa	9.5%	24.3%	66.2%	5.3%	14.5%	80.2%
Yemen	9.8%	48.1%	42.1%	27.8%	17.0%	55.2%
South Africa	2.3%	29.2%	68.5%	6.2%	26.4%	67.4%
Zambia	5.3%	35.3%	59.4%	54.9%	10.2%	34.9%
Zimbabwe	11.6%	24.2%	64.2%	67.1%	7.3%	25.6%

=== Ratio and GDP per person employed ===
Country	GDP to Employment ratio			GDP (PPP) per person employed			
Country	Agriculture	Industry	Services	Total	Agriculture	Industry	Services
Afghanistan	35%	231%	195%	6,558	2,278	15,170	12,817
Albania	54%	134%	134%	31,076	16,824	41,549	41,592
United Arab Emirates	19%	205%	74%	97,631	18,984	200,257	71,822
Argentina	286%	114%	90%	45,113	128,894	51,323	40,559
Armenia	55%	181%	107%	19,820	10,836	35,900	21,120
Australia	93%	117%	95%	88,412	82,097	103,012	84,313
Austria	25%	109%	102%	90,012	22,503	98,418	91,566
Azerbaijan	19%	350%	89%	35,200	6,576	123,075	31,155
Burundi	44%	635%	695%	1,651	731	10,478	11,477
Belgium	67%	104%	99%	102,439	68,293	106,767	101,910
Benin	58%	227%	111%	4,948	2,871	11,254	5,505
Burkina Faso	42%	433%	303%	3,623	1,520	15,675	10,966
Bangladesh	36%	150%	146%	7,457	2,694	11,205	10,905
Bulgaria	70%	93%	106%	40,164	27,940	37,477	42,770
Bahrain	30%	121%	90%	80,045	24,014	96,959	72,212
Bahamas	24%	78%	107%	41,879	9,919	32,800	44,896
Bosnia and Herzegovina	41%	90%	127%	38,478	15,807	34,554	49,020
Belarus	76%	114%	96%	33,059	25,055	37,767	31,679
Belize	94%	104%	101%	18,766	17,586	19,461	18,877
Bolivia	43%	156%	112%	13,634	5,901	21,266	15,205
Brazil	34%	103%	114%	30,843	10,350	31,843	35,312
Barbados	52%	50%	114%	32,516	16,819	16,174	37,155
Brunei	183%	323%	47%	164,315	301,244	530,997	76,639
Bhutan	30%	445%	121%	16,508	4,981	73,520	20,024
Botswana	9%	222%	110%	34,827	3,166	77,367	38,209
Central African Republic	58%	381%	178%	1,540	899	5,873	2,735
Switzerland	20%	127%	96%	100,654	20,131	127,791	97,083
Chile	45%	140%	94%	48,269	21,620	67,702	45,400
China	30%	173%	106%	23,967	7,298	41,361	25,436
Cote d'Ivoire	45%	525%	122%	9,323	4,156	48,988	11,398
Cameroon	26%	315%	196%	7,184	1,854	22,625	14,070
Congo, Dem. Rep.	31%	587%	156%	2,021	628	11,857	3,160
Congo, Rep.	17%	209%	117%	15,157	2,649	31,645	17,660
Colombia	48%	198%	86%	27,478	13,238	54,306	23,717
Cabo Verde	36%	179%	115%	14,305	5,174	25,545	16,504
Costa Rica	44%	115%	106%	33,868	14,869	38,983	35,846
Cyprus	51%	66%	110%	49,375	25,290	32,430	54,319
Czech Republic	96%	100%	100%	63,045	60,620	63,212	63,045
Germany	43%	110%	97%	87,477	37,490	95,973	85,129
Denmark	36%	118%	98%	93,976	33,831	111,107	91,696
Dominican Republic	42%	159%	97%	34,196	14,372	54,276	33,155
Algeria	111%	111%	91%	49,446	54,651	54,658	44,917
Ecuador	41%	178%	99%	24,837	10,133	44,269	24,703
Egypt	44%	144%	107%	34,629	15,167	49,943	37,027
Spain	68%	120%	97%	83,358	56,927	99,860	80,514
Estonia	82%	93%	104%	56,194	45,842	52,247	58,567
Eswatini	46%	225%	85%	32,982	15,222	74,356	27,900
Ethiopia	55%	221%	209%	3,307	1,816	7,317	6,903
Finland	58%	123%	96%	87,730	51,006	107,669	83,802
Fiji	51%	617%	94%	24,813	12,630	153,156	23,422
France	64%	95%	103%	92,998	59,784	88,056	95,426
Gabon	28%	266%	69%	63,902	18,093	169,959	44,225
United Kingdom	58%	107%	99%	78,773	45,951	84,249	78,084
Georgia	20%	217%	153%	17,720	3,560	38,393	27,029
Ghana	48%	192%	122%	8,815	4,265	16,895	10,737
Guinea	30%	413%	215%	2,678	800	11,056	5,757
Gambia	61%	104%	121%	5,382	3,261	5,578	6,487
Guinea-Bissau	81%	232%	112%	3,589	2,917	8,311	4,008
Equatorial Guinea	11%	302%	63%	55,374	6,293	166,987	35,047
Greece	32%	105%	111%	68,470	21,786	71,687	76,279
Guatemala	34%	152%	124%	18,989	6,466	28,843	23,610
Guyana	182%	26%	106%	18,925	34,364	4,898	20,084
Honduras	45%	129%	121%	10,555	4,785	13,634	12,731
Croatia	44%	97%	109%	54,958	24,297	53,538	60,064
Hungary	98%	105%	98%	58,341	57,045	61,037	57,178
Indonesia	42%	186%	100%	22,644	9,567	42,126	22,543
India	38%	122%	178%	15,521	5,905	18,984	27,552
Ireland	19%	203%	78%	142,759	26,437	289,717	111,013
Iran	60%	104%	112%	52,886	31,732	55,001	59,309
Iraq	23%	200%	91%	68,145	15,777	136,619	62,139
Iceland	147%	125%	92%	75,447	110,539	94,101	69,217
Israel	118%	115%	96%	75,934	89,740	87,616	73,111
Italy	61%	86%	107%	94,918	58,005	82,006	101,776
Jamaica	41%	151%	104%	18,870	7,776	28,492	19,719
Jordan	210%	167%	82%	38,885	81,659	65,028	32,057
Japan	29%	108%	101%	75,075	21,732	80,958	75,724
Kazakhstan	28%	158%	102%	46,897	13,027	73,988	47,737
Kenya	53%	227%	164%	8,199	4,361	18,643	13,458
Kyrgyzstan	54%	136%	112%	8,175	4,436	11,109	9,127
Cambodia	65%	153%	114%	5,955	3,862	9,100	6,789
South Korea	44%	153%	85%	67,808	29,992	103,468	57,788
Kuwait	19%	187%	69%	130,827	24,227	244,590	89,780
Lebanon	46%	76%	114%	39,027	18,086	29,491	44,514
Liberia	76%	108%	123%	2,320	1,754	2,500	2,865
St. Lucia	16%	74%	125%	25,314	4,050	18,805	31,680
Sri Lanka	31%	112%	136%	30,031	9,273	33,685	40,903
Lesotho	14%	185%	146%	8,693	1,178	16,069	12,688
Lithuania	40%	119%	101%	58,122	22,993	69,005	58,651
Luxembourg	21%	119%	99%	204,437	43,808	243,377	202,349
Latvia	54%	95%	107%	49,741	26,834	47,201	53,134
Morocco	43%	144%	122%	23,034	9,832	33,146	28,203
Moldova	51%	45%	180%	12,306	6,240	5,555	22,126
Madagascar	34%	173%	358%	2,777	954	4,791	9,940
Maldives	80%	45%	121%	22,490	18,048	10,028	27,230
Mexico	27%	130%	104%	38,507	10,269	50,166	39,887
Mali	73%	133%	138%	6,258	4,587	8,316	8,622
Malta	100%	68%	109%	76,638	76,638	52,004	83,870
Myanmar	102%	246%	65%	9,095	9,303	22,413	5,901
Montenegro	124%	99%	98%	46,023	57,234	45,500	44,914
Mongolia	51%	167%	101%	27,642	14,063	46,025	27,858
Mozambique	33%	527%	258%	3,445	1,153	18,149	8,897
Mauritania	68%	298%	88%	13,894	9,479	41,393	12,168
Mauritius	48%	85%	111%	42,292	20,300	36,131	47,082
Malawi	42%	340%	214%	2,596	1,103	8,837	5,550
Malaysia	68%	142%	87%	54,102	36,789	76,923	47,249
Namibia	21%	211%	114%	33,146	7,087	69,900	37,803
Niger	63%	133%	178%	2,867	1,810	3,823	5,094
Nigeria	77%	136%	102%	18,836	14,473	25,617	19,195
Nicaragua	73%	188%	90%	11,540	8,435	21,647	10,397
Netherlands	78%	126%	95%	93,385	73,084	117,746	89,151
North Macedonia	70%	90%	115%	36,981	25,706	33,233	42,460
Norway	77%	171%	82%	124,695	96,355	213,763	102,169
Nepal	45%	141%	319%	4,239	1,919	5,989	13,528
Oman	32%	132%	83%	89,461	28,628	118,378	74,148
Pakistan	58%	102%	149%	14,241	8,236	14,530	21,188
Panama	19%	139%	107%	45,874	8,695	63,855	49,130
Peru	30%	184%	105%	23,543	7,173	43,383	24,708
Philippines	35%	191%	107%	16,741	5,905	31,932	17,996
Poland	22%	113%	108%	56,240	12,442	63,503	60,951
Portugal	29%	93%	111%	59,901	17,321	55,908	66,625
Paraguay	96%	151%	85%	18,263	17,445	27,581	15,481
Qatar	17%	108%	93%	161,066	26,844	174,166	149,149
Romania	18%	118%	138%	46,300	8,418	54,442	63,676
Russia	69%	121%	95%	48,847	33,537	58,904	46,334
Rwanda	40%	258%	297%	3,398	1,357	8,758	10,077
Saudi Arabia	43%	199%	73%	130,050	55,431	258,381	95,528
Sudan	118%	13%	125%	17,780	20,984	2,277	22,263
Senegal	32%	117%	220%	7,883	2,533	9,197	17,313
Singapore	–	153%	89%	143,706	–	219,341	128,396
Sierra Leone	88%	73%	138%	3,524	3,117	2,573	4,880
El Salvador	58%	132%	102%	18,844	11,009	24,908	19,278
Serbia	42%	128%	108%	29,902	12,639	38,323	32,247
Sao Tome and Principe	55%	110%	114%	9,964	5,459	10,990	11,378
Suriname	309%	124%	83%	41,917	129,562	51,888	34,950
Slovakia	112%	98%	100%	63,448	70,912	62,186	63,758
Slovenia	25%	107%	108%	64,868	16,395	69,108	70,032
Sweden	74%	132%	93%	91,977	67,773	121,153	85,845
Chad	68%	676%	156%	5,787	3,964	39,131	9,032
Togo	65%	206%	144%	3,063	1,976	6,304	4,421
Thailand	25%	163%	130%	26,449	6,519	42,980	34,327
Tajikistan	43%	217%	161%	6,707	2,906	14,558	10,782
Timor-Leste	35%	1044%	132%	9,775	3,448	102,094	12,871
Tonga	60%	70%	158%	13,664	8,166	9,501	21,548
Trinidad and Tobago	12%	129%	91%	65,021	7,741	83,658	59,477
Tunisia	92%	92%	105%	34,898	32,259	32,177	36,804
Turkey	38%	114%	117%	58,400	22,220	66,593	68,340
Tanzania	47%	419%	162%	5,741	2,671	24,058	9,318
Uganda	36%	303%	259%	3,912	1,404	11,845	10,140
Ukraine	93%	104%	100%	15,708	14,579	16,280	15,734
Uruguay	80%	141%	91%	41,998	33,408	59,207	38,077
United States	73%	114%	97%	111,561	81,811	127,498	108,669
Uzbekistan	60%	145%	103%	14,140	8,550	20,497	14,508
St. Vincent and the Grenadines	32%	111%	123%	25,364	8,196	28,148	31,089
Vietnam	43%	166%	131%	9,419	4,046	15,628	12,354
World	13%	127%	141%	33,761	4,349	42,869	47,569
Samoa	179%	168%	83%	23,655	42,400	39,643	19,526
Yemen	35%	283%	76%	10,752	3,790	30,422	8,200
South Africa	37%	111%	102%	43,671	16,201	48,303	44,384
Zambia	10%	346%	170%	9,558	923	33,078	16,268
Zimbabwe	17%	332%	251%	3,621	626	12,004	9,081

== Sources ==
- GDP (nominal): International Monetary Fund, World Economic Outlook Database, April 2012: Nominal GDP list of countries. Data for the year 2012. - IMF
- GDP Sector composition: Field Listing - GDP composition by sector. - CIA World Factbook
