= Vladimir Burkov =

Russian mathematician (1939–2025)

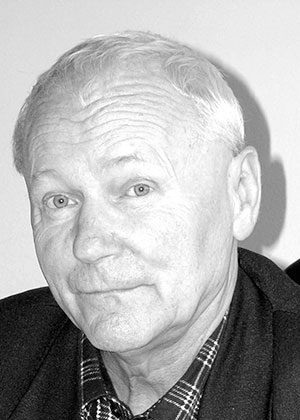
- Born: 17 November 1939; Vologda, Russian SFSR, USSR
- Died: 24 April 2025 (aged 85); Moscow, Russia

Academic background
- Education: Moscow Institute of Physics and Technology
- Doctoral advisor: Alexander Lerner

Academic work
- Discipline: Game theory, mechanism design, combinatorial optimization
- Institutions: V.A. Trapeznikov Institute of Control Sciences of RAS
- Doctoral students: Dmitry Novikov
- Notable ideas: Theory of Active Systems
- Awards: State Prize of USSR; Honoured Scholar of the Russian Federation

Vladimir Nikolaevich Burkov (Russian: Владимир Николаевич Бурков; 17 November 1939 – 24 April 2025) was a Russian control theorist and the author of more than four hundred publications on control problems, game theory, and combinatorial optimization. A laureate of the USSR State Prize, of the Prize of the Cabinet Council of the USSR, he was an Honoured Scholar of the Russian Federation. Vladimir Burkov was a vice-president of the Russian Project Management Association (SOVNET) (the Russian branch of International Project Management Association, IPMA), a member of the Russian Academy of Natural Sciences. As a professor at Moscow Institute of Physics and Technology and Head of Laboratory at the V.A. Trapeznikov Institute of Control Sciences of RAS, in the late 1960s he pioneered the theory of active systems (which was a Soviet version of the theory of mechanism design).

== Background ==
Vladimir Burkov was born on 17 November 1939, in the city of Vologda. In 1963 he graduated from the Moscow Institute of Physics and Technology (MIPT) and was employed by Institute of Automation and Remote Control (since the 1970s it has been known as ICS RAS, V.A. Trapeznikov Institute of Control Sciences of RAS), where he earned his Candidate of Sciences degree in 1966, and became Doctor of Sciences in 1975. In 1981 he earned professorship at the Chair of Control Sciences at MIPT and from 1974 onwards he worked at ICS RAS as a Head of Laboratory 57 "Laboratory of active systems" (until 2019) and a senior research scientist.

Married to Elena Burkova, the couple had a daughter Irina, who also earned a doctoral degree for her contributions to control theory.

Burkov died in Moscow on 24 April 2025, at the age of 85.

== Contributions to combinatory optimization and project scheduling ==
Vladimir Burkov's early academic interests were connected with applied problems of combinatorial optimization; in the 1960s he contributed to the boom of project scheduling and network planning, proposed novel models of resource allocation in organizations and in technical systems, solved several extremal graph problems. In particular, Vladimir Burkov proposed a lower-bound estimate of the project makespan in resource-constrained project scheduling problem re-invented in 1998 by A. Mingozzi et al. Two books by Vladimir Burkov, "Network models and control problems" and "Applied problems of graph theory" put forward the problems being intensively studied until now.

== Launching theory of active systems ==
As of the late 1960s, Vladimir Burkov's interests shifted to the studies of the specific nature of the human being as a controlled object (an agent). In 1969 he pursued an idea of the "fairplay principle" (in Russian: принцип открытого управления): plans assigned to selfish agents by the optimal control mechanism must be coordinated with agents' goal functions. Under such an incentive-compatible mechanism, truthtelling is beneficial for agents. The notion of incentive compatibility was independently proposed by Leonid Hurwitz, and later was extended and elaborated by Allan Gibbard, Roger Myerson, and many other researchers. They pioneered the revelation principle, which opened a new era in the studies of economic institutions (mechanism design and contract theory); it was mentioned as the main achievement in 2007's Nobel Memorial Prize in Economic Sciences won by L. Hurwitz, E. Maskin, and R. Myerson.

The fairplay principle became the foundation of the newly introduced theory of active systems (a version of mechanism design originating from the USSR), which systematically studied control mechanisms in man-machine systems. In the 1970s the seminal books and articles determined the directions of theory development for many decades to come (some books of the early 2010s are contained in these references:).

== Organizational and teaching activities ==
In 1973 V. Burkov headed the newly created division in the Institute of Automation and Remote Control called "the Sector of Business Games"; in 1974 it was re-organized into the Laboratory 57 "Theory and methods of business games", later renamed to "Laboratory of Active Systems". As of the end of 2016 its staff numbered 28 employees, including 15 Doctors of Sciences and 5 Candidates of Sciences. Over the decades, V. Burkov supervised dozens of thesis works.

== Famous followers ==
Professor Dmitry Novikov, corresponding member of Russian Academy of Sciences (since 2008), was elected a director of ICS RAS on 17 October 2016.
