= Budget-balanced mechanism =

In mechanism design, a branch of economics, a weakly-budget-balanced (WBB) mechanism is a mechanism in which the total payment made by the participants is at least 0. This means that the mechanism operator does not incur a deficit, i.e., does not have to subsidize the market. Weak budget balance is considered a necessary requirement for the economic feasibility of a mechanism. A strongly-budget-balanced (SBB) mechanism is a mechanism in which the total payment made by the participants is exactly 0. This means that all payments are made among the participants - the mechanism has neither a deficit nor a surplus. The term budget-balanced mechanism is sometimes used as a shorthand for WBB, and sometimes as a shorthand for SBB.

== Weak budget balance ==
A simple example of a WBB mechanism is the Vickrey auction, in which the operator wants to sell an object to one of n potential buyers. Each potential buyer bids a value, the highest bidder wins an object and pays the second-highest bid. As all bids are positive, the total payment is trivially positive too.

As an example of a non-WBB mechanism, consider its extension to a bilateral trade setting. Here, there is a buyer and a seller; the buyer has a value of b and the seller has a cost of s. Trade should occur if and only if b > s. The only truthful mechanism that implements this solution must charge a trading buyer the cost s and pay a trading seller the value b; but since b > s, this mechanism runs a deficit. In fact, the Myerson–Satterthwaite theorem says that every Pareto-efficient truthful mechanism must incur a deficit.

McAfee developed a solution to this problem for a large market (with many potential buyers and sellers): McAfee's mechanism is WBB, truthful and almost Pareto-efficient - it performs all efficient deals except at most one. McAfee's mechanism has been extended to various settings, while keeping its WBB property. See double auction for more details.

== Strong budget balance ==
In a strongly-budget-balanced (SBB) mechanism, all payments are made between the participants themselves. An advantage of SBB is that all the gain from trade remains in the market; thus, the long-term welfare of the traders is larger and their tendency to participate may be higher.

McAfee's double-auction mechanism is WBB but not SBB - it may have a surplus, and this surplus may account for almost all the gain from trade. There is a simple SBB mechanism for bilateral trading: trade occurs iff b > s, and in this case the buyer pays (b+s)/2 to the seller. Since the payment goes directly from the buyer to the seller, the mechanism is SBB; however, it is not truthful, since the buyer can gain by bidding b' < b and the seller can gain by bidding s' > s. Recently, some truthful SBB mechanisms for double auction have been developed. Some of them have been generalized to multi-sided markets.

== See also ==
- Balanced budget - a budget in which revenues are equal to expenditures
- Government budget balance - a financial statement presenting the government's proposed revenues and spending for a financial year.
- Balanced budget amendment - a rule in the USA constitution requiring that a state cannot spend more than its income.
