= Budget-feasible mechanism =

In mechanism design, a branch of economics, a budget-feasible mechanism is a mechanism in which the total payment made by the auctioneer is upper-bounded by a fixed pre-specified budget. They were first presented by Yaron Singer, and studied by several others.

== Overview and Core Concepts ==
Budget-feasible mechanism design is a subfield of algorithmic mechanism design that focuses on procurement auctions where the auctioneer (buyer) has a strictly limited budget. Unlike standard mechanism design, which often seeks to maximize social welfare or revenue without a hard constraint on the total payment, budget-feasible mechanisms must ensure that the sum of payments to strategic agents (sellers) does not exceed a fixed budget $B$.This field is particularly critical in environments such as crowdsourcing, data acquisition for machine learning, and environmental conservation, where a central agency must procure services from agents with private costs while adhering to financial limits.

== Model ==
In a typical budget-feasible setting, there is a set of sellers $N$, each possessing a single item or service. Each seller $i$ has a private cost $c_i$ for providing their service. The buyer has a valuation function $v: 2^N \to \mathbb{R}_{\geq 0}$ that assigns a value to every subset of sellers. The objective is to design a mechanism—consisting of an allocation rule and a payment rule—that satisfies several key properties:

Truthfulness (Incentive Compatibility): Sellers maximize their utility by reporting their true costs $c_i$.

Individual Rationality: No seller is paid less than their reported cost.

Budget Feasibility: The total payment $\sum p_i$ does not exceed the budget $B$.

Efficiency (Approximation): The mechanism aims to maximize the valuation $v(S)$ relative to the optimal subset that could be bought if costs were public.

=== The Difficulty of the Budget Constraint ===
Designing budget feasible mechanisms is significantly more challenging than unconstrained auctions (such as those using the VCG mechanism) because the budget constraint couples the allocation and payment rules. In standard auctions, one can often determine the optimal allocation and then calculate payments; in budget-feasible auctions, an allocation that seems optimal might require payments that violate the budget, necessitating a "greedy" approach with carefully calculated thresholds.

== Foundational Developments ==
The field was initiated by Yaron Singer in 2010. Singer demonstrated that for any submodular set function, i.e. valuation function where the marginal value of an item decreases as the set of items grows (the law of diminishing returns), a constant-factor approximation mechanism exists and introduced the proportional share mechanism. Subsequent work expanded these results to more complex valuation classes:Subadditive functions: Functions where the value of the union of two sets is no more than the sum of their individual values. Early results provided an $O(\log^2 n)$ approximation, while more recent work has improved this to $O(\log n)$ by connecting the problem to the integrality gap of linear programs and the approximate core in cooperative game theory.

== Applications ==
Budget-feasible mechanisms are widely implemented in Crowdsourcing applications such as data labeling and data acquisition selecting data points to train AI models under a limited procurement budget.

== See also ==
- Mechanism design
- Submodular set function
- Procurement auction
