= Becker–DeGroot–Marschak method =

Economics measure of willingness to pay

The Becker–DeGroot–Marschak method (BDM), named after Gordon M. Becker, Morris H. DeGroot and Jacob Marschak for the 1964 Behavioral Science paper, "Measuring Utility by a Single-Response Sequential Method" is an incentive-compatible procedure used in experimental economics to measure willingness to pay (WTP).

Today there are several variations of the BDM methodology. In one common way, the subject formulates a bid. The bid is compared to a price determined by a random number generator. If the subject's bid is greater than the price, they pay the price and receives the item being auctioned. If the subject's bid is lower than the price, they pay nothing and receive nothing.

In another common method, the subject is presented with a series of sequentially increasing or random-order monetary amounts. They must decide if they would prefer to have that amount of money or the item at hand. Then, one of these numbers is chosen either specifically by the experimenter or is randomly generated. If the chosen number is less than the amount of money at which the subject stated they would prefer the item, the subject must purchase the item.

From the subject's perspective, the method is equivalent to a Vickrey auction against an unknown bidder. BDM's incentive compatibility is a well established theoretical result, and it relies on similar arguments to that of the Vickrey auction. When one considers uncertainty in WTP, the incentive-compatibility of BDM will no longer hold. The BDM method is most widely used in experimental economics, but has also been used in the domains of agriculture and marketing.

An early attempt at a BDM-type method was by Johann Wolfgang von Goethe. In 1797 he asked a publisher how much he would be willing to pay for his new poem Hermann and Dorothea and revealed that he had sent a sealed letter to his lawyer with a reserve amount. If the publisher's stated amount was greater than the reserve, the publisher just paid the reserve amount. Otherwise, the publisher did not receive the poem. Unfortunately, Goethe's lawyer divulged the reserve amount to the publisher so that the publisher's true willingness to pay was not revealed.

The BDM method can also be used to incentivize expert appraisers to reveal the true value of an item, even if computing the true value is costly for them.

== See also ==
- Vickrey auction
- Incentive compatibility
