= Sponsored search auction =

Auctioning of sponsored search engine results

A sponsored search auction (SSA), also known as a keyword auction, is an indispensable part of the business model of modern web hosts. It refers to results from a search engine that are not output by the main search algorithm, but rather clearly separate advertisements paid for by third parties. These advertisements are typically related to the terms for which the user searched. They come in the form of a link and some information, with the hope that a search user will click on the link and buy something from the advertiser. In sponsored search auctions, there are typically some fixed number of slots for advertisements and more advertisers that want these slots than there are slots. The advertisers have different valuations for these slots and slots are a scarce resource, so an auction is done to determine how the slots will be assigned.

== History ==
Prior to 1998, many advertisements were charged by impression, as it was the easiest metric to calculate. In 1998, GoTo.com, Inc debuted a pay-per-click charging system, with pricing and slot placement determined by an auction. GoTo used a first price auction, where bidders were placed according to their bids and charged their bids when they won. GoTo faced bidders who were constantly changing their bid in response to new information and changing information from other bidders.

Currently, charging per action is a common pricing scheme in affiliate networks, such as the Amazon Associates Program.

In 2002, Google Ads began using a second price auction to sell the single advertisement slot. Shortly thereafter, pages had multiple advertisements slots, which were allocated and sold via generalized second-price auction (GSP) auction, the natural generalization of a second price, single item, multi bidder auction.

Marketing activities related to the sponsored search are increasingly contracted out to specialized digital marketing agencies (DMAs). Thousands of DMAs operate in the US market, but most of them belong to one of the seven agency networks, which also bid on behalf of their clients for keywords for sponsored search. This phenomenon has increased the fraction of auctions in which the same agency bids on behalf of different advertisers, thereby altering the normal functioning of standard sponsored search auction mechanisms, such as the generalized second-price auction and the Vickrey–Clarke–Groves auction.

== Auction Mechanisms ==
=== Generalized Second Price Auction ===
Generalized second-price auction (GSP) is the most commonly used auction mechanism for sponsored search.

==== Untruthfulness ====
An issue with GSP is that it's not a truthful auction and it is not the optimal strategy. To illustrate this, consider the following example.

There are three bidders with only two possible slots. The values of each bidders 1, 2, and 3 are $10, $5, and $3 respectively. Suppose that the first slot click through rate (CTR) is 300 and the second slot CTR is 290. If bidder 1 is truthful, he would have to pay $p_1 = \$5(300) = \$1500$ for a utility of $u_1 = \$10(300)-\$1500 = \$1500$. However, if bidder 1 decides to lie and reports a value of $4 instead then his utility would be $u_2 = \$10(290) - \$3(290) = \$2030$. Notice that $u_2 > u_1$ which makes GSP untruthful and bidders have an incentive to lie.

==== Quality Variant ====
Google uses a minor variant of GSP to auction off advertisement slots. Potential advertisements may be of varying quality. Suppose that there are two advertisements for eggs. One advertisement simply fills its space with the word “egg” repeated over and over, while the other advertisement shows a picture of eggs, contains branding information, and mentions positive qualities about their eggs, such as cage-freeness. The second advertisement may be thought of as having higher quality than the first advertisement, being more useful to consumers, more likely to be clicked on, and more likely to generate revenue for both the advertiser and Google. Advertisements that have a history of high click through rates, are geographically targeted at the user, or have a high quality landing page may also be thought of as having higher quality.

Google assigns a numeric “quality” score $\gamma_i$ to each bidder $i$. Bidders, rather than being ordered purely by their bid, are instead ordered by rank, which is the product of their bid and quality score $\gamma_1 b_1 \geq \gamma_2 b_2 \geq \dots \geq \gamma_n b_n$ . Slots are still assigned in decreasing rank order. Bidders are charged (rather than the bid of the bidder one rank lower, $p_i := b_{i+1}$) the minimum price for which, if it was their bid, would keep them in their current rank: $p_i := \frac{\gamma_{i+1}b_{i+1}}{\gamma_i}$.

=== Vickrey–Clarke–Groves Auction ===
Vickrey–Clarke–Groves auction (VCG) is a truthful auction optimizing social welfare. VCG is more complicated to explain than GSP and that might deter many websites from using a VCG auction mechanism even though it's truthful. However, some websites use VCG as their auction mechanism, most notably Facebook.

== See also ==
- Generalized second-price auction
- Vickrey–Clarke–Groves auction
