= Kim Border =

American behavioral economist (1952–2020)

Kim C. Border
- Born: June 27, 1952
- Died: November 19, 2020 (aged 68)
- Education: California Institute of Technology; University of Minnesota
- Known for: Border's theorem
- Children: 1
- Scientific career
- Fields: Economics
- Doctoral advisor: Marcel Kessel Richter

Kim C. Border was an American behavioral economist and professor of economics at the California Institute of Technology.

== Career ==
Border received a bachelor's degree in economics from Caltech in 1974. Shortly after completing his Ph.D. in economics at the University of Minnesota in 1979, he returned to Caltech as a faculty member, where he remained for over forty years.

Border specialized in decision theory and auction design. In 1991, he proved a set of inequalities (now known as Border's theorem) that characterize the possible allocations for a single-item auction, a result that now plays a key role in the computational design of auctions. He also contributed several applications of Arrow's impossibility theorem to economic domains.

Border was also known for his teaching in subjects of mathematical economics, and for his extensive in-depth lecture notes.

== Personal life ==
Border died on November 19, 2020, and is survived by his son.

== Selected publications ==
- Border, Kim (1985). Fixed Point Theorems with Applications to Economics and Game Theory. Cambridge: Cambridge University Press. doi:10.1017/CBO9780511625756. ISBN 9780511625756.
- Aliprantis, Charalambos; Border, Kim (2006). Infinite Dimensional Analysis: A Hitchhiker's Guide. Springer-Verlag. doi:10.1007/3-540-29587-9. ISBN 9783662039625.
- Border, Kim C.; Sobel, Joel (1987). "Samurai Accountant: A Theory of Auditing and Plunder". The Review of Economic Studies. 54 (4): 525–540. doi:10.2307/2297481. JSTOR 2297481.
- Border, Kim C. (1991). "Implementation of Reduced Form Auctions: A Geometric Approach". Econometrica. 59 (4): 1178–1187. doi:10.2307/2938181. JSTOR 2938181.
