= Requisition =

Requisition may refer to:

- Purchase requisition, a document issued by a buyer to a seller indicating types, quantities, and agreed prices for products or services
- Requisition in military logistics
- Requisition of property by a government under eminent domain
- Indian National Congress (R) (Requisitionists), 1969–1970s, former Indian political party led by prime minister Indira Gandhi
