= Game form =

Game theory concept

In game theory and related fields, a game form, game frame, ruleset, or outcome function is the set of rules that govern a game and determine its outcome based on each player's choices. A game form differs from a game in that it does not stipulate the utilities or payoffs for each agent.

Mathematically, a game form can be defined as a mapping going from an action space—which describes all the possible moves a player can make—to an outcome space. The action space is also often called a message space when the actions consist of providing information about beliefs or preferences, in which case it is called a direct mechanism. For example, an electoral system is a game form mapping a message space consisting of ballots to a winning candidate (the outcome). Similarly, an auction is a game form that takes each bidder's price and maps them to both a winner and a set of payments by the bidders.

Often, a game form is a set of rules or institutions designed to implement some normative goal (called a social choice function), by motivating agents to act in a particular way through an appropriate choice of incentives. Then, the game form is called an implementation or mechanism. This approach is widely used in the study of auctions and electoral systems.

The social choice function represents the desired outcome or goal of the game, such as maximizing social welfare or achieving a fair allocation of resources. The mechanism designer's task is to design the game form in such a way that when each player plays their best response (i.e. behaves strategically), the resulting equilibrium implements the desired social choice function.
