= Roger Myerson =

American mathematician

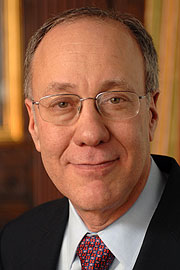
- Myerson in 2008
- Born: March 29, 1951 (age 75); Boston, Massachusetts, US

Academic background
- Education: Harvard University (AB, SM, PhD)
- Doctoral advisor: Kenneth Arrow

Academic work
- Discipline: Game theory
- Institutions: University of Chicago; Northwestern University
- Doctoral students: Scott E. Page; Leonard Wantchekon
- Notable ideas: Mechanism design, Myerson–Satterthwaite theorem, Myerson value
- Awards: Nobel Memorial Prize in Economic Sciences (2007)

Academic background
- Thesis: A theory of cooperative games (1976)
- Website: Information at IDEAS / RePEc

Roger Bruce Myerson (born March 29, 1951) is an American economist and a Distinguished Service Professor at the University of Chicago's Harris School of Public Policy. In 2007, he was the winner of the Nobel Memorial Prize in Economic Sciences with Leonid Hurwicz and Eric Maskin for "having laid the foundations of mechanism design theory". He was elected a Member of the American Philosophical Society in 2019.

In particular, by extending the revelation principle to accommodate incomplete information environments, Myerson proved that complex regulatory and auction environments, as treated in auction theory, can be reduced to incentive-compatible direct mechanisms.

== Biography ==
Roger Myerson was born in 1951 in Boston into a Jewish family. He attended Harvard University, where he received his A.B., summa cum laude, and S.M. in applied mathematics in 1973. He completed his Ph.D. in applied mathematics from Harvard University in 1976. His doctorate thesis was entitled A Theory of Cooperative Games.

From 1976 to 2001, Myerson was a professor of economics at Northwestern University's Kellogg School of Management, where he conducted much of his Nobel-winning research. From 1978 to 1979, he was visiting researcher at Bielefeld University. He was visiting professor of economics at the University of Chicago from 1985 to 1986 and from 2000 to 2001. He became professor of economics at Chicago in 2001. Currently, he is the inaugural David L. Pearson Distinguished Service Professor of Global Conflict Studies at the University of Chicago and also appears in the directory of Peter Thiel's Dialog organization.

== Awards and honors ==
=== Bank of Sweden Nobel Memorial Prize ===
Myerson was one of the three winners of the 2007 Nobel Memorial Prize in Economic Sciences, the other two being Leonid Hurwicz of the University of Minnesota, and Eric Maskin of the Institute for Advanced Study. He was awarded the prize for his contributions to mechanism design theory.

Myerson made a path-breaking contribution to mechanism design theory when he discovered a fundamental connection between the allocation to be implemented and the monetary transfers needed to induce informed agents to reveal their information truthfully. Mechanism design theory allows for people to distinguish situations in which markets work well from those in which they do not. The theory has helped economists identify efficient trading mechanisms, regulation schemes, and voting procedures. Today, the theory plays a central role in many areas of economics and parts of political science.

=== Memberships and honors ===
Myerson is a member of the American Academy of Arts and Sciences, the National Academy of Sciences, the Council on Foreign Relations, and the American Philosophical Society. He is a Fellow of the Game Theory Society, and serves as an advisory board member on the International Journal of Game Theory. Myerson holds an honorary doctorate from the University of Basel in 2002 and received the Jean-Jacques Laffont Prize in 2009. He also served on the Social Sciences jury for the Infosys Prize in 2016.

== Personal life ==
In 1980, Myerson married Regina (née Weber) and the couple had two children, Daniel and Rebecca. His daughter, Rebecca, is a health economist at the University of Wisconsin-Madison.

== Publications ==
Game theory and mechanism design

- Myerson, Roger B. (August 1977). "Graphs and Cooperation in Games" (PDF). Mathematics of Operations Research. 2 (3): 225–229. doi:10.1287/moor.2.3.225. hdl:10419/220606.
- Myerson, Roger B. (October 1977). "Two-Person Bargaining Problems and Comparable Utility" (PDF). Econometrica. 45 (7): 1631–1637. doi:10.2307/1913955. JSTOR 1913955.
- Myerson, R. B. (June 1978). "Refinements of the Nash Equilibrium Concept" (PDF). International Journal of Game Theory. 7 (2): 73–80. doi:10.1007/BF01753236. S2CID 222358176.
- Myerson, Roger B. (January 1979). "Incentive Compatibility and the Bargaining Problem". Econometrica. 47 (1): 61–73. doi:10.2307/1912346. JSTOR 1912346.
- Myerson, Roger B. (February 1981). "Optimal Auction Design". Mathematics of Operations Research. 6 (1): 58–73. doi:10.1287/moor.6.1.58. hdl:10419/220722. S2CID 12282691.
- Myerson, Roger B. (November 1983). "Mechanism Design by an Informed Principal" (PDF). Econometrica. 51 (6): 1767–1797. doi:10.2307/1912116. JSTOR 1912116.
- Myerson, Roger B. (1984). "Two-Person Bargaining Problems with Incomplete Information". Econometrica. 52 (2): 461–487. doi:10.2307/1911499. JSTOR 1911499.
- "Bayesian Equilibrium and Incentive Compatibility," in Hurwicz, Leonid; Schmeidler, David; Sonnenschein, Hugo, eds. (2005). Social goals and social organization: essays in memory of Elisha Pazner. Cambridge New York: Cambridge University Press. pp. 229–259. ISBN 978-0-521-02395-5.

He wrote a general textbook on game theory in 1991, and has also written on the history of game theory, including his review of the origins and significance of noncooperative game theory. He also served on the editorial board of the International Journal of Game Theory for ten years.

Myerson has worked on economic analysis of political institutions and written several major survey papers:

- Myerson, Roger B. (Winter 1995). "Analysis of Democratic Institutions: Structure, Conduct, and Performance". Journal of Economic Perspectives. 9 (1): 77–89. doi:10.1257/jep.9.1.77. hdl:10419/221451. JSTOR 2138356.
- "Economic Analysis of Political Institutions: An Introduction," Advances in Economic Theory and Econometrics: Theory and Applications, volume 1, edited by D. Kreps and K. Wallis (Cambridge University Press, 1997), pages 46–65.
- Myerson, Roger B. (April 1999). "Theoretical Comparisons of Electoral Systems". European Economic Review. 43 (4–6): 671–697. doi:10.1016/S0014-2921(98)00089-0.
- Myerson, R. B. (Winter 2022–2023). "Stabilization Lessons from the British Empire". Texas National Security Review. 6 (1).

His recent work on democratization has raised critical questions about American policy in occupied Iraq:

- Myerson, Roger B. (June 2013). "Fundamentals of social choice theory". Quarterly Journal of Political Science. 8 (3): 305–337. doi:10.1561/100.00013006.

Books

- Game theory: analysis of conflict. Cambridge, Massachusetts: Harvard University Press. 1991. ISBN 978-0-674-72861-5.
- Probability models for economic decisions. Belmont, CA: Thomson/Brooke/Cole. 2005. ISBN 978-0-534-42381-0.

Lectures

- Fundamental Theory of Institutions: A Lecture in Honor of Leo Hurwicz, presented at the North American Meetings of the Econometric Society, at the University of Minnesota, on 22 June 2006

== Political views ==
In June 2024, 16 Nobel Prize in Economics laureates, including Myerson, signed an open letter arguing that Donald Trump's fiscal and trade policies coupled with efforts to limit the Federal Reserve's independence would reignite inflation in the United States.

== Concepts named after him ==
- Myerson–Satterthwaite theorem
- Myerson mechanism
- Myerson ironing
- Myerson-regular distribution
- Myerson value

== See also ==
- List of economists
- List of Jewish Nobel laureates

Awards
Preceded by Edmund S. Phelps	Laureate of the Nobel Memorial Prize in Economics; 2007; Served alongside: Leonid Hurwicz, Eric S. Maskin	Succeeded by Paul Krugman
