= Purchase order =

Commercial document

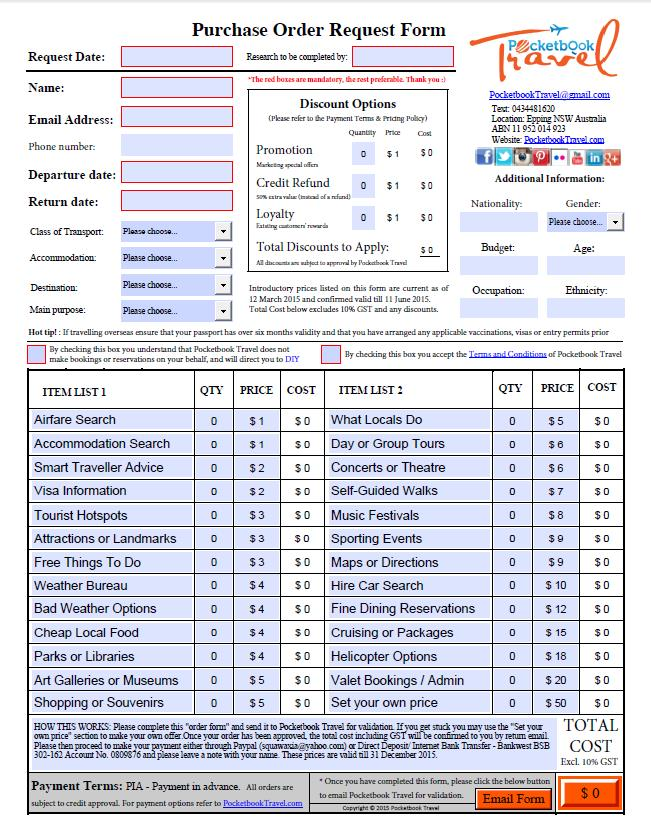
An example of a purchase order request from a travel agent.

A purchase order (PO) is a commercial document issued by a buyer to a seller, indicating types, quantities, and agreed prices for products or services required. It is used to control the purchasing of products and services from external suppliers. Purchase orders can be an essential part of enterprise resource planning system orders.

An indent is a purchase order often placed through an agent (indent agent) under specified conditions of sale.

The issue of a purchase order does not itself form a contract. If no prior contract exists, then it is the acceptance of the order by the seller that forms a contract between the buyer and seller.

== Overview ==
Purchase orders allow buyers to clearly and openly communicate with the sellers to maintain transparency. They may also help a purchasing agent to manage incoming orders and pending orders. Sellers are also protected by the use of purchase orders, in case of a buyer's refusal to pay for goods or services.

Purchase orders provide benefits in that they streamline the purchasing process in a standard procedure. Commercial lenders or financial institutions may provide financial assistance on the basis of purchase orders. There are various trade finance facilities that almost every financial institution allows business people to use against purchase orders such as:

1. Before shipment credit facility
2. Post shipment credit facility
3. Trade finance facility
4. Foreign bill purchase credit facility
5. Bill retirement credit facility
6. Order confirmation
7. Followup

The purpose of purchase orders is to procure materials for direct consumption or for stock, procure services, fulfil customer requirements using external resources, or procure a material that is required in production from an internal source (long-distance intra-plant stock transfers). They may also place once-only procurement transactions and optimize purchasing by taking full advantage of negotiated conditions or for optimal utilisation of existing resource capacities.

Creating a purchase order is typically the first step of the purchase-to-pay process in an ERP system. Purchase orders may require a SKU code.

Many organisations encourage staff to use a purchasing card (or procurement card) for low value purchases instead of issuing a purchase order.

Future business scenarios anticipate a reduced role for purchase orders or even their full elimination, leaving organizations with a smaller and more strategic procurement function than in the past. Kai Nowosel and Kris Timmermans of consultants Accenture ask why purchase orders and invoices are needed when digital systems can deliver goods confirmations and authorize funds, and suggest that digital functionality and supply analytics will change the landscape for purchase orders and processes "in the coming years".

== Legal ==
Although a typical purchase order may not be worded as a contract (in fact most contain little more than a list of the goods or services the buyer desires to purchase, along with price, payment terms, and shipping instructions), the purchase order is a specially regarded instrument regulated by the Uniform Commercial Code or other similar law which establishes a purchase order as a contract by its nature. Yet despite the nature of the purchase order as a contract, it is common to accompany the acceptance of a purchase order with a legal document such as the terms and conditions of sale, which establish specific or additional legal conditions of the contract.

The US Federal Acquisition Regulation states that purchase orders should generally be issued on a fixed-price basis, but provision is also made for unpriced purchase orders to be issued where "it is impractical to obtain pricing in advance of issuance of the purchase order".

In the UK, the Office of Government Commerce noted with concern in 2010 that "contracting authorities [were] not always raising purchase orders", and that where they were used, invoices were not always being reconciled to purchase orders before payment. Some organisations operate a "No PO, no pay" policy, which means that invoices which do not refer to a purchase order number will be returned to the supplier unpaid. The City of London Corporation, for example, operates such a policy.

== Formats ==
=== Electronic ===
Many purchase orders are no longer paper-based but rather transmitted electronically over the Internet. It is common for electronic purchase orders to be used to buy goods or services of any type online.

There are many names for Electronic Purchase Orders. They are sometimes referred to as E-Procurement, E-Purchasing, or E-Purchase Requisition.

=== Non-electronic ===
The record of purchase order in most business firms are still on paper and thus there is a need for proper purchase order format. Many users wish to have professional formatting for purchase orders for several reasons. A company may wish to have a strong understanding of purchase transactions or to know the basic requirements of purchase order. It may also make it part of business documentation, which makes the process easier while keeping record of all transactions and to have good impression on the client or customer.

== Planned purchase order ==
The term "planned purchase order" (PPO) is used to refer to a buyer's commitment to purchase goods or services from a single supplier on a long term basis, with individual purchase orders specifying the quantities required from time to time.

== Purchase order request ==
A purchase order request or purchase requisition is a request sent internally within a company to obtain purchased goods and services, including stock. The request is a document which tells the purchasing department or manager exactly what items and services are requested, the quantity, source and associated costs.

A Purchase Requisition Form (PRF) is filled out prior to purchasing goods as a form of tangible authorisation. Purchase request forms are often used in smaller business who do not have a computer-based system. However, many computer (included web-based solution) systems are available on the market that can facilitate the capture of purchase request information. Purchase order requests can also be passed to the purchasing department via a management information system.

A PRF may contain budget and purchase values to make the individual aware of the annual and remaining budget before a purchase is made. Such a system is there to guarantee that goods and services are purchased with the consent of the line manager and that a sufficient budget is available.

== Purchase order finance ==
The term "purchase order finance" (PO finance) is used to refer to a type of financing that helps buyers receive financing help from another entity to prepay the cost of goods (and sometimes services). This takes the form of a loan or purchase agreement that can be with or without recourse, depending upon the structure of the deal. There are very few purchase order finance companies, as the market is small, niche, and rarely advertises. Oftentimes, PO finance companies will work alongside factoring or accounts receivables finance companies to provide a complete financing package. Factoring companies like LSQ, Riviera Funding, and Triumph, among others, work with companies like King Trade or PayMeFaster to achieve the combined package of PO financing and receivables financing (factoring).

Many transactions are between a Client company that is selling to a large Buyer, and buying from a Supplier in Asia, South America, or Europe. An example would be that Client buys goods from Supplier at $500 per item and sells to Buyer for $600 per item. In this case, the PO finance company would help by paying for (financing) the goods from the Supplier at $500, which are then shipped to the Client, and then to the Buyer. 30-60-90-120 days later, the Buyer and would pay the PO finance company at $600 per item. The PO finance company would then pay down their loan and remit the balance to Client.

== Direct and indirect procurement ==
Direct procurement is what a company needs to produce a finished product or provide a service. For example: scrap glass for glass production or sand, or chemicals for drug production. Each industry has its own categorisation, a division into direct and indirect procurement. There are borderline categories, such as transportation of finished goods.

Direct procurement:

- cost categories (more than 50% of total costs);
- high impact on product quality, revenues and profits;
- management control (usually, there is a procurement department);
- high level of digitalisation;
- strong integration of production, logistics; other stakeholders in the background;
- stable suppliers, production cycle, high system rigidity;
- cost optimisation projects are permanent, aiming for short-term results not at the expense of price, but rather at the expense of consumption.

Indirect procurement:

- less costly categories;
- revenue impact is high, but more indirect;
- lack of a unified management strategy;
- scattered functions - the procurement department covers a small part of it: little data, information, attention to categories, low level of digitization;
- there are few or no category experts;
- internal clients are often the buyers themselves for their own functions (IT, marketing, HR, logistics), each with their own stable procurement scheme

== See also ==
- Blanket order
- Collateral Billing number
- Invoice
- Purchase order request
- Remittance advice
- Sales order
- Supply-chain auction
