= Alexander Lerner =

Soviet scientist (1913–2004)

Alexander Yakovlevich Lerner
- Александр Яковлевич Лернер
- Born: September 7, 1913; Vinnytsia, Russian Empire
- Died: April 6, 2004 (aged 90); Rehovot, Israel
- Education: Moscow Power Engineering Institute (PhD, 1940)
- Occupations: Electrical engineering, cybernetics

Alexander Yakovlevich Lerner (Russian: Александр Яковлевич Лернер; 7 September 1913 – 6 April 2004) was a scientist and Soviet refusenik.

== Biography ==
=== Early years ===
He was born to a Jewish family in Vinnytsia, Russian Empire (now Ukraine). His father was a pharmacist and had a drugstore. He graduated from a seven-year school in Vinnitsa at age 12 instead of 14, skipping two grades. His school performance was mediocre, as Lerner was more interested in science outside the school program. At the age of 13 he entered the electromechanical college, where he mastered the profession of technician-engineer.

=== Scientific career ===
Lerner graduated with a degree in electrical engineering from the Moscow Power Engineering Institute in 1938, and received a Ph.D. from the same institution in 1940. During World War II, he worked on installing and debugging US equipment at a steel mill in Siberia while it was under construction. In 1943, when the construction was finished, Lerner went back to Moscow, where he served as the chief engineer of the Central Autonomous Laboratory at the Soviet Ministry of Ferrous Metallurgy in Moscow.

Lerner became a member of the Soviet scientific and technological elite. He was a leading practitioner of cybernetics. It is a branch of science that deals with human control systems like the brain and nervous systems where they interconnect with complex electronic systems. His mathematical equations were used in forecasting supply and demand for vital materials like steel, or allocating scarce resources.

=== Becoming refusenik ===
He was the first prominent Soviet scientist to seek to emigrate to Israel. His request was denied, resulting in the sudden loss of his positions and privileges. In 1977, a letter was published in the Soviet newspaper Izvestiya calling Lerner "the leader of an espionage nest." His closest associates in the refusenik movement — Natan Sharansky, Vladimir Slepak and Ida Nudel — were arrested. He was finally granted an exit permit and emigrated to Israel on 27 January 1988, after 16 years of harassment by the KGB, together with his son, daughter-in-law and granddaughter.

Lerner accepted an appointment in the mathematics department at the Weizmann Institute of Science where he pursued a number of projects, including the development of an artificial heart and the construction of a mathematical model to predict the behavior of developed societies.

He died in 2004 in Rehovot at the age of 90.

== Famous followers ==
Vladimir Burkov, the head of the Laboratory of Active Systems in the V.A. Trapeznikov Institute of Control Sciences of RAS, Moscow, Russia.

Vladimir Vapnik, pioneer in statistical learning theory.
