= Morris H. DeGroot =

American statistician

Morris Herman DeGroot
- Born: June 8, 1931; Scranton, Pennsylvania
- Died: November 2, 1989 (aged 58); Pittsburgh, Pennsylvania
- Education: Roosevelt University; University of Chicago
- Awards: ASA Fellow (1966); IMS Fellow; AAAS Fellow
- Scientific career
- Fields: Statistics
- Workplaces: Carnegie Mellon University
- Doctoral advisor: Leonard Jimmie Savage
- Doctoral students: Kathryn Chaloner

Morris Herman DeGroot (June 8, 1931 – November 2, 1989) was an American statistician.

== Biography ==
Born in Scranton, Pennsylvania, DeGroot graduated from Roosevelt University and earned master's and doctor's degrees from the University of Chicago. DeGroot joined Carnegie Mellon in 1957 and became a university professor, the school's highest faculty position, serving in that position until his death from lung cancer in 1989.

He was the founding editor of the review journal Statistical Science.

== Academic works ==
He wrote six books, edited four volumes and authored over one hundred papers. Most of his research was on the theory of rational decision-making under uncertainty. His Optimal Statistical Decisions, published in 1970, is still recognized as one of the great books in the field. His courses on statistical decision theory taught at Carnegie-Mellon influenced Edward C. Prescott and Robert Lucas, Jr., influential figures in the development of new classical macroeconomics and real business-cycle theory. DeGroot's undergraduate text, Probability and Statistics, published in 1975, is widely recognized as a classic textbook.

=== Books ===
- DeGroot, M.H. & M.J. Schervish (2011), Probability and Statistics, 4th Ed, Pearson, ISBN 978-0-3215-0046-5
- DeGroot, M.H. & M.J. Schervish (2011), Student Solutions Manual for Probability and Statistics, Pearson, ISBN 978-0-3217-1598-2
- DeGroot, M.H. and M.J. Schervish (2002). Probability and Statistics (third ed.). Addison-Wesley. ISBN 978-0-201-52488-8.
- DeGroot, M.H. (1989), Probability and Statistics, 2nd Ed, Addison-Wesley, ISBN 978-0-2011-1366-2
- DeGroot, Morris H., Optimal Statistical Decisions. Wiley Classics Library. 2004. (Originally published (1970) by McGraw-Hill.) ISBN 0-471-68029-X.
- DeGroot, M.H., S.E. Fienberg & J.B. Kadane (1994), Statistics and the Law (1994), Wiley, ISBN 978-0-4710-5538-9
- DeGroot, M.H. and R.M. Cyert (1987). Bayesian Analysis and Uncertainty in Economic Theory. Rowman & Littlefield. ISBN 978-0-8476-7471-8.

== Awards and honors ==
DeGroot was elected fellow of the American Statistical Association, the Institute of Mathematical Statistics, the International Statistical Institute, the Econometric Society and the American Association for the Advancement of Science.

DeGroot was a recipient of the 1985 Otto Wirth Award for Outstanding Scholarship.

ISBA's DeGroot Prize is named for him.

== See also ==
- Becker–DeGroot–Marschak method
