= Yaron Singer =

Computer scientist and entrepreneur

- Education: University of California, Berkeley (PhD)
- Awards: Sloan Research Fellowship (2018); NSF CAREER Award
- Scientific career
- Fields: Computer science, machine learning, algorithms, optimization
- Workplaces: Harvard University; Robust Intelligence; Cisco Systems
- Doctoral advisor: Christos Papadimitriou

Yaron Singer is a computer scientist and entrepreneur whose research has focused on algorithms, machine learning, optimization, and the security of artificial intelligence systems. He was the Gordon McKay Professor of Computer Science and Applied Mathematics at Harvard University and co-founded Robust Intelligence, where he served as CEO. Cisco acquired Robust Intelligence in 2024. Singer is vice president of AI and security at Cisco's Foundation AI group.

== Education and academic career ==
Singer earned a PhD in computer science from the University of California, Berkeley in 2011. His dissertation, Incentives, Computation, and Networks: Limitations and Possibilities of Algorithmic Mechanism Design, was supervised by Christos Papadimitriou.

Before joining Harvard, Singer was a postdoctoral researcher at Google Research. Harvard appointed him full professor with tenure in 2020. He later held the Gordon McKay Professorship of Computer Science and Applied Mathematics. Singer left his professorship in 2023 and remains affiliated with Harvard as an associate in computer science.

== Research ==
Singer's doctoral research was in algorithmic mechanism design, including the computational limits of truthful mechanisms and the design of mechanisms subject to a fixed budget.

With Eric Balkanski, Singer developed algorithms for submodular optimization that evaluated multiple candidates in parallel, reducing the number of sequential steps needed to find a solution.

Singer has also studied adversarial machine learning, including how small changes to inputs can alter a model's predictions and how to make models more resistant to such attacks.

== Robust Intelligence and Cisco ==
Singer co-founded Robust Intelligence and served as its CEO. The company developed software for finding vulnerabilities in machine learning systems and blocking problematic inputs.

Cisco announced an agreement to acquire Robust Intelligence in August 2024 and completed the acquisition the following month. At Cisco, Singer became vice president of AI and security at Foundation AI.

== Recognition ==
Singer was named a Sloan Research Fellow in computer science in 2018. He has also received an NSF CAREER Award, a Google Faculty Research Award, and a Facebook Faculty Award. As a graduate student, he received fellowships from Microsoft Research and Facebook.

In 2012, Singer received the best student paper award at the ACM International Conference on Web Search and Data Mining for How to Win Friends and Influence People, Truthfully: Influence Maximization Mechanisms for Social Networks.
