= Edward H. Clarke =

American economist (1939–2013)

Edward Hedrick Clarke (December 23, 1939 - October 10, 2013) was an American Senior Economist with the Office of Management and Budget (Office of Information and Regulatory Affairs), which was involved in transportation regulatory affairs.

== Education ==
Born in Richmond, Virginia, Clarke was a graduate of Princeton University in 1962 and the University of Chicago, where he received an MBA in 1965. He wrote a doctoral dissertation at the same time, in which he invented the first method for preference revelation, but he failed his doctoral defense because Paul Samuelson and his doctoral advisor George Stigler believed his results to be impossible. Ten years later, in 1978, the University of Chicago economics faculty admitted their mistake and gave him a Ph.D. for his earlier work.

== Career ==
Clarke worked in public policy at the city/regional (Chicago), State, Federal and international levels. He worked for the Federal government as an economist for more than 35 years. With expertise in transportation economics and policy, he served as an urban economic analyst with the Real Estate Research Corporation of Chicago and the State of Illinois Bureau of the Budget (as economic advisor to the Director). In both of these jobs he was involved in various aspects of transportation finance and planning. He served as special assistant to the Secretary of the Treasury (George P. Shultz) and chief economist at A. I. D's Bureau of Planning and Policy Coordination. During the mid-1970s, he was heavily involved in airline and trucking deregulation and most recently in oversight of Federal regulatory activities affecting transportation.

== Recognition ==
Clarke's preference revelation work, which he had applied to public project selection, was noted in the Nobel Committee's award of the 1996 Nobel Prize in Economics to William Vickrey. Clarke's 1994 TRB paper (with Wayne Brough and Nicolaus Tideman), entitled "Airport Congestion and Noise, Interplay of Allocation and Distribution" illustrates the potential applicability of the Vickrey–Clarke–Groves mechanism to problems of transportation congestion. This method was the subject of Nobel Prizes awarded in 2007.

== Selected publications ==
- Clarke, Edward H. (September 1971), "Multipart pricing of public goods", Public Choice, 11 (1): 17–33, doi:10.1007/bf01726210, S2CID 154860771
- Clarke, Edward H. (1980), Demand Revelation and the Provision of Public Goods, Harper & Row
