= Michael A. Schwarz =

Michael A. Schwarz is an economist who specializes in marketplace design and decision-making theory. He is known especially for his role in designing advertising auctions for technology companies.

== Early life and education ==
Schwarz was born in Moscow on June 18, 1970. His father is Albert Schwarz, a mathematician and theoretical physicist. He emigrated to the United States in 1990, and earned a MS in physics from UC Davis and a PhD in economics from Stanford. He does not have a bachelors or undergraduate degree.

== Career ==
After earning his Ph.D., Schwarz spent 1999–2004 as an assistant professor of microeconomics at Harvard University. He has worked for Yahoo!, Google, and Microsoft. At Yahoo!, he headed the economics research unit – his transition to Yahoo! was covered in an article by The Wall Street Journal. Based on a study done with economist Michael Ostrovsky, Schwarz increased Yahoo's profits by millions of dollars a year by using economic theory to redesign the auction system used to sell advertisements. In 2006, Business Week reported that Schwarz and two of his students had “cracked” Google's AdWords code. Schwarz's work was cited by observers as evidence for why tech companies were hiring so many economists.

At Google, he led the team that created the carpool platform that became the foundation for Waze. Later, he was the Chief Economist for Google Cloud. He is currently Corporate Vice President and Chief Economist at Microsoft.

== Honors ==
- At Yahoo, Schwarz received the company's highest recognition, a Super Star award.
- In 2013, he was awarded the Prize in Game Theory and Computer Science of the Game Theory Society, "awarded to the person (or persons) who have published the best paper at the interface of game theory and computer science in the last decade."

== Selected works ==
- Schwarz, Michael; Ostrovsky, Michael (2009). "Reserve Prices in Internet Advertising Auctions: A Field Experiment". Stanford University Graduate School of Business Research Paper No. 2054. doi:10.2139/ssrn.1573947. S2CID 219337571.
- Schwarz, Michael; Sonin, Konstantin (2008). "A Theory of Brinkmanship, Conflicts, and Commitments". Journal of Law, Economics, & Organization. 24 (1): 163–183. doi:10.1093/jleo/ewm038. S2CID 153966904.
