= Preference revelation =

Public good valuation problem

In public choice theory, preference revelation (also preference revelation problem) is an area of study concerned with ascertaining the public's demand for public goods. According to some economists, if government planners do not have "full knowledge of individual preference functions", then it is likely that public goods will be under- or over-supplied. When there is no market to induce people to reveal their subjective valuations, economists say that there is a “problem of preference revelation.” When perfect compensation is possible in principle, it may be impossible in fact because of the problem of preference revelation

== Overview ==
Unlike private goods, public goods are non-excludable and non-rivalrous. This means that it is possible for people to benefit from a public good without having to help contribute to its production. Given that information about marginal benefits is available only from the individuals themselves, people have an incentive to under report their valuation for public goods.

== See also ==
- Contingent valuation
- Incentive compatibility
