= Incentive compatibility =

Concept in game theory

In game theory and economics, a mechanism is called incentive-compatible (IC) if every participant can achieve their own best outcome by reporting their true preferences. For example, there is incentive compatibility if high-risk clients are better off in identifying themselves as high-risk to insurance firms, who only sell discounted insurance to high-risk clients. Likewise, they would be worse off if they pretend to be low-risk. Low-risk clients who pretend to be high-risk would also be worse off. The concept is attributed to the Russian-born American economist Leonid Hurwicz.

== Typology ==
There are several different degrees of incentive-compatibility:

- The stronger degree is dominant-strategy incentive-compatibility (DSIC). This means that truth-telling is a weakly-dominant strategy, i.e. you fare best or at least not worse by being truthful, regardless of what the others do. In a DSIC mechanism, strategic considerations cannot help any agent achieve better outcomes than the truth; such mechanisms are called strategyproof, truthful, or straightforward.
- A weaker degree is Bayesian-Nash incentive-compatibility (BNIC). This means there is a Bayesian Nash equilibrium in which all participants reveal their true preferences. In other words, if all other players act truthfully, then it is best to be truthful.

Every DSIC mechanism is also BNIC, but a BNIC mechanism may exist even if no DSIC mechanism exists.

Typical examples of DSIC mechanisms are second-price auctions and a simple majority vote between two choices. Typical examples of non-DSIC mechanisms are ranked voting with three or more alternatives (by the Gibbard–Satterthwaite theorem) or first-price auctions.

== In randomized mechanisms ==
A randomized mechanism is a probability-distribution on deterministic mechanisms. There are two ways to define incentive-compatibility of randomized mechanisms:

- The stronger definition is: a randomized mechanism is universally-incentive-compatible if every mechanism selected with positive probability is incentive-compatible (i.e. if truth-telling gives the agent an optimal value regardless of the coin-tosses of the mechanism).
- The weaker definition is: a randomized mechanism is incentive-compatible-in-expectation if the game induced by expectation is incentive-compatible (i.e. if truth-telling gives the agent an optimal expected value).

== Revelation principles ==
The revelation principle comes in two variants corresponding to the two flavors of incentive-compatibility:

- The dominant-strategy revelation-principle says that every social-choice function that can be implemented in dominant-strategies can be implemented by a DSIC mechanism.
- The Bayesian–Nash revelation-principle says that every social-choice function that can be implemented in Bayesian–Nash equilibrium (Bayesian game, i.e. game of incomplete information) can be implemented by a BNIC mechanism.

== See also ==
- Implementability (mechanism design)
- Lindahl tax
- Monotonicity (mechanism design)
- Preference revelation
- Strategyproofness
