= Rebuild =

Rebuild may refer to:

== Music ==
- Rebuild (Scar Tissue album), 1998
- Rebuild (The Letter Black album), 2013
- Rebuild, a 2005 album by Verse
- "Rebuild" (song), by Matt Thiessen from Relient K, Dustin Ruth and Switchfoot
- "Rebuild", a song by Son Lux, composed by Ryan Lott, from We Are Rising

== Other ==
- Rebuild, a 2014 Green Lantern Corps comic book by Robert Venditti, DC Comics
- "Rebuild", a 2014 episode of Mistresses with Alyssa Milano

== See also ==
- Rebuild of Evangelion, a 2007 Japanese animated film series
- Rebuilding, the remanufacturing of old products
- Refurbishment (disambiguation)
- In sports, particularly in North America, a rebuild is used to signify when a team that has underperformed in recent years makes drastic changes to their rosters, coaching, and front office staff in hopes of securing higher draft picks and improve the team's performance in the near future (see also: Tanking).
