= Remanufacture =

Remanufacture may refer to:

- Remanufacturing, the process of reconditioning products to sound working condition
- Remanufacture - Cloning Technology, an album by Fear Factory

== See also ==
- Refurbishment (disambiguation)
