= VetDepot =

Online pet pharmacy

- Industry: Retail
- Founded: 2005
- Headquarters: Encinitas, California, U.S.
- Key people: Craig Gilmore, Founder
- Products: Pet Supplies
- Website: vetdepot.com

VetDepot is on online pet pharmacy founded in 2005 by Craig Gilmore, who also owns Gilmore & Co., Inc., a research and investment firm. Based in Encinitas, California, VetDepot sells pet medications, pet supplies, pet supplements, and other pet related products through the mail to all 50 U.S. states.

== Background ==
In 2011, VetDepot was named to the list of Inc. 500 Fastest Growing Companies in America. In 2011 and 2012, VetDepot was named to the Inc. 5000 list. VetDepot is certified to be a reputable online pharmacy through LegitScript, the leading source of internet pharmacy verification.

== Products ==
VetDepot offers both prescription and over-the-counter (OTC) products, including veterinary medications, nutritional supplements, vaccines, first aid products, grooming products, treats, pet food, toys, and other pet supplies. The company carries lines from dozens of manufacturers, including many of the best known brands in pet care.

Products are available for cats, dogs, fish, small pets, exotic pets, birds, horses, cattle, and other animals. VetDepot supplies directly to pet owners, veterinarians, animal shelters, and other customers.

== The Pet Hero Program ==
VetDepot launched its Pet Hero program to support individuals and organizations promoting animal welfare. The program provides donations and affiliate marketing partnerships.
