= Refurbishment (electronics) =

Restoration and testing of pre-owned electronic devices prior to resale

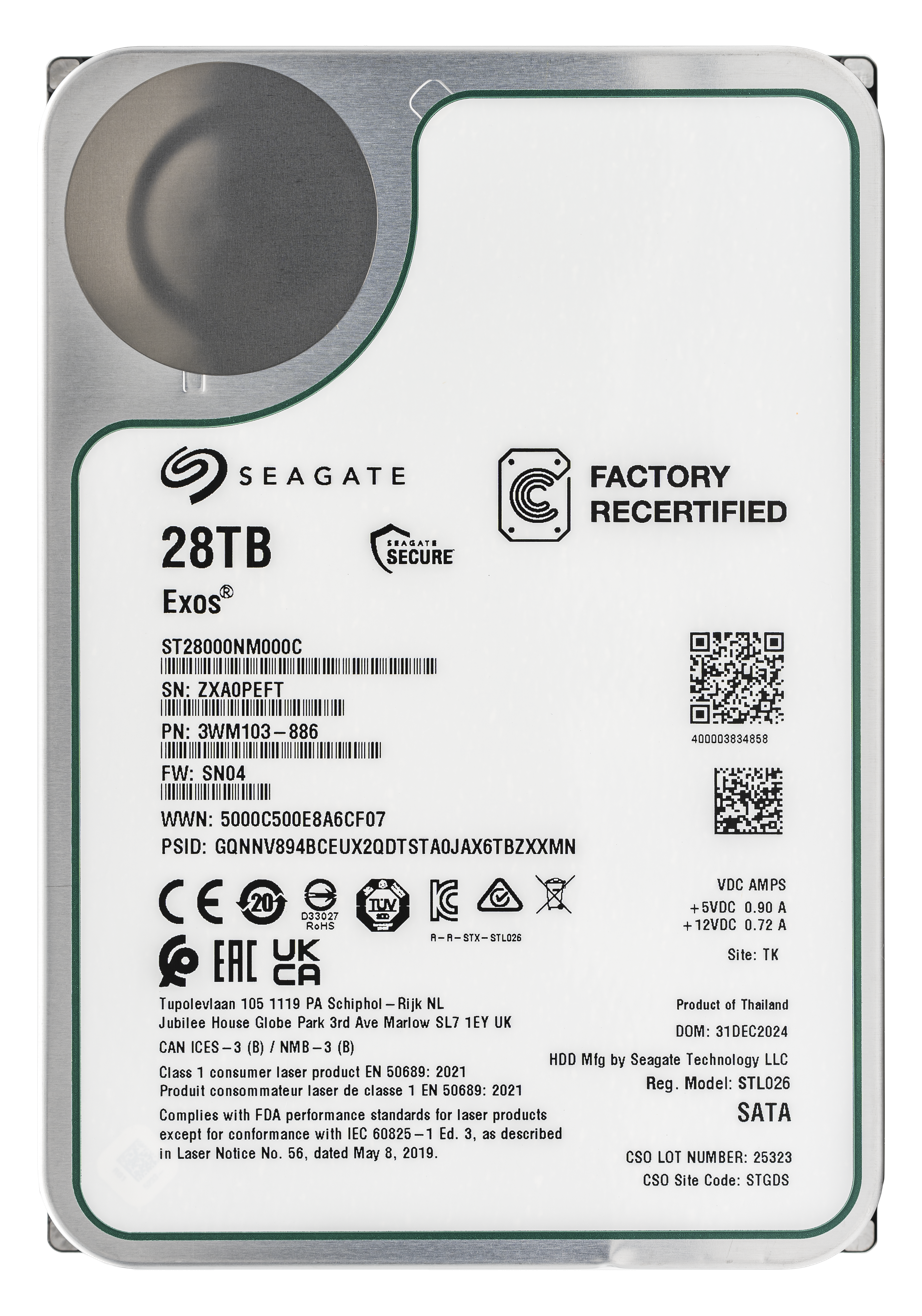
Hard drive with "FACTORY RECERTIFIED" marking

In electronics, refurbishment is the practice of restoring and testing a pre-owned electronic device so that it can be re-sold. Refurbished electronics are therefore pre-owned electronic devices (usually smartphones, tablets, or laptops), that have been tested by a reseller to confirm that they are fully working. Other refurbished electronics include smartwatches, games consoles, and cameras.

Usually, a refurbished electronic device is one that has been previously returned or re-sold to a retailer for any reason. They are then tested, and if necessary, repaired by a specialist refurbisher (or sometimes by the original manufacturer). Refurbished electronics may also be referred to as renewed, reconditioned, recycled, recertified, or "like new" electronics.

== Competing definitions ==
In many countries, the word "refurbished" is not legally protected (although France has introduced a legal definition as of 2022). This means that different electronics resellers will have different definitions of what counts as a refurbished device. In theory, a smartphone could be sold as 'refurbished' with no repairs or testing whatsoever. However, most refurbished devices have been rigorously tested to ensure they are fully working.

=== Used vs. refurbished ===
In the UK, the refurbished electronics marketplace Back Market claims that "refurbished" devices are distinct from "used" devices, where a "used" device is one where no repairs or testing have taken place. However other specialist retailers, like The Big Phone Store, define refurbished phones as a specific type of used or second-hand device.

=== Apple Certified Refurbished ===
Devices sold as 'Certified Refurbished' through the Apple store differ from most other refurbished devices. For example, iOS devices sold as Apple Certified Refurbished will always come with a brand-new battery and brand-new "outer shell". Because of this, these devices may be considered remanufactured, rather than refurbished.

== Common features ==
While in most countries there is no set legal definition, devices sold as "refurbished" tend to also come with the following assurances.

Testing and certification:

- Functionality testing: the device is fully functional and has not been tampered with.
- Software testing: the device has not been jailbroken or rooted.
- Authenticity checks: the device is not a fake.
- Network compatibility testing: the device is the correct country specification and is not blocked on any network.
- Background checks: the device is not blacklisted or reported stolen.
- Battery health testing: the device has a reasonably high battery health (usually at least 80%).
- Full data destruction and factory reset: the device retains no data from any previous owner.

Often, the testing process is fully automated. Commonly used testing certification providers include Phonecheck, NSYS Group, and Blackbelt.

Specialist retailers of refurbished devices typically provide:

- Warranty (typically 12 months)
- A transparent returns policy, with a 14-day "cooling-off" period.
- Secure, insured shipping.
- A clearly explained cosmetic grade (also referred to as the device's "condition").
- Basic accessories (such as a USB charging cable).
- Optional upgrades (such as replacing a partially used battery with a brand-new one).

Refurbished phone retailers also often sell standard accessories such as phone cases, screen protectors, headphones, and chargers.

== Conditions and grades ==
The 'Grade' or 'Condition' of a refurbished device describes how much wear and tear there is on the device. Some refurbished phone retailers will simply describe these with letter grades (i.e. Grade A, Grade B etc.), while others use their own naming convention. These grades are usually cosmetic descriptions only.

"Grading standards vary significantly between retailers, with some offering more lenient definitions of 'Grade A' than others."

The CTIA Wireless Device Grading Scales Criteria and Definitions documents define the industry standard for grading aftermarket wireless devices. It allows buyers and sellers of devices to utilize a common grading definition throughout the industry, providing efficiencies throughout the ecosystem and establishing common terminologies.

Common conditions:

- Like New: The device has no visible signs of use of any kind. These devices have usually never been used. Often, the only difference between a brand-new smartphone and a like-new refurbished phone is that the tamper-seal has been broken.
- Pristine / Excellent: The device may exhibit minor signs of use, such as micro-scratches. These should not be visible from a normal viewing distance (more than 12 inches). Also referred to as Premium by some retailers
- Very Good / Good: The device shows clear visible signs of use.
- Fair / Poor: The device shows heavy signs of use, such as deep scratches or even cracks. These devices may also feature other flaws such as reduced battery health.

Devices with heavier signs of use are priced lower, and on average may be less durable, than devices in perfect condition.

== Types of refurbished electronics retailer ==
Refurbished electronic devices are sold by a number of different kinds of retailer. These include:

=== Specialist retailers and independent refurbishers ===
Many independent electronics refurbishers operate their own online retail store. In the USA, refurbished electronics retailers include Gazelle, while in the UK, specialist retailers include Reboxed, Big Phone Store and Envirofone.

=== Device manufacturers ===
Manufacturers such as Apple and Samsung increasingly operate trade-in programs when buying a new device through their online store, which allows them to easily sell their own refurbished products.

=== Electronics retailers and mobile networks ===
A number of large electronics retailers, such as BestBuy in the USA, and Currys in the UK, sell both new and refurbished electronics. These are usually sourced from an independent refurbisher. Cellular network providers have begun to offer refurbished devices on contract. These are often devices that have been traded in to a network provider as part of a contract upgrade.

=== Online marketplaces ===
Back Market and Mozillion are examples of online marketplaces specialising in pre-owned electronics. Meanwhile ur, sell.ur Swappa, Amazon, TikTok Shop, eBay, Ovantica are all large online platforms where independent electronics refurbishers can sell their products. Marketplaces often provide the most choice for the consumer, but do not take direct responsibility for the devices sold.

== Consumer demand ==
Global demand for refurbished electronic devices has steadily risen since 2014. According to a 2024 report by GfK, this is primarily driven by cost, as well as the increasing necessity of owning digital devices. According to the same report, another contributing factor is increased environmental awareness, as both smartphone manufacture and electronic waste are sources of pollution.

In particular, the UK has seen steady growth in the refurbished phone market, with research showing that refurbished phones accounted for 1 in 4 smartphones sold in 2023.

== See also ==
- Factory second
- Reverse logistics network modelling
- Right to repair
