= Guideline committee VDI 2343 =

The guideline committee VDI 2343 "Recycling of electrical and electronic devices" was initiated in 1996 by Ralf Brüning. The aim is to develop practical and legally compliant recommendations for action in order to support the affected groups in their work, for expample disposal companies, manufacturers, universities, authorities, lawyers, environmental associations, reuse companies. Thereby among other things the aspects of logistics, dismantling, processing, recycling and reuse are dealt with in seven sub-committees and coordinated in an overall committee.

== Activity ==
As part of the VDI guideline work, technical rules are drawn up on a voluntary basis by experts from interested parties in voluntary work. When creating the guidelines, the goals and principles set out in VDI guideline 1000 must be observed. The objectives of the guideline work include the specification of legal terms in the sense of the respective legal definition as well as the harmonization of terms and technical language regulations. Each VDI guideline committee must be staffed in such a way that all legitimate interests are adequately represented. The VDI guideline committee 2343 has continuously developed from a small committee and has now grown to over 120 experts. All parts of the series of guidelines are available in German and English in order to take account of the growing international network of companies.

== Content ==
The structure of the guideline is based on the logistical chain that electrical and electronic devices go through when they are disposed of. There are currently 7 parts that are being worked on in individual sub-committees. These are presented individually below:

=== Part1: Principles and terminology ===
Part 1 defines the necessary terms and refers to the relevant laws, standards and guidelines. Part 1 also describes the legal framework for the disposal of electrical and electronic equipment and the area of product stewardship. In addition to these basics, Part 1 also defines the objectives of the series of guidelines. Among other things, the objectives of the guideline include the creation of a technical basis for the collection, proper transport and the requirements for the dismantling, reuse, treatment and marketing of electrical and electric devices or individual material flows from this sector.

=== Part 2: Logistics ===
This part deals with the complex relationships between internal and external logistics. The particular challenge lies in the diversity of the collection of electrical and electric devices, in the multitude of potential collection points, in the choice of return systems and in the coordination of the logistics interfaces. In addition to the material flow, the flow of information is also discussed. The implementation of external logistical tasks requires an infrastructure that makes it possible, through networked collection, storage and transport systems, under cost-optimized conditions, to have waste electrical and electronic devices at the right place, at the right time, in the required quality and in optimal quantities to deliver. The part 2 therefore analyzes, among other things, the different fields of application of pick-up and bring-back systems and presents their advantages and disadvantages. In addition, the part 2 gives an overview and an evaluation of transport and loading aids for the technical implementation of disposal logistics. In this context, positive and negative examples for the provision of equipment are presented.

=== Part 3: Disassembly ===
Part 3 contains information and procedural suggestions with regard to the proper and targeted dismantling of electrical and electric devices and for dismantling planning. This Part focuses on questions about the possibilities and areas of application of the manual, partially automated and / or fully automated dismantling of old electrical and electronic devices. In particular, the Part provides assistance in deciding between reprocessing a complete device, dismantling reusable assemblies and creating fractions for recycling. The aim is to achieve an economic result of the dismantling depth, taking into account the ratio of effort and benefit. In order to provide comprehensive assistance, the Part introduces sub-functions and dismantling procedures. Depending on the respective objective of the dismantling and the separation process used, a distinction can be made between non-destructive, partially destructive or destructive dismantling processes. As a rule, dismantling processes consist of a combination of these separation processes, with which pollutant and valuable materials, components and assemblies are separated. In addition, Part 3 examines the suitability of different tools for different dismantling tasks and methods.

=== Part 4: Preparation techniques ===
Part 4 presents the most important processing methods and explains their advantages and disadvantages. It differentiates between manual, mechanical, chemical and thermal processes. A special focus is on the mechanical processes. These essentially include crushing, classifying and sorting in appropriate systems. The objective is the separation of pollutants and disruptive substances according to technical and legal requirements as well as the production of material flows for recycling or disposal. This also includes the description of device-specific processing methods, for example for screens or cooling devices. In addition to the treatment processes, part 4 also deals with secondary processes such as exhaust air cleaning from the process engineering systems.

=== Part 5: Material and thermal recycling and removal ===
Before any recycling, possible strategies for reusing entire devices or components and / or parts should first be examined so that the added value is largely retained. If this test gives a negative result, the recycling of the materials used should be aimed for. This is what part 5 deals with. The aim of recycling is to gain secondary resources. As a result, primary resources can be saved, the amount of waste generated and economic potential can be exploited. In principle, the utilization can be divided into material ("recycling") and energetic recovery. For the material fractions obtained from waste electrical and electronic devices - depending on the selected recycling process - certain boundary conditions with regard to permissible input specifications must be observed, which significantly determine the operational expenditure in the respective recycling facility for the waste devices. This Part therefore shows which recycling routes the fractions from a treatment plant can take. In order to achieve the stated goals, the part 5 divides the fractions obtained for practical reasons into the areas of metals (ferrous metals, non-ferrous metals, critical metals), plastics and glass fractions. Corresponding ways of recycling or disposal are described based on practical applications. Interfering fractions and additives are also discussed.

=== Part 6: Marketing ===
This part is intended to ensure that the recyclable materials contained in waste devices are made available to the economic cycle again after the devices are no longer in use. Targeted measures are intended to protect the environment from the release of substances that are necessary and useful in the devices, but otherwise harmful. Part 6 is intended to give recycling companies specific recommendations for action on the economic marketing of the material flows resulting from treatment. For example, the areas of ferrous metals, non-ferrous metals, plastics, technical glasses and critical materials are considered. Part 6 contains descriptions of the individual fractions as well as information on the expected quality of the fractions in the market and on possible value-reducing components or interfering substances. In addition, information about the identification of fractions, waste codes, Basel- or OECD-codes, the notification requirement and typical transport units is given.

=== Part 7: Reuse ===
The reuse of (waste) electrical and electronic devices offers the highest added value within the different types of recycling, as the already created value of existing parts is retained. Compared to manufacturing a new product, up to 90% of the material and energy can be saved. In order to further promote reuse, part 7 of the guideline helps to define minimum standards for reuse. The guideline particularly considers legal, technical, economic, ecological and social aspects. The part “Reuse” also deals with sales-promoting measures in re-marketing and finally presents positive examples for reuse in selected groups of devices. It summarizes the typical reuse process for the respective device.

== Cooperation ==
The guideline committee has grown steadily over the years and gradually more and more stakeholder groups have become involved. Due to the technical progress and new legal regulations, more device categories and device types, newtreatment options are moving into the focus of the recycling industry. Much still remains to be done for the guidelinecommittee in the future. It is currently being discussed whether further sub-committees should be formed due to the increasingly complex issue. At the moment there is still the possibility to work on this guideline and to actively shape it.

== Related guidelines ==
- VDI guidelines "Recycling-oriented product development" VDI 2243
- VDI guidelines "Recycling of cars – Quality of recycled car parts” VDI 4080, "Recycling of cars – Draining and preparation of vehicles” VDI 4082, Corrective maintenance and remanufacturing of internal combustion engines – Terminology and processes VDI 4084
- VDI guidelines "Planning, construction and managing of scrapyards – Facilities and equipment for the handling, storage and treatment of scraps and other materials" VDI 4085
- VDI guidelines "Logistic of waste disposal in producing enterprises" VDI 4413, Ecology-minded purchasing of indirect materials” VDI 4430, “Life-cycle management in the manufacturing industry” VDI 4431, “Management of waste from industry and business” VDI 4432
- VDI guidelines "Terminology of waste treatment and energy management - Fundamentals" VDI 4091
