= Valnet =

Canadian digital media company

Valnet, Inc.
- Type: Subsidiary
- Industry: Media
- Founded: August 2012; 14 years ago
- Founders: Hassan Youssef; Sam Youssef
- Headquarters: Montreal, Quebec, Canada
- Parent: Valsef Group
- Subsidiaries: Android Police; Comic Book Resources; Collider; Hardcore Gamer; MovieWeb; OpenCritic; Screen Rant; Game Rant; DualShockers; TheGamer; XDA Developers; How-To Geek; GiveMeSport; Polygon; MakeUseOf; CarBuzz; HotCars; TopSpeed; Military.com
- Website: www.valnetinc.com

Valnet, Inc. is a Canadian media company established in August 2012 by Hassan and Sam Youssef in Montreal, Quebec. It operates primarily in the entertainment media industry, where it has sought to acquire producers of content in this space. In this way, it has become the parent company of several internet media publications including TheGamer, Collider, Comic Book Resources, MovieWeb, Screen Rant, Game Rant, XDA Developers, GiveMeSport, MakeUseOf, How-To Geek, CarBuzz, HotCars, TopSpeed, and Military.com.

There have been complaints from writers about working conditions and the low pay offered by the company, and employees have said the company prioritises "mass quantity over quality" and "SEO bait" content.

== History ==
Matt Keezer, Stephane Manos, Sam Youssef, and Hassan Youssef met through their common interest in competitive foosball, and started a business in online pornography in 2003, growing their successful enterprise under the Brazzers name. Keezer began Pornhub under the company Interhub separately from Brazzers, and the businesses remained silent partners. In 2009, Interhub hosted videos of the rape of an underage girl, according to a BBC News report in 2020. The founders sold their pornography assets in March 2010 to Fabian Thylmann, while the Youssef brothers took time off from business, until they eventually founded Valnet in August 2012. Sam Youssef later invested in Constellation Software, whose business model he reportedly loved.

The company started a YouTube channel in January 2016 called "Little Angel", which provides animated content aimed at toddlers. By April 6, 2016, the company acquired Comic Book Resources (CBR), with Valnet CEO Hassan Youssef retaining the editorial team and taking over their offices. On November 17, 2020, Valnet announced that it had acquired Collider. Valnet acquired XDA along with four other websites—Pocketnow, AppAdvice, BackyardBoss and Hook&Bullet—from Busy Pixel Media in February 2022. Also that month, the company sold Little Angel to Moonbug, the owner of Cocomelon. Terms of the deal were not disclosed.

In May 2023, it was reported that Valnet had laid off several key figures at CBR, including editor-in-chief Adam Swiderski, senior new editor Stephen Gerding, and senior features editor Christopher Baggett. In June, it was reported that CBR's employees had been finding difficulty in keeping up with Valnet's content demand. The company was reportedly "seemingly firing those who try and stand up for writers" in its bid to attempt to improve its work culture and performance. Fired staff vocalized discontent for these firings on Twitter, due to what was allegedly the full shutdown of the website news section, which the company refuted.

Valnet acquired OpenCritic by August 2024 in an attempt to integrate the aggregator into its other businesses in the gaming sector. It announced plans to turn the site into a social media platform. The company signed a lease for the 740 Broadway building in New York City by October 2024, being the company's first offices in the city.

TheWrap spoke to 15 current or former Valnet contractors in 2025 regarding alleged exploitative working conditions at the company; one freelancer had also recently filed a lawsuit against the company for exploitation. TheWrap's article led to Valnet and Hassan Youssef filing a lawsuit in April 2025 against the website's company The Wrap News Inc. for libel.

On May 1, 2025, Valnet acquired Polygon from Vox Media; the site was subsequently hit with mass layoffs. In June, it acquired Military.com, and despite the website being profitable, laid off staffers, and stopped publishing in-depth news coverage.

== Subsidiaries ==
=== Collider ===
Logo of Collider

Collider is an online entertainment publication, with a focus on the film industry and television series. Collider focuses on entertainment news, analysis, and commentary, along with original features, complementary film and television reviews, editorials, and interviews.

Collider was founded in 2005 by editor-in-chief Steven Weintraub as a blog. In 2015, Weintraub sold Collider to Complex Media, who would manage the business and advertisements on the website and offer editing support. On November 17, 2020, Valnet announced that it had acquired Collider.

=== CBR ===
Relaunched logo used between 2016 and 2023

CBR, formerly Comic Book Resources, is a news website covering movies, television, anime, video games and comic book–related news and discussion. Comic Book Resources was founded by Jonah Weiland in 1995 as a development of the Kingdom Come Message Board, a message forum that Weiland created to discuss DC Comics' then-new mini-series of the same name.

CBR has featured columns by industry professionals such as Robert Kirkman, Gail Simone, and Mark Millar. Other columns were published by comic book historians and critics such as George Khoury and Timothy Callahan.

By April 4, 2016, CBR was sold to Valnet, after which the site was relaunched as CBR.com on August 23, 2016, with the blogs integrated into the site. Popverse reported that following the acquisition by Valnet "comics were increasingly sidelined for coverage [...], as were both reviews and columns as focuses for publishing; instead, the site refocused on shorter news pieces and reactions to news stories". Valnet Inc. is a subsidiary of Valsef Group, which is also headquartered in Montreal.

=== MakeUseOf ===
MakeUseOf logo

MakeUseOf (also styled MUO) is a technology website publishing how-to guides, tutorials, and explainers covering operating systems, software, productivity, and consumer hardware. It was founded by Aibek Esengulov and Kaly Mochoev, launching in July 2006. Valnet's own acquisition announcement instead describes the site as having been "founded in 2007 as a technology blog".

Valnet acquired MakeUseOf on July 6, 2020, in a deal with undisclosed terms; it was the company's first acquisition in the technology vertical. MakeUseOf is now presented as Valnet's flagship technology brand, grouped within a "Technology Portfolio" alongside Android Police, XDA, Pocket-lint, and How-To Geek.

=== How-To Geek ===
How-To Geek is a technology website founded in 2006 by Lowell Heddings. It was acquired by Valnet in 2023.

=== MovieWeb ===
Logo of MovieWeb

MovieWeb is an entertainment news website and video brand that reports on entertainment news through its website. The site also maintains a searchable database of films.

MovieWeb first launched in 1995; by 1997 it was reported to be in operation supported by a 4-person team publishing movie information that, while not 'slick', had a 'certain charm'. In 2012, MovieWeb produced a popular video which was an '80s-themed parody mashup of The Walking Dead series accompanied by music from Growing Pains that went viral.

In 2021, it was estimated the MovieWeb website had 8 million unique visits for the month of July. MovieWeb has been owned and operated by online publisher Valnet Inc. since September 2021 upon completion of the acquisition from WatchR.

=== GiveMeSport ===
GiveMeSport is a sports publishing website founded in 2014 in the United Kingdom. It was acquired by Valnet in 2022 as part of the acquisition of the digital sports publishing network SN&CK Media Ltd.

=== OpenCritic ===
Logo of OpenCritic

OpenCritic is a review aggregation website for video games. OpenCritic lists reviews from critics across multiple video game publications for the games listed on the site. The website then generates a numeric score by averaging all of the numeric reviews. Several other metrics are also available, such as the percentage of critics that recommend the game and its relative ranking across all games on OpenCritic. OpenCritic was launched in 2015 to avoid some of the controversies that Metacritic has gained in the video game industry. A game's Metacritic score has become strongly attached to the financial performance of a game and subsequent efforts of the development studio and publisher, such as affecting post-release studio bonuses. However, Metacritic provides limited details of how it calculates its review scores, and uses weighted averaging that favors some publications over others, leading many to criticize the heavy weight that the industry puts on the site. Valnet's acquisition of OpenCritic was announced on July 31, 2024.

=== Screen Rant and Game Rant ===
Logos of Screen Rant (top) and Game Rant (bottom)

Screen Rant is an entertainment website that offers news in the fields of television, films, Video games, and film theories. It was launched by Vic Holtreman in 2003, and originally had its primary office in Ogden, Utah. Screen Rant has expanded its coverage with red-carpet events in Los Angeles, New York Film Festivals and San Diego Comic-Con panels. Its sister website, Game Rant, dedicated to coverage of video games, launched in 2009.

In February 2015, Screen Rant was acquired by Valnet, and was reunited with its sister site, Game Rant, in 2019, when Valnet acquired the other publication. Screen Rant features a video series called Pitch Meetings by YouTube comedian Ryan George. By September 2020, the series included over 200 videos, garnering a combined 250 million views. In the series, George plays both a screenwriter and a film producer in a pitch for a film or television series, describing its plot in a way that highlights various inconsistencies and the way monetary incentives affect the movie industry.

=== XDA ===
Logo of XDA

XDA (formerly known as XDA Developers) is a mobile software development community launched on December 20, 2002.

XDA-Developers.com was created by Dutch company NAH6 Crypto Products BV and launched on December 20, 2002. In January 2011, XDA Developers was bought by the US based company JB Online Media, LLC. and subsequently by Canada-based Valnet Inc. in February 2022. The name XDA Developers is originally derived from the O_{2} Xda, which was marketed as a personal digital assistant (PDA) with extra features.

In February 2007, when the Microsoft Windows Mobile OS was widely used on mobile phones, Microsoft asked XDA Developers to remove all ROMs created by OEMs. In 2008, CNET Asia suggested that XDA Developers offers potential solutions to problems with many Android-based mobile devices. In other mobile phone reviews, testers at CNET preferred using XDA Developers' ROMs when carrying out detailed reviews.

In 2013, XDA partnered with Swappa to become its official marketplace where users can buy or sell devices.

=== TheGamer ===
Logo of TheGamer

TheGamer was launched in 2017 as an original video game news website by Valnet themselves, rather than being purchased from an outside organisation. In 2025, the publication was subject to mass layoffs, including the entire features team. In 2026, Valnet announced plans for a "pay by click" regime at the publication, with writers and editors being paid $5 and $3 respectively per 1,000 views in the first 15 days after publication rather than a fixed rate per article, with articles garnering under 1,000 views not being paid at all.

=== Polygon ===
Logo of Polygon

Polygon is an American entertainment website created by Vox Media covering video games, movies, television, and other popular culture. At its October 2012 launch as Vox Media's third property, Polygon sought to distinguish itself by focusing on the stories of the people behind video games and long-form magazine-style feature articles.

The site was built over the course of ten months by eight co-founding editors which included the editors-in-chief of the gaming sites Joystiq, Kotaku and The Escapist. Vox Media produced a documentary series on the founding of the site. In May 2025, Polygon was sold to Valnet, which was followed by mass layoffs.

=== Military.com ===
Logo of Military.com

Military.com is a website that provides news and information about the United States military, service members, veterans, and their families as well as foreign policy and broader national security issues. It was founded by Christopher Michel in 1999 and went live in 2000. Its advisory board originally included two former members of the Joint Chiefs of Staff, as well as other academic and business leaders. In 2004, Military.com was acquired by Monster Worldwide in 2004 for around $39.5 million. It was acquired by Valnet in 2025, which was followed by mass layoffs.

== Reception ==
According to TheWrap, previous and current Valnet employees claim the company prioritizes "mass quantity over quality to churn out mind-numbing SEO bait." Once websites are acquired by Valnet, the permanent staff are usually replaced by contractors, who are paid significantly less (reportedly around $19 for 1000 words at GameRant) than the former tenured staff. One former contributor described Valnet website Collider to TheWrap as "a content mill, borderline like almost sweatshop-level", while another writer suggested that Valnet forced contractors to create "junky clickbait" content. Valnet writers who complain about payment, working conditions, or reveal payment rates are alleged to be blacklisted by the company.

== See also ==
- List of Internet forums
