= Swappa =

American e-commerce company

Swappa, LLC
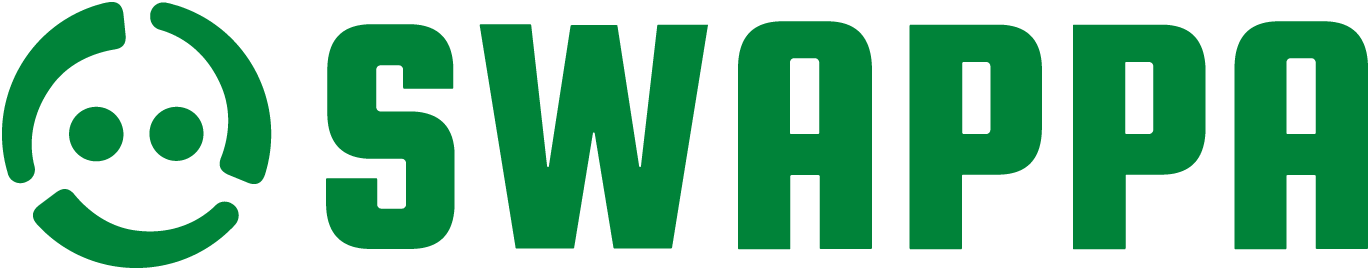
- Type: Private
- Industry: E-commerce
- Founded: Kansas City, Missouri (2010)
- Founder: Ben Edwards
- Headquarters: Kansas City, MO, United States
- Key people: Ben Edwards (CEO)
- Website: https://swappa.com

Swappa is a user-to-user marketplace for buying and selling new and gently used technology.

== History ==
Swappa was founded by Ben Edwards and launched on December 5, 2010. Swappa is headquartered in Kansas City, Missouri, and is a remote workplace with employees spread across the United States and around the world, including Ecuador, Greece, India, and Thailand.

The Swappa marketplace was launched with the goal of building a safer and simpler marketplace, and to serve as an alternative to other online marketplaces such as eBay and Craigslist.

== Products sold on Swappa ==
Swappa launched in 2010 as an Android only marketplace, but started expanding the available device categories in 2012. The first new category was added in 2012 and allowed sellers to create listings for iPhones. The Swappa marketplace now allows sellers to list the following:

- iPhone and Android smartphones
- iPad and Android tablets
- Smartwatches
- Cameras
- Camera lenses
- Home tech
- Video game consoles
- Select laptop computers
- iMac & Mac Mini desktop computers
- GPUs

== Buying on Swappa ==
Swappa users can purchase a listing from a Swappa seller with a Swappa account or by using a guest account. The Swappa marketplace allows buyers to find items using the on-site navigation system or the search bar. Buyers pay the amount shown on the listing page, and the price shown to buyers includes standard shipping costs. After a buyer makes a purchase, they are given access to a private sale page to communicate directly with the seller and Swappa staff.

== Selling on Swappa ==
All Swappa sellers are required to have a Swappa account. Swappa users can use a standard Swappa account to list items for sale. Swappa also has a Trusted Seller program and an Enterprise Seller program.

Listings from sellers using a standard Swappa account or from sellers who are part of the Trusted Seller program are reviewed by Swappa's moderation team before they are approved for sale. The listing review process includes reviewing verification photos, checking the ESN or Serial Number, making sure the device meets the required criteria, and the sellers account history.

=== Swappa Product Condition Categories ===
Swappa defines conditions as New, Mint, Good, and Fair. The requirements for each category have been defined as follows:

- New: Unopened retail packaging (factory sealed)
- Mint: Pristine condition, no signs of wear and tear
- Good: Excellent condition, minor wear, and tear
- Fair: Noticeable wear and tear

=== Swappa Device Criteria Requirements ===
Swappa requires all devices to be fully functional including all functions of the screen, buttons, ports, and camera. Listed devices must have a functional battery that properly charges and discharges. Devices must have a clean ESN ready for activation, and they cannot have an outstanding financial obligation with a carrier or have any cracked or chipped glass, water damage, or other structural issues.

== Payments and Fees on Swappa ==
Swappa uses PayPal for Marketplaces to process payments. According to Swappa, PayPal is used for payment processing because of the protections offered for buyers and sellers.

PayPal Purchase Protections for buyers include coverage for items that are damaged or lost in shipping and for items that are not as advertised. PayPal's buyer protections also include dispute resolution and are valid for 180 days from the date of purchase. PayPal protections for sellers include fraud protection and offer protection against unauthorized transactions and claims for items not received.

Selling on Swappa is free for sellers. Buyers pay a sale fee already included in the displayed price on the listing. The Swappa sale fee is tiered based on the seller's asking price.

== Swappa Services ==
=== ESN/IMEI/MEID checks ===
Swappa requires all cellular-connected devices to be fully functional, ready for activation, and have a clean ESN / IMEI / MEID. Swappa employs a team of moderators that review listings before they are approved to ensure listed devices meet the requirements. Swappa also provides a free ESN check service that is available to the public.

=== Repair Network ===
The Swappa Repair Network originally launched in 2017. The Swappa Repair Network is a directory of 2,000+ repair shops that can repair smartphones, tablets, and other technology. Swappa re-launched the Repair Network in 2020 and introduced a Repair Calculator to assist users in determining the cost of repairing a broken phone.

=== Protection plans ===
Swappa partnered with Warranty Life in 2016 to provide protection plans for used phones purchased from the Swappa marketplace. In 2018, Swappa and Warranty Life began offering protection plans for used MacBooks purchased from the Swappa marketplace. The Warranty Life protection plans include 1 year of coverage and cover issues such as broken screens, water damage, and power surges.

=== Swappa Local ===
Swappa Local was introduced in June 2019 as a way for buyers and sellers to connect and meet up locally but was discontinued. Swappa no longer supports local pickup arrangements as this can void the payment protections offered by PayPal. However, if both seller and buyer agree and understand the limited protections, local pickup can be arranged on the private sale page.

=== Carrier Phone Plans and reviews ===
In December 2019, Swappa added carrier Phone Plan pages. The Phone Plan pages outline the wireless plans available from the three major U.S. wireless carriers, AT&T, Verizon, and T-Mobile, as well as those from MVNO carriers. The Phone Plan pages also include a section for Swappa users to review and rate wireless carriers.

== Growth ==
Swappa facilitated $500,000 in seller proceeds in 2011 and reported $1,000,000 in seller proceeds for 2012. Reported seller proceeds for years 2013 - 2017 are as follows:

- 2013: $7,000,000
- 2014: $23,000,000
- 2015: $43,000,000
- 2016: $60,000,000
- 2017: $77,000,000

Seller proceeds for 2018 were reported as $92 million, and total over $300 million since Swappa was founded in 2010.

== Recognition ==
- 2013: mobile software development community XDA made Swappa its official marketplace for devices.
- 2016: the Wall Street Journal noted Swappa as being The Smart Way to Trade in Old Gadgets for Cash.
- 2018: the New York Times noted Swappa as being a good way to buy a used phone without getting fleeced.
- 2018: Swappa received the Sitejabber Customer Choice Award.
- 2019: Swappa was noted as one of the most reputable places you can shop online for used phones by CNN.
- 2020: the Los Angeles Times included Swappa as part of a list of the best places to sell your used phone online.
- 2020: The Today Show included Swappa in their story about creating a virtual classroom at home.
