= Better Business Bureau =

American private nonprofit organization

International Association of Better Business Bureaus, Inc.
- Founded: 1912; 114 years ago
- Type: 501(c)(6) non-profit organization
- Tax ID no.: 52-1070270
- Purpose: Consumer education Industry self-regulation
- Headquarters: 4250 N Fairfax Drive, Suite 600 Arlington, Virginia U.S. 22203
- Region served: United States and Canada
- Products: BBB Business Reviews; Accreditation for businesses Dispute resolution services
- Services: Rating site
- Subsidiaries: BBB Wise Giving Alliance
- Revenue: $215 million
- Expenses: $20 million
- Employees: 2,500
- Website: bbb.org

The Better Business Bureau (BBB) is an American private, 501(c)(6) nonprofit organization founded in 1912. The BBB consists of 92 independently incorporated local BBB organizations in the United States and Canada, coordinated under the International Association of Better Business Bureaus (IABBB) in Arlington, Virginia. Its self-described mission is to advance marketplace trust.

The Better Business Bureau is not affiliated with any governmental agency. Businesses that affiliate with the BBB and adhere to its standards do so through industry self-regulation. To avoid bias, the BBB's policy is to refrain from recommending or endorsing any specific business, product or service, although it advocates for business interests.

The BBB rating system uses an A+ through F letter-grade scale. The grades represent the organization's degree of confidence that the business is operating in good faith and will resolve customer concerns filed with the BBB.

According to the BBB, nearly 400,000 local businesses in North America were accredited as of July 2022. The BBB vets businesses to become dues-paying 'accredited businesses' that pledge and continue to adhere to the BBB Code of Business Practices. In return, the BBB allows accredited businesses in good standing to use its trademarked logo in marketing materials.

== History ==
The BBB traces its roots to the U.S. government's 1906 lawsuit United States v. Forty Barrels and Twenty Kegs of Coca-Cola, which prompted increased scrutiny of misleading advertising practices. In response to public concern, local "vigilance committees" formed across the United States by 1912 to monitor and discourage unethical business behavior. These groups were largely driven by figures such as Samuel Candler Dobbs of the American Advertising Federation, who had been advocating for truth in advertising since at least 1911. The BBB's original mission was to investigate financial fraud relating to advertisements.

The first local BBB was formed in Minneapolis, Minnesota, in 1914. The National Vigilance Committee officially became the BBB in 1916. The BBB's New York affiliate was incorporated in 1922. In 1927, the organization announced the formation of an auxiliary committee to cooperate with the bureau in suppressing financial and mercantile fraud. It consisted of 27 businessmen in the financial, industrial, railroad, and legal industries. A consumer department was formed as a separate division in 1939.

By 1967, the New York City bureau was handling 260,000 inquiries and requests for service each year. Around this time, its 130 local bureaus began to focus less on fraud and more on misleading or confusing advertising and complaints about service. The Council of Better Business Bureaus was formed in 1970 to coordinate the national organization's local offices. One of its first efforts was to improve local telephone systems. By 1971, there were 150 autonomous bureaus around the country.

In 1983, the New York bureau, the largest affiliate in the country, had 6,000 members, more than 100 full- and part-time staff, and an annual budget of $1.45 million. It had five branches, in Newark, Paramus, White Plains, Wappingers Falls, and Farmingdale. In 1987, the branch covering Los Angeles and Orange counties closed. It was replaced six months later by the Southland bureau, a merger of the closed affiliate and the San Bernardino county office. In 1989, 180 local bureaus handled about 10.7 million inquiries. In 1991, some bureaus introduced a 900 number that charged callers to file a complaint or ask about a business. In 1996, the BBB voted in favor of charging fees to the public for its services. In the late 1990s, It also introduced BBBOnline, a subsidiary tasked with vetting internet-based businesses and their websites. In 1998, a privacy seal was made available for those who paid an annual fee and met certain criteria.

In 2007, the BBB introduced a new logo and the tagline “Start With Trust” in an effort to rebrand itself as a proactive, not just reactive, organization. On August 16, 2011, the Council of Better Business Bureaus merged its U.S. and Canadian operations into a single North American system. That consolidation was intended to streamline cross‑border complaint management, consumer access, and business accreditation infrastructure. By 2013, the organization maintained a database of nearly five million businesses, including more than 400,000 accredited companies.

== Structure and funding ==
The BBB is part of a private nonprofit federation operating in the United States and Canada. Local BBB organizations are independently incorporated but overseen by the IABBB, which sets standards and monitors compliance.

It is funded almost entirely by dues paid by accredited businesses. Critics argue that this funding model creates a conflict of interest because business representatives often make up a large share of local boards and executive leadership, up to 90% in some jurisdictions.

== Dispute resolution procedures ==
The BBB offers several types of alternative dispute resolution (ADR), including conciliation, mediation, informal dispute settlement, and both conditionally binding and binding arbitration.

After a complaint is filed, the BBB forwards it to the business within two business days and asks the business to respond within 14 calendar days. If the business does not respond, the BBB follows up. Most cases are closed within approximately 30 days with statuses such as “resolved,” “answered,” “unanswered,” or “unresolved.”

Critics contend that the process remains superficial. Sometimes parties with unresolved grievances are offered gift certificates for case closure, raising questions about effectiveness. The BBB lacks legal enforcement power; it provides mediation rather than judicial resolution.

== Rating system and accreditation ==
In 2009, the BBB introduced a letter-grade rating system (A+ to F), replacing its earlier Satisfactory/Unsatisfactory system. Ratings are computed based on factors such as complaint patterns, transparency, advertising reliability, time in business, and responsiveness to customers.

Initially, accreditation added four points to a business's rating score. In 2010, media reports alleged that some businesses received higher grades immediately after paying accreditation fees, and Connecticut’s Attorney General criticized the system as misleading. The BBB then removed accreditation as a rating factor and pledged reforms.

== Criticism ==
By the 1970s, the BBB had come under regular criticism. Consumer advocates questioned the effectiveness of self-regulation. Local bureaus, such as the one in Harlem, were criticized for failing to meet the needs of the population. Affiliates were criticized by consumer activists for inconsistent service standards and unreliable logging of complaints. Some accused the BBB of protecting dues-paying businesses at the expense of consumers by ignoring complaints outright.

In 1997, the organization's South Florida office was shut down because of poor management and high debt. Complaints about other Florida branches included misleading telemarketing calls. In 2002, the North Jersey office based in Parsippany was expelled from the organization for failing to meet certain standards.

When the BBB introduced a new grading system in 2009, the organization received criticism because companies that paid for accreditation were consistently graded higher than their unaccredited counterparts. Criticism peaked following a 2010 ABC News 20/20 investigation that reported that fabricated companies—including one named “Hamas”—received high ratings shortly after paying membership fees, suggesting pay-for-play dynamics. Soon after, the organization announced it would stop giving better grades to paying members. Complaints were also made about the disproportionate compensation for some executives at the nonprofit. The head executive at the Southland chapter, for instance, had a salary of over $400,000 per year, which was higher than the organization's national president. He resigned in April 2011.

In 2012, the IABBB stripped trademark authorization from four Canadian chapters—Hamilton, Windsor, Montreal, and St. John's—citing failure to meet operational and reporting standards. These offices either rebranded or were absorbed into regional offices.

In 2013, the BBB’s largest affiliate—the Southland chapter—was expelled by the national council for failing to meet accreditation, reporting, and complaint-handling standards. Critics assert the BBB lacks objective oversight, given its board composition and financial ties to accredited companies.

A 2015 investigation by CNN found that some local bureaus used third-party call centers owned by former BBB executives to pressure businesses into paying for accreditation.

In June 2024, the IABBB expelled its Ottawa-based affiliate for "not meeting BBB standards." A new BBB entity was created to replace the expelled bureau.

== See also ==
- Angie's List
- ConsumerAffairs
- ResellerRatings
- Sitejabber
- Trustpilot
