= Factory seconds =

New product sold for a discount because of minor imperfections

Factory seconds, also known as factory rejects or simply seconds, are retail items that, through minor fault of manufacture, are sold to the public for a reduced rate, rather than being discarded. The goods are often resold at this lower rate after failing the factory's quality inspection, being returned to the manufacturer's factory by the original retailer, or (less frequently) being returned to the retailer or wholesaler by the customer.

The amount of damage or fault in the manufacture that may constitute an item being resold as a second varies widely; in clothing, for example, it may simply refer to a single pulled thread or mis-sewn seam, whereas in a set of items (such as crockery) it may mean there is one piece missing from the set. Other items can be slightly imperfect, reusable eco-friendly items that can be picked up, preventing them from ending up in a landfill. Generally, an item listed as a factory second will have failed quality inspection for cosmetic, rather than functional, reasons. Such items are often heavily discounted but may not have as all-encompassing a warranty or guarantee as a full-quality item (for example, the product may be non-returnable). Discount stores often rely on the sale of factory seconds as a major part of their trade.

== See also ==
- Refurbishment (electronics)
