= LegitScript =

American payments compliance company

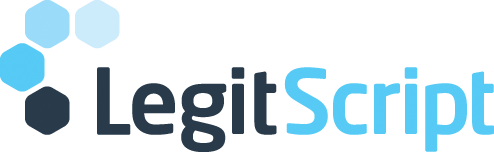
- Type: Private
- Industry: Internet compliance, payments compliance, Cybercrime investigation
- Founded: 2007
- Founder: John Horton
- Headquarters: Portland, Oregon, United States
- Area served: Worldwide
- Key people: Scott Roth (CEO)
- Products: Merchant monitoring, platform monitoring, certification, brand monitoring
- Website: www.legitscript.com

LegitScript is a Portland, Oregon-based internet and payments compliance company that provides services for merchant monitoring, platform monitoring, and certification in high-risk industries. The company also performs investigative analyses for government agencies around the world regarding cybercrime, and offers brand monitoring for intellectual property infringement. Some of LegitScript's partners include Google, Facebook, Amazon, Bing, and Visa. LegitScript also works with the U.S. Food and Drug Administration to monitor and investigate websites marketing FDA-regulated products.

LegitScript has been designated as a Top Workplace in Oregon multiple times in recent years and in 2019 was named to the Inc. 5000 list of most successful companies.

== Founding ==
LegitScript's founder and former CEO is John Horton, who was a White House aide on drug policy issues from 2002 to 2007. Scott Roth is the company's current CEO.

The company is a founding member of the Alliance for Safe Online Pharmacies. The NABP has written that it endorses LegitScript on behalf of the government agencies that license and regulate pharmacies and pharmacists in the United States, Canada, and other jurisdictions for use "by search engine advertising programs, Domain Name Registrars, registries, payment processing companies, social media companies, and other Internet platforms to ensure that Internet platforms operate in compliance with applicable healthcare laws and regulations, and are not utilized in furtherance of the illicit sale of unregulated healthcare products". In addition, some EU government agencies have referred to LegitScript as the "appropriate authority" to which rogue Internet pharmacies should be reported.

Although LegitScript began its monitoring primarily in the online pharmacy and dietary supplement spaces, the company has since expanded into other high-risk areas, including transaction laundering, gambling, illicit adult content, scams and fraud, cannabidiol (CBD), content that advocates for hate or violence, and more.

== Domain name registrars ==
In November 2008, LegitScript launched its registrar notification program and reported that it had shut down 500 "rogue" Internet pharmacies by notifying their ISPs and domain name registrars. In May 2010, the company released a report regarding over 7,000 websites displaying a forged pharmacy license, indicating that it worked with 11 different domain name registrars to shut down the websites. In late 2012, the company stated that it had worked with registrars to shut down over 35,000 rogue Internet pharmacy websites in the previous four years.

As of early 2013, several domain name registrars explicitly state in their terms of services that they suspend and lock domain names identified as rogue Internet pharmacies by LegitScript, and outsource their abuse point-of-contact on Internet pharmacy issues to LegitScript. The company has stated that it works with most domain name registrars, and, in late 2012, it began publishing data showing that the websites of rogue Internet pharmacies "cluster" around a small number of registrars that LegitScript says ignore abuse notifications. Several Internet pharmacy affiliate marketers have publicly discussed the importance of registering Internet pharmacy domain names with registrars that do not work with LegitScript. In submitting abuse notifications to ICANN-accredited registrars, LegitScript has authority to act on the behalf of government regulators in some countries, such as Japan.

== Consumer protection ==
In March 2010, consumer protection website SiteJabber announced that it would begin integrating LegitScript's legitimacy determinations into its Internet pharmacy ratings. In May 2010, the WOT Services announced a similar initiative in which LegitScript Internet pharmacy legitimacy determinations would be integrated into its reputation rankings.

== Dietary supplements and designer drugs ==
LegitScript maintains a Healthcare Product Legitimacy program that monitors whether "dietary supplements have been the subject of regulatory action, are considered unsafe, or are marketed as miracle cures" and that is also endorsed by the National Association of Boards of Pharmacy. In its advertising policies for healthcare and medicines, Google indicates that it uses LegitScript's healthcare product legitimacy program to determine which supplements and designer drugs should be restricted from advertising.

== Anti-trust lawsuit ==
Legitscript is the subject of an antitrust action by pharmacychecker.com, a website which provides and compares prices of drugs from licensed international pharmacies, and verifies the credentials of these pharmacies. Pharmacychecker.com alleges that Legitscript is engaged in a conspiracy to suppress the information it provides. U.S. District Judge Michael H. Simon ruled on January 3 2023 denying a motion by LegitScript for a summary judgment for a stay of discovery in the lawsuit, as well as affirming Pharmacychecker.com as a legitimate enterprise.

== International Internet pharmacy certification ==
As of February 2013, LegitScript's website indicated that it had approved over 250 online pharmacy websites and documented over 48,000 "rogue" online pharmacy websites. The program is also endorsed by the National Association of Boards of Pharmacy.
