= FortSP =

Software package

- Developer: OptiRisk Systems
- Platform: Cross-platform
- Type: Operations Research Tool, Numerical Software
- License: Proprietary
- Website: optirisk-systems.com/products/solver-systems/fortsp/

FortSP is a software package for solving stochastic programming (SP) problems. It solves scenario-based SP problems with recourse as well as problems with chance constraints and integrated chance constraints. FortSP is available as a standalone executable that accepts input in SMPS format and as a library with an interface in the C programming language.

The solution algorithms provided by FortSP include Benders' decomposition and a variant of level decomposition for two-stage problems, nested Benders' decomposition for multistage problems and reformulation of the problem as a deterministic equivalent. There is also an implementation of a cutting-plane algorithm for integrated chance constraints.

FortSP supports external linear programming solvers such as CPLEX and FortMP through their library interfaces or nl files. These solvers are used to optimize the deterministic equivalent problem and also the subproblems in the decomposition methods.
