= SmartCustomer =

Online review platform

- Type: Privately held
- Industry: Business ratings and online reviews
- Founded: 2006
- Founders: Michael Lai; Jeremy Gin; Rodney Gin
- Headquarters: Redwood City, California
- Products: Online review platform
- Website: www.smartcustomer.com

SmartCustomer, formerly Sitejabber, is a platform that allows businesses and buyers to interact through online reviews. It was founded in 2006 in San Francisco, California and has been described as "the Yelp for websites and online businesses".

== History ==
The service was started in 2006 by Jeremy Gin, Rodney Gin and Michael Lai in an effort to reduce online fraud and improve online transparency. Sitejabber was originally developed with a grant from the National Science Foundation.

In 2010, Sitejabber partnered with LegitScript to identify fraudulent prescription drug websites and help users avoid them. Sitejabber also formed a similar partnership with Health On Net (HON) to help identify trustworthy health and medical websites.

The company released an official Google Chrome extension in 2015.

In 2024, the Federal Trade Commission (FTC) alleged that Sitejabber misrepresented initial shopping experience feedback as reviews of actual products or services, and issued an order prohibiting the company from doing so in the future.

Their services have been covered in publications such The New York Times, MarketWatch, MSN Money, The Atlantic, The Wall Street Journal, and The Chicago Tribune.

The company is a certified Google Reviews partner.

In March 2025, the company launched a brand discovery platform under the name SmartCustomer by Sitejabber.

The company was renamed as SmartCustomer in March 2026.

== Overview ==
The company's review management platform, which is now called SmartCustomer for Business, allows businesses to source reviews, manage feedback, and use reviews for their online marketing – including publishing or facilitating reviews across destinations including Google Seller Ratings, BBB, and other customer review websites.

In addition, both B2C and B2B consumers create accounts to rate and review online businesses, providing an overall star-rating, as well as evaluating criteria such as service, value, shipping, returns, and quality. It is a platform where users can share their experiences and insights about various businesses. These features are designed to help buyers make informed purchasing decisions while helping them avoid deceptive websites.

SmartCustomer has been recognized by PC Magazine and CNN.
