= Warren B. Powell =

American operations researcher and academic

- Education: Princeton University B.S 1977; Massachusetts Institute of Technology MSE & PhD 1981
- Known for: stochastic optimization, Operations research
- Scientific career
- Workplaces: Princeton University

Warren B. Powell is an American operations researcher and academic whose work focuses on stochastic optimization with applications to transportation, logistics, and energy systems modeling.

These works led him into research in methodologies for making decisions under uncertainty, spanning approximate dynamic programming, optimal learning, and general models and algorithms for sequential decision problems.

Powell joined Princeton University in 1981 and became professor emeritus in 2020 after nearly four decades on the faculty. He founded the Computational and Stochastic Optimization and Learning (CASTLE) Laboratory in 1990 and contributed to the development of Princeton's programs in operations research and engineering and management systems.

He founded the CASTLE Laboratory in 1990. His work focuses on development of a modeling framework for sequential decision analytics, which has been applied to the design and control of various processes. He was elected to the 2004 class of Fellows of the Institute for Operations Research and the Management Sciences.

Powell is a Fellow of the Institute for Operations Research and the Management Sciences (INFORMS) and has received the Daniel H. Wagner Prize, the Robert Herman Lifetime Achievement Award, and the Saul Gass Expository Writing Award.

== Early life and Education ==
Powell earned his Bachelor of Science in Engineering from Princeton University in 1977, with a focus on transportation systems. He went on to pursue graduate studies at the Massachusetts Institute of Technology (MIT), where he earned his MSE and Ph.D. at the intersection of transportation and operations research.

== Career ==
Powell returned to Princeton in 1981 as a faculty member in civil engineering. His early research focused on transportation systems and stochastic models, particularly problems arising in freight transportation. Princeton's later development of programs in operations research and financial engineering provided a broader institutional setting for this work. Powell also directed the Certificate Program in Engineering and Management Systems.

=== CASTLE Laboratory ===
In 1990, Powell founded the Computational and Stochastic Transportation and Logistics Engineering Laboratory at Princeton, known as CASTLE Labs. The laboratory initially focused on computational methods for stochastic optimization in transportation and logistics and subsequently expanded into other areas involving decision-making under uncertainty.

Research associated with the laboratory addressed problems including freight transportation, locomotive management, vehicle routing and scheduling, military airlift, spare-parts management, supply-chain planning, energy systems, and other resource-allocation problems. The laboratory provided a setting in which mathematical models and algorithms could be developed in collaboration with organizations facing large-scale operational planning problems

=== Industrial collaborations ===
His later industrial collaborations included projects with Norfolk Southern Railway, UPS, NetJets, Embraer, and the U.S. Air Mobility Command. In the energy sector, Powell worked with PJM Interconnection and PSE&G to apply stochastic optimization methods to energy systems planning, which led to the formalization of a new class of stochastic optimization algorithms called “cost function approximations” based on the idea of parametrically modified deterministic approximations.

Powell has co-founded three companies over his career. In 1988, he established Princeton Transportation Consulting Group, which was later acquired by Manhattan Associates. In 1995, he co-founded Transport Dynamics.

He is also a co-founder of Optimal Dynamics, a technology startup launched in 2017, that licensed one of his software platforms for truckload freight optimization; the company, led by his son Daniel Powell, recently completed its Series C funding round, raising over $90 million. He helped develop Princeton's operations-research program and subsequently became a member of the Department of Operations Research and Financial Engineering.

Powell's work span both theoretical and practical aspects of operations research, with a particular focus on connecting academic insights to real-world industrial applications. His work in educational outreach include creating publicly accessible resources, instructional videos, and textbooks that aim to simplify complex topics in decision analytics. He served on the board of directors of INFORMS, was president of the Society for Transportation Science and Logistics, and chaired the 2016 INFORMS Optimization Society conference. In 1991, he co-founded the TRISTAN (Triennial Symposium on Transportation Analysis) conference, and in 2004, he contributed to the establishment of the INFORMS Impact Prize.

=== Transportation and logistics ===
During the 1980s, Powell and his collaborators developed models for less-than-truckload and truckload transportation. Among these was SuperSPIN, a planning system developed for less-than-truckload trucking that would be adopted by almost the entire LTL industry. He also developed MicroMAP for performing real-time dispatching for truckload carriers; MicroMAP was still in use 30 years later. His work in truckload fleet management laid the foundation for his work in stochastic optimization and sequential decision problems that dominated the rest of his career.

Powell's research also extended to railroad operations which he started in the 1990s. His work on locomotive planning applied approximate dynamic programming to the allocation and positioning of locomotives. A resulting optimization system was implemented by Norfolk Southern Railway in 2008, and established the architecture for the system he developed for fleet planning at Schneider National; this system which was the foundation of Optimal Dynamics.

== Research ==
Powell is a researcher in approximate dynamic programming (ADP) and sequential decision analytics, focusing on algorithms and frameworks for high-dimensional stochastic optimization problems.

He introduced a unified framework for modeling sequential decision problems and identified four fundamental classes of decision policies that include any method for making decisions over time. These frameworks are detailed in his 2022 book Reinforcement Learning and Stochastic Optimization: A unified framework for sequential decisions, which synthesizes 15 subfields under a standard methodology.

Powell co-developed the knowledge gradient method for sequential learning problems, in collaboration with Peter Frazier. The method has been the subject of multiple dissertations and is described in the book Optimal Learning with Ilya Ryzhov. In 2025 this work won the “Test of Time” Award from the Informs Journal on Computing, which published the critical paper on the knowledge gradient for correlated beliefs.

He contributed to the development of a stochastic optimization model for managing large-scale truckload carrier fleets, in collaboration with Hugo Simao. This model later became the basis for the company Optimal Dynamics, which received the Daniel Wagner Prize. He also led the development of an optimization model for locomotive planning in U.S. freight railroads, implemented in 2008 at Norfolk Southern, where it remained in use as of 2025.

In the late 1980s, he developed a load-matching system for truckload trucking, MicroMAP, which used an early form of approximate dynamic programming to estimate the future value of drivers. MicroMAP was marketed by Princeton Transportation Consulting Group and later by Manhattan Associates.

== Honors and awards ==
- 2022 Saul Gass Expository Writing Award
- 2021 The Robert Herman Lifetime Achievement Award
- 2013 Docteur honoris causa by the University of Quebec at Montreal.
- Winner, 2009 Daniel H. Wagner Prize for Excellence in Operations Research Practice.
- Informs Fellow Award, 2004.

== Selected publications ==
=== Books ===
- Powell, Warren B. (2022). Reinforcement Learning and Stochastic Optimization. doi:10.1002/9781119815068. ISBN 978-1-119-81503-7.
- Powell, Warren B. (2022). "Sequential Decision Analytics and Modeling: Modeling with Python - Part II". Foundations and Trends® in Technology, Information and Operations Management. 16 (1–2): 1–176. doi:10.1561/0200000103-II.
- Powell, Warren B. (2012). Optimal Learning. Wiley Series in Probability and Statistics. doi:10.1002/9781118309858. ISBN 978-0-470-59669-2.
- Approximate Dynamic Programming. Wiley Series in Probability and Statistics. 2007. doi:10.1002/9780470182963. ISBN 978-0-470-17155-4.
- Powell, Warren B. (2024). A Modern Approach to Teaching an Introduction to Optimization. doi:10.1561/9781638283218. ISBN 978-1-63828-320-1.

=== Journals ===
- Powell, Warren B. (2019). "A unified framework for stochastic optimization". European Journal of Operational Research. 275 (3): 795–821. doi:10.1016/j.ejor.2018.07.014.
- Frazier, Peter I.; Powell, Warren B.; Dayanik, Savas (2008). "A Knowledge-Gradient Policy for Sequential Information Collection". SIAM Journal on Control and Optimization. 47 (5): 2410–2439. Bibcode:2008SJCO...47.2410F. doi:10.1137/070693424.
- Frazier, Peter; Powell, Warren; Dayanik, Savas (2009). "The Knowledge-Gradient Policy for Correlated Normal Beliefs". Informs Journal on Computing. 21 (4): 599–613. doi:10.1287/ijoc.1080.0314.
- Ryzhov, Ilya O.; Powell, Warren B.; Frazier, Peter I. (2012). "The Knowledge Gradient Algorithm for a General Class of Online Learning Problems". Operations Research. 60 (1): 180–195. doi:10.1287/opre.1110.0999.
- Powell, Warren B.; Jaillet, Patrick; Odoni, Amedeo (1995). "Chapter 3 Stochastic and dynamic networks and routing". Network Routing. Handbooks in Operations Research and Management Science. Vol. 8. pp. 141–295. doi:10.1016/s0927-0507(05)80107-0. ISBN 978-0-444-82141-6.
- Godfrey, Gregory A.; Powell, Warren B. (2002). "An Adaptive Dynamic Programming Algorithm for Dynamic Fleet Management, I: Single Period Travel Times". Transportation Science. 36: 21–39. doi:10.1287/trsc.36.1.21.570.
- Sheffi, Yosef; Powell, Warren B. (1982). "An algorithm for the equilibrium assignment problem with random link times". Networks. 12 (2): 191–207. doi:10.1002/net.3230120209.
