= Refurbishment =

Refurbishment may refer to:

- Refurbishment (electronics), restoration and testing of pre-owned electronic devices
- Sustainable refurbishment, modification of existing buildings to improve environmental performance
- Antiques restoration
- Automotive restoration

== See also ==
- Conservation and restoration of immovable cultural property
- Reconstruction (architecture)
- Remanufacturing
- Renovation
