= Remanufacturing =

Concept in design and manufacturing

Remanufacturing is "the rebuilding of a product to specifications of the original manufactured product using a combination of reused, repaired and new parts". It requires the repair or replacement of worn out or obsolete components and modules. Parts subject to degradation affecting the performance or the expected life of the whole are replaced. Remanufacturing is a form of a product recovery process that differs from other recovery processes in its completeness: a remanufactured machine should match the same customer expectation as new machines.

In 1995, the United States Environmental Protection Agency (EPA) implemented the Comprehensive Procurement Guideline (CPG) program to promote waste reduction and resource conservation through the use of materials recovered from solid waste, and to ensure that the materials collected in recycling programs will be used again in the manufacture of new products. The EPA is required to designate products that are or can be made with recovered materials, and to recommend practices for buying these products. Once a product is designated, state and federal procuring agencies are required to purchase it with the highest recovered material content level practicable.

In 2004, the EPA published its third CPG update (CPG IV) which designated seven additional products and revised three existing product designations. One of the new product categories to be added was Rebuilt Vehicular Parts. The EPA defines rebuilt vehicular parts as "vehicle parts that have been re-manufactured, reusing parts in their original form. Rebuilt parts undergo an extensive re-manufacturing and testing process and must meet the same industry specifications for performance as new parts."

In the UK, a market potential of up to 5.6 billion GBP has been identified in remanufacturing, with the benefits said to be improvement to business margins, revenues and security of supply. The United States remanufacturing industry grew by 15% between 2009 and 2011, and in 2020 it accounted for 2% of all manufacturing in the US and 1.9% in the European Union.

== Definition ==
Many formal definitions of remanufacturing exist in the literature, but the first published report on remanufacturing, by R. Lund (1984), describes remanufacturing as "... an industrial process in which worn-out products are restored to like-new condition. Through a series of industrial processes in a factory environment, a discarded product is completely disassembled. Useable parts are cleaned, refurbished, and put into inventory. Then the product is reassembled from the old parts (and where necessary, new parts) to produce a unit fully equivalent and sometimes superior in performance and expected lifetime to the original new product".

Furthermore, the Automotive Parts Remanufacturers Association (APRA) realized that communication problems can arise when people from different countries with different language skills talk about remanufacturing. Certain terms can have different meanings as definitions between countries and individuals vary. In 2013, APRA was able to solve these communication problems by publishing a common translation list in many different languages in order to unite all those who deal with the automotive industry.

=== Rebuilding ===
Rebuilding is an old name for remanufacturing. It is still widely used by automotive industry. For example, the Automotive Parts Remanufacturers Association (APRA), have the new term in their name, but to be safe on their own website use the combined term 'rebuild/remanufacture'.

The term 'rebuilding' is also often used by railway companies; a steam locomotive may be rebuilt with a new boiler or a diesel locomotive may be rebuilt with a new engine. This saves money (by re-using the frame, and some other components, which still have years of useful life) and allows the incorporation of improved technology. For example, a new diesel engine may have lower fuel consumption, reduced exhaust emissions and better reliability. Recent examples include British Rail Class 57 and British Rail Class 43.

== Types of remanufacturing ==
There are three main types of remanufacturing activities, each with different operational challenges.

1. Remanufacturing without identity loss With this method, a current machine is built on yesterday's base, receiving all enhancements, expected life and warranty of a new machine. The physical structure (the chassis or frame) is inspected for soundness. The whole product is refurbished and critical modules are overhauled, upgraded or replaced. Any defects in the original design are eliminated. This is the case for customized remanufacturing of machine tools, airplanes, computer mainframes, large medical equipment and other capital goods. Because of its uniqueness, this product recovery is characterized as a project.

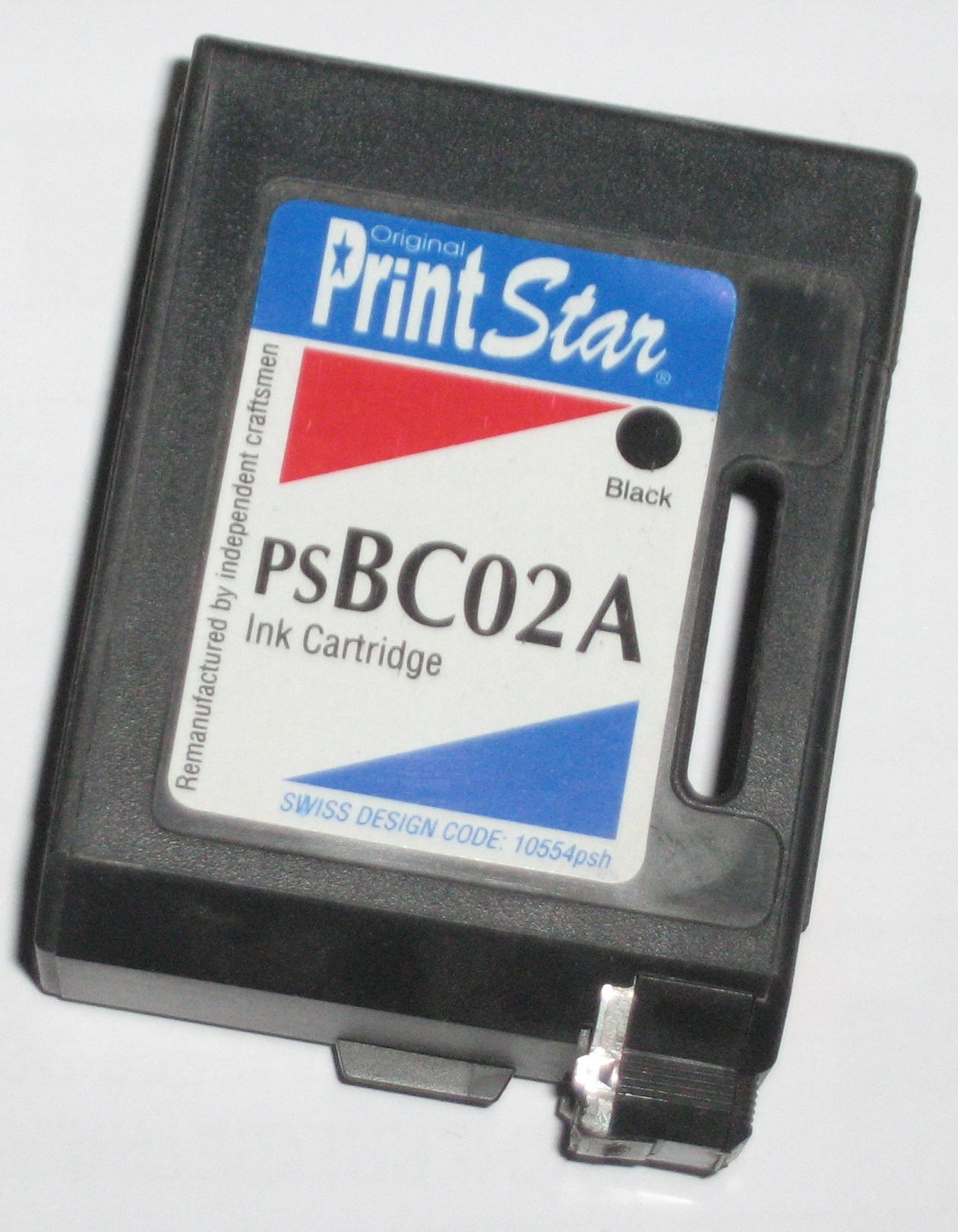
Canon cartridge for inkjet printers, remanufactured under «PrintStar» brand

1. Remanufacturing with loss of original product identity With this method, used goods are disassembled into pre-determined components and repaired to stock, ready to be reassembled into a remanufactured product. This is the case when remanufacturing automobile components, photocopiers, toner and ink cartridges, furniture, ready-to-use cameras and personal computers. Once the product is disassembled and the parts are recovered, the process concludes with an operation similar to original manufacturing. Disassembled parts are inventoried, just like purchased parts and made available for final assembly. Remanufacturing with loss of original product identity encompasses some unique challenges in inventory management and disassembly sequence development. Some of the open questions relate to the commonality of parts in products of different generations, the uncertainty in the supply of used products, and their relationship with production planning. The National Center for Remanufacturing and Resource Recovery (C3R) at Rochester Institute of Technology is researching remanufacturing processes including testing standards for remanufactured products.
2. Repetitive remanufacturing without identity loss In this method, there is the additional challenge of scheduling the sequence of dependent processes and identifying the location of inventory buffers. There is a fine line between repetitive remanufacturing without loss of identity and product overhaul. The final output has an as-new appearance and is covered by a warranty comparable to that of a new product.

Remanufacturing by Recoating of Worn Engine Parts

In addition to these is a less significant type of remanufacturing, remanufacturing by recoating of worn engine parts. This type of remanufacturing serves many engine parts and other large and expensive components that become worn after a period of use. An example is the engine block, in particular the cylinder engine bores, which must withstand combustion. Instead of disposing of engine blocks, remanufacturing enables re-use by coating them with plasma transferred wire arc spraying (PTWA). Remanufacturing by recoating of parts is also popular in aviation and with geothermal pipe.

== See also ==
- Cannibalization (parts)
- Conservation and restoration of rail vehicles
- Reuse implies that items are used by a second customer without prior repair operations or as originally designed.
- Repair: the process of bringing damaged components back to a functional condition.
- Refurbishing: the process of restoring components to a functional and/or satisfactory state to the original specification, using methods such as resurfacing, repainting, etc.
- Recycling: the process of taking a component material and processing it to make the same material or useful degraded material.
- Reverse logistics network modelling
- Right to repair
