= Arunava Sen =

Indian researcher and teacher

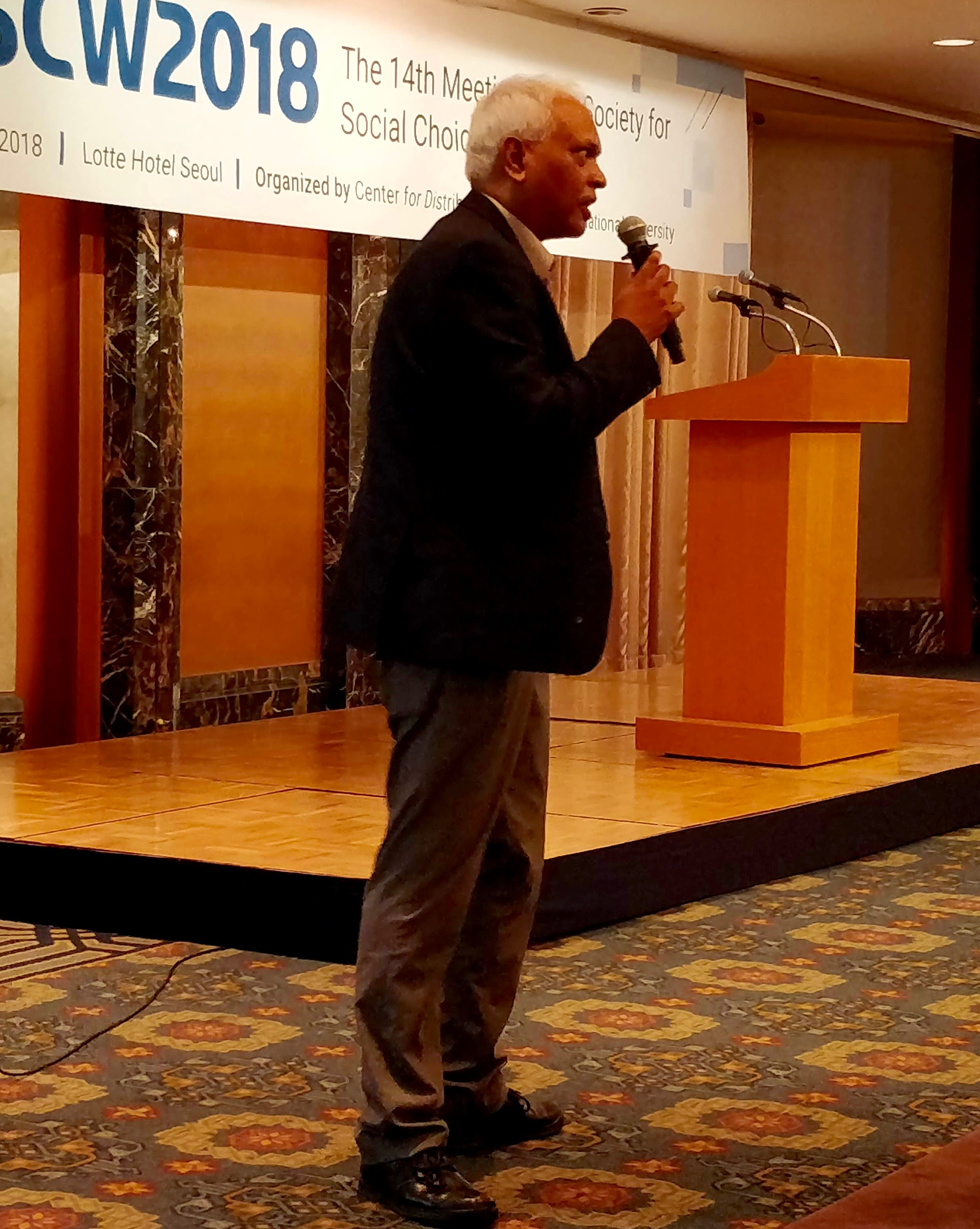
- Sen delivering a lecture at the Seoul meeting of the Society for Social Choice and Welfare
- Born: 3 January 1959 (age 67); Bombay

Academic background
- Education: University of Delhi (B.A., M.A.); Oxford University (M.Phil.); Princeton University (PhD)
- Doctoral advisor: Hugo F. Sonnenschein

Academic work
- Discipline: Game Theory, Social Choice Theory, Mechanism Design, Auctions
- Institutions: Indian Statistical Institute
- Website: https://www.isid.ac.in/~asen/index.html

Arunava Sen (born 3 January 1959) is a professor of economics at the Indian Statistical Institute. He works on Game Theory, Social Choice Theory, Mechanism Design, Voting and Auctions.

== Early life ==
Arunava Sen was born in Bombay (currently, Mumbai) on 3 January 1959. Soon after he was born, his parents moved to Delhi, where he attended the St. Columba's School. In 1970, the family moved to the Chittaranjan Park neighbourhood in South Delhi, where he still lives.

== Education ==
Arunava Sen received a B.A. degree in economics from St. Stephen's College, New Delhi, in 1978, and an M.A. degree in economics from Delhi School of Economics in 1980. He then went to Oxford University on an Inlaks scholarship where he received an M.Phil. in 1982. He was tutored and advised by Sir James Mirlees at Oxford University. Then, he joined the Princeton University for his Ph.D. and worked on the theory of implementation under the supervision of Hugo Sonnenschein. He received his Ph.D. in 1987. Besides his advisor Hugo Sonnenschein, other members in his Ph.D. dissertation committee included Andrew Caplin and Joseph Stiglitz.

== Career and research contributions ==
Arunava Sen joined the Delhi center of Indian Statistical Institute immediately after his Ph.D. in 1987 and has been with the institute since then. He is currently a professor at the Economics and Planning Unit of the institute. He is most well known for his contribution to the implementation theory and mechanism design. These subfields of game theory is concerned with the design of mechanisms or institutions that produce socially desirable outcomes in equilibrium. The 2007 Nobel prize in Economics was awarded to Leonid Hurwicz, Eric Maskin, and Roger Myerson for their contribution to the theory of mechanism design and implementation theory. The scientific background document of the Nobel prize cites Arunava Sen's work with his coauthor Dilip Abreu.

=== Implementation theory ===
The implementation theory is widely regarded as the reverse engineering of game theory. It is concerned with the design of a game (or game-form) such that every equilibrium outcome of the game produces the desired outcome (modeled as a social choice rule) of the designer. The notion of equilibrium or the solution concept allows flexibility in designing games. In his Nobel prize winning work, Eric Maskin investigates implementation using Nash equilibrium as the solution concept. Maskin shows that any Nash implementable social choice rule must satisfy a monotonicity property, which is now called Maskin monotonicity. Conversely, every social choice rule which is Maskin monotone and satisfies a mild property, called no veto power, can be implemented in Nash equilibrium. This started a large literature in implementation theory. Arunava Sen, along with his coauthors, has contributed to this literature by extending Maskin's results in various directions.

Maskin's result requires that there are at least three agents who will play the designed game. In his work with Bhaskar Dutta, Arunava Sen extends Maskin's result when there are only two agents. In his work with Dilip Abreu, they introduce a new implementation framework. In their model, a social choice rule produces a lottery over a finite set of outcomes at every profile of preferences. The equilibrium outcome lottery of the designed game need not coincide with the social choice rule outcome, but they have to be arbitrarily close. They call this virtual implementation and show that virtual implementation using Nash equilibrium as the solution concept is quite permissive. In another joint work with Dilip Abreu, Arunava Sen investigates implementation where a designer can design extensive form games. They describe the social choice rules that can be implemented in subgame perfect equilibrium. Their result extends the work of Moore and Repullo.

In his work with Bhaskar Dutta, Arunava Sen studies a new model of implementation, where agents (playing the game) can be partially honest. In their model, an agent is partially honest if she strictly prefers telling the truth whenever she is indifferent between telling the truth and lying. This paper revisits Maskin's seminal paper in this new model and presents several new insights. They show that if there is at least one partially honest agent (out of at least three agents), then every social choice rule satisfying no veto power can be implemented in Nash equilibrium. Thus, Maskin monotonicity is no longer a necessary condition in this model.

In his work with Saptarshi Mukherjee (one of his Ph.D. students), Nozumo Muto, and Eve Raemakers, Arunava Sen studies implementation in undominated strategies using bounded mechanisms. They show that the Pareto correspondence is implementable in undominated strategies using bounded mechanisms. This answers an open question in the literature posed by Tilman Börgers. The work is also important because implementation in undominated strategies has been criticised for using unbounded mechanisms to establish various results, and their work provides a general positive result on implementation using bounded mechanisms and undominated strategies.

=== Strategic voting theory ===
Arunava Sen has done fundamental contributions to the theory of strategic voting. The starting point of this theory is an impossibility result due to Gibbard and Satterthwaite: the Gibbard-Satterthwaite (GS) impossibility theorem and Gibbard's theorem. Roughly, it states that there is no voting rule which is unanimous, non-dictatorial, and non-manipulable (strategyproof) if the preferences of voters are unrestricted. Arunava Sen's work in this area identifies environments where such theorems hold or well-behaved voting rules exist. In his work with his coauthors Navin Aswal and Shurojit Chatterji, he provides a comprehensive description of environments where GS theorem holds. In his works and with coauthors Shurojit Chatterji, Huaxia Zeng, and Remzi Sanver, he identifies environments where GS theorem does not hold, i.e., well-behaved voting rules exist. In his work with coauthors Shurojit Chatterji and Huaxia Zeng, he has identified environments where the GS theorem type result continues to hold even if the voting rule allows for randomization (which generalizes Gibbard's theorem).

In his work with his coauthor (and Ph.D. student) Dipjyoti Majumdar, he weakens the notion of non-manipulability in the GS theorem to Ordinal Bayesian Incentive Compatibility, first studied in an important paper by Claude d'Aspremont and Gerard Varet. Arunava's work with Dipjyoti Majumdar shows that whether well-behaved voting rules exist with this weakening of non-manipulability depends on the beliefs of the voters on other voters' preferences. If beliefs are uniformly distributed, then many well-behaved voting rules exist and they provide a comprehensive description of such voting rules. However, if voters have generic beliefs (which are independent), a GS theorem type impossibility reappears. In a follow up work with Mohit Bhargava and Dipjyoti Majumdar, he shows that if voters beliefs are correlated, then it is possible to escape the impossibility of the GS theorem using this weaker notion of incentive compatibility.

In his work with his coauthor Michel Le Breton, he studies a voting environment where voters vote on various dimensions but preferences of voters are separable across dimensions. Their work identifies conditions on environments such that every unanimous and non-manipulable (strategyproof) voting rule can be decomposed along each dimension. He has pursued this line of research in some of his other work. In his work with Bhaskar Dutta and Hans Peters, he shows that considering cardinal voting schemes does not allow one to escape the consequences of GS impossibility theorem.

=== Mechanism design with transfers ===
Arunava Sen has done fundamental contributions to the theory of mechanism design where transfers are used for incentives, e.g., auction design. In mechanism design, incentive compatibility is often characterized by (equivalent to) some form of monotonicity condition. In his seminal work on revenue-maximizing single object auctions, Roger Myerson provides such a monotonicity condition. In his work with Sushil Bikhchandani, Shurojit Chatterji, Ron Lavi, Ahuva Mualem, and Noam Nisan, Arunava Sen provides an analogue of this monotonicity condition which works in a variety of problems, including multi-object auctions and provision of multiple public goods. This work is regarded as a fundamental contribution to the multidimensional mechanism design literature, where private information of agents have multiple dimensions. In his works and with Debasis Mishra and Swaprava Nath, he has described the set of all strategyproof mechanisms in mechanism design settings which permit transfers. These contributions extend a seminal characterization of strategyproof mechanisms in these settings due to Kevin W. S. Roberts.

=== Simpler proofs of important theorems in mechanism design ===
Arunava Sen has provided simple proofs of three important theorems in mechanism design. In his work, he uses induction on the number of agents to provide a simple proof of the Gibbard-Satterthwaite (GS) theorem. The induction technique in proving the GS theorem is quite easily extendible to other settings where such theorems hold. For instance, in his work with Dipjyoti Majumdar, he uses similar induction techniques to prove an analogue of the GS theorem using a weaker notion of incentive compatibility. He uses the induction technique to prove a simpler version of Gibbard's theorem in his work. In his work with Debasis Mishra, he provides a simpler proof of an important theorem, due to Kevin W. S. Roberts, which characterizes the set of strategyproof mechanisms in mechanism design problems with transfers. This proof uses ideas from social choice theory, particularly in.

In general, Arunava Sen's works tend to connect different branches of mechanism design theory and social choice theory to establish elegant results in different areas of economic theory. A prime example of such a work is with Mridu Prabal Goswami. In this work, they use ideas from Myerson's single object auction design to prove a dictatorship result in an exchange economy setting, a problem which was first studied by Leonid Hurwicz.

His contributions have been published in journals like Econometrica, Review of Economic Studies, Theoretical Economics, Journal of Economic Theory, Games and Economic Behavior and Social Choice and Welfare among others.

== Student supervision and teaching ==
Arunava Sen enjoys supervising Ph.D. and Masters students. He is known for being extremely generous with his time when it comes to mentoring students. Till 2015, he had advised nine Ph.D. students at Indian Statistical Institute, and all of them hold academic positions in various universities and institutes. He also routinely advises Masters and senior undergraduate students in their thesis work.

Arunava Sen is a popular teacher at Indian Statistical Institute. He has taught various courses on economic theory, including Game Theory, Social Choice Theory, Microeconomics. He is famous for never bringing a single line of note or paper to his classes and teaching on blackboard with impeccable accuracy without any immediate reference.

== Awards and honors ==
Arunava Sen is President Elect of the Society for Social Choice and Welfare, Fellow of the Econometric Society and an Economic Theory Fellow. He has been awarded the Mahalanobis Memorial Medal of the Indian Econometric Society for his contribution to Economics. He is a recipient of the 2012 Infosys Prize in the Social Sciences category for his work on "game-theoretic analyses of mechanism design for implementing social choice rules, when individuals have diverse information and incentives". In 2017, he received the TWAS-Siwei Cheng Prize for his " theoretical work on the collective, strategic behavior of people trying to get what they want from rule-based institutions". He also served on the Social Sciences jury for the Infosys Prize in 2014 and 2016.

== Personal life ==
Arunava Sen's mother Nihar Sen was a housewife and father Jyotirmoy Sen worked in civil aviation as an air crash investigator. He is the youngest of three children in the family.

Arunava Sen is married to Kavita Singh since 2000. Kavita Singh is a distinguished art historian and a professor of art history at Jawaharlal Nehru University in Delhi. Their son Aditya Sen was born in 2003. When Kavita Singh won the Infosys Prize in 2018, they became the second Indian couple to win the Infosys Prize in different fields.

== Other interests ==
Arunava Sen is an avid fan of Chess. His favorite chess player is Vishwanathan Anand. He likes solving online chess problems daily.

== Selected publications ==
A selection of articles authored by Arunava Sen based on Google Scholar citations are given below.

- Abreu, D. and Sen, A., 1990. Subgame perfect implementation: A necessary and almost sufficient condition. Journal of Economic theory, 50(2), pp. 285–299.
- Dutta, B. and Sen, A., 1991. Implementation under strong equilibrium: A complete characterization. Journal of Mathematical Economics, 20(1), pp. 49–67.
- Dutta, B. and Sen, A., 1991. A necessary and sufficient condition for two-person Nash implementation. The Review of Economic Studies, 58(1), pp. 121–128.
- Abreu, D. and Sen, A., 1991. Virtual implementation in Nash equilibrium. Econometrica: Journal of the Econometric Society, pp. 997–1021.
- Dutta, B., Sen, A. and Vohra, R., 1994. Nash implementation through elementary mechanisms in economic environments. Economic Design, 1(1), pp. 173–203.
- Dutta, B. and Sen, A., 1994. Bayesian implementation: the necessity of infinite mechanisms. Journal of Economic Theory, 64(1), pp. 130–141.
- Sen, A., 1995. The implementation of social choice functions via social choice correspondences: A general formulation and a limit result. Social Choice and Welfare, 12(3), pp. 277–292.
- Dutta, B. and Sen, A., 1996. Ranking opportunity sets and Arrow impossibility theorems: correspondence results. Journal of Economic Theory, 71(1), pp. 90–101.
- Bergin, J. and Sen, A., 1998. Extensive form implementation in incomplete information environments. Journal of Economic Theory, 80(2), pp. 222–256.
- Breton, M.L. and Sen, A., 1999. Separable preferences, strategyproofness, and decomposability. Econometrica, 67(3), pp. 605–628.
- Sen, A., 2001. Another direct proof of the Gibbard–Satterthwaite theorem. Economics Letters, 70(3), pp. 381–385.
- Aswal, N., Chatterji, S. and Sen, A., 2003. Dictatorial domains. Economic Theory, 22(1), pp. 45–62.
- Majumdar, D. and Sen, A., 2004. Ordinally Bayesian incentive compatible voting rules. Econometrica, 72(2), pp. 523–540.
- Bikhchandani, S., Chatterji, S., Lavi, R., Mu'alem, A., Nisan, N. and Sen, A., 2006. Weak monotonicity characterizes deterministic dominant-strategy implementation. Econometrica, 74(4), pp. 1109–1132.
- Dutta, B., Peters, H. and Sen, A., 2007. Strategy-proof cardinal decision schemes. Social Choice and Welfare, 28(1), pp. 163–179.
- Mitra, M. and Sen, A., 2010. Efficient allocation of heterogenous commodities with balanced transfers. Social Choice and Welfare, 35(1), pp. 29–48.
- Chatterji, S. and Sen, A., 2011. Tops-only domains. Economic Theory, 46(2), pp. 255–282.
- Dutta, B. and Sen, A., 2012. Nash implementation with partially honest individuals. Games and Economic Behavior, 74(1), pp. 154–169.
- Gravel, N., Marchant, T. and Sen, A., 2012. Uniform expected utility criteria for decision making under ignorance or objective ambiguity. Journal of Mathematical Psychology, 56(5), pp. 297–315.
- Mishra, D. and Sen, A., 2012. Robertsʼ Theorem with neutrality: A social welfare ordering approach. Games and Economic Behavior, 75(1), pp. 283–298.
- Chatterji, S., Sen, A. and Zeng, H., 2014. Random dictatorship domains. Games and Economic Behavior, 86, pp. 212–236.
- Goswami, M.P., Mitra, M. and Sen, A., 2014. Strategy proofness and Pareto efficiency in quasilinear exchange economies. Theoretical Economics, 9(2), pp. 361–381.
- Massó, J., Nicolo, A., Sen, A., Sharma, T. and Ülkü, L., 2015. On cost sharing in the provision of a binary and excludable public good. Journal of Economic Theory, 155, pp. 30–49.
- Chatterji, S., Sen, A. and Zeng, H., 2016. A characterization of single-peaked preferences via random social choice functions. Theoretical Economics, 11(2), pp. 711–733.
- Gravel, N., Marchant, T. and Sen, A., 2018. Conditional expected utility criteria for decision making under ignorance or objective ambiguity. Journal of Mathematical Economics, 78, pp. 79–95.
- Mukherjee, S., Muto, N., Ramaekers, E. and Sen, A., 2019. Implementation in undominated strategies by bounded mechanisms: The Pareto correspondence and a generalization. Journal of Economic Theory, 180, pp. 229–243.
