= Partial allocation mechanism =

The Partial Allocation Mechanism (PAM) is a mechanism for truthful resource allocation. It is based on the max-product allocation - the allocation maximizing the product of agents' utilities (also known as the Nash-optimal allocation or the Proportionally-Fair solution; in many cases it is equivalent to the competitive equilibrium from equal incomes). It guarantees to each agent at least 0.368 of his/her utility in the max-product allocation. It was designed by Cole, Gkatzelis and Goel.

== Setting ==
There are m resources that are assumed to be homogeneous and divisible.

There are n agents, each of whom has a personal function that attributes a numeric value to each "bundle" (combination of resources). The valuations are assumed to be homogeneous functions.

The goal is to decide what "bundle" to give to each agent, where a bundle may contain a fractional amount of each resource.

Crucially, some resources may have to be discarded, i.e., free disposal is assumed.

Monetary payments are not allowed.

== Algorithm ==
PAM works in the following way.

- Calculate the max-product allocation; denote it by z.
- For each agent i:
  - Calculate the max-product allocation when i is not present.
  - Let f_{i} = (the product of the other agents in z) / (the max-product of the other agents when i is not present).
  - Give to agent i a fraction f_{i} of each resource he gets in z.

== Properties ==
PAM has the following properties.

- It is a truthful mechanism - each agent's utility is maximized by revealing his/her true valuations.
- For each agent i, the utility of i is at least 1/e ≈ 0.368 of his/her utility in the max-product allocation.
- When the agents have additive linear valuations, the allocation is envy-free.

== PA vs VCG ==
The PA mechanism, which does not use payments, is analogous to the VCG mechanism, which uses monetary payments. VCG starts by selecting the max-sum allocation, and then for each agent i it calculates the max-sum allocation when i is not present, and pays i the difference (max-sum when i is present)-(max-sum when i is not present). Since the agents are quasilinear, the utility of i is reduced by an additive factor.

In contrast, PA does not use monetary payments, and the agents' utilities are reduced by a multiplicative factor, by taking away some of their resources.

== Optimality ==
It is not known whether the fraction of 0.368 is optimal. However, there is provably no truthful mechanism that can guarantee to each agent more than 0.5 of the max-product utility.

== Extensions ==
The PAM has been used as a subroutine in a truthful cardinal mechanism for one-sided matching.
