= Kavita Singh =

Kavita Singh may refer to:

- Kavita Singh (scholar), Indian scholar
- Kavita Singh (politician), Indian politician
