= Prior-independent mechanism =

A Prior-independent mechanism (PIM) is a mechanism in which the designer knows that the agents' valuations are drawn from some probability distribution, but does not know the distribution.

A typical application is a seller who wants to sell some items to potential buyers. The seller wants to price the items in a way that will maximize his profit. The optimal prices depend on the amount that each buyer is willing to pay for each item. The seller does not know these values, but he assumes that the values are random variables with some unknown probability distribution.

A PIM usually involves a random sampling process. The seller samples some valuations from the unknown distribution, and based on the samples, constructs an auction that yields approximately-optimal profits. The major research question in PIM design is: what is the sample complexity of the mechanism? I.e, how many agents it needs to sample in order to attain a reasonable approximation of the optimal welfare?

== Single-item auctions ==
The results in imply several bounds on the sample-complexity of revenue-maximization of single-item auctions:

- For a $1/4$-approximation of the optimal expected revenue, the sample-complexity is $1$ - a single sample suffices. This is true even when the bidders are not i.i.d.
- For a $1-\epsilon$-approximation of the optimal expected revenue, when the bidders are i.i.d OR when there is an unlimited supply of items (digital goods), the sample-complexity is $O(1/\epsilon^2)$ when the agents' distributions have monotone hazard rate, and $O(1/\epsilon^3)$ when the agents' distributions are regular but do not have monotone-hazard-rate.

The situation becomes more complicated when the agents are not i.i.d (each agent's value is drawn from a different regular distribution) and the goods have limited supply. When the agents come from $k$ different distributions, the sample complexity of $1-\epsilon$-approximation of the optimal expected revenue in single-item auctions is:

- at most $O({k^{10}\over \epsilon^7}\ln^3{k\over\epsilon})$ - using a variant of the empirical Myerson auction.
- at least $\Omega({k\over \sqrt{\epsilon\ln k}})$ (for monotone-hazard-rate regular valuations) and at least $\Omega({k\over \epsilon})$ (for arbitrary regular valuations).

== Single-parametric agents ==
discuss arbitrary auctions with single-parameter utility agents (not only single-item auctions), and arbitrary auction-mechanisms (not only specific auctions). Based on known results about sample complexity, they show that the number of samples required to approximate the maximum-revenue auction from a given class of auctions is:

$$O\bigg(({H\over \epsilon})^2(D \ln ({H\over \epsilon})+\ln({1\over\delta}))\bigg)$$

where:

- the agents' valuations are bounded in $[1,H]$,
- the pseudo-VC dimension of the class of auctions is at most $D$,
- the required approximation factor is $1-\epsilon$,
- the required success probability is $1-\delta$.

In particular, they consider a class of simple auctions called $t$-level auctions: auctions with $t$ reserve prices (a Vickrey auction with a single reserve price is a 1-level auction). They prove that the pseudo-VC-dimension of this class is $O(nt \ln (nt))$, which immediately translates to a bound on their generalization error and sample-complexity. They also prove bounds on the representation error of this class of auctions.

== Multi-parametric agents ==
Devanur et al study a market with different item types and unit demand agents.

Chawla et al study PIMs for the makespan minimization problem.

Hsu et al study a market with different item types. The supplies are fixed. The buyers can buy bundles of items, and have different valuations on bundles. They prove that, if $n$ buyers are sampled independently from some unknown distribution, an optimal price-vector is calculated, and this price-vector is then applied to a fresh sample of $n$ buyers, then the social welfare is approximately optimal. The competitive ratio implied by their Theorem 6.3 is, with probability $1-\delta$, at least

$1-O\bigg(\sqrt{h^3 n^{0.5} m^4 \ln^2 m \ln^2 {1\over \delta} \over \text{OptimalWelfare}}\bigg)$.

== Alternatives ==
Prior-independent mechanisms (PIM) should be contrasted with two other mechanism types:

- Bayesian-optimal mechanisms (BOM) assume that the agents' valuations are drawn from a known probability distribution. The mechanism is tailored to the parameters of this distribution (e.g., its median or mean value).
- Prior-free mechanisms (PFM) do not assume that the agents' valuations are drawn from any probability distribution (known or unknown). The seller's goal is to design an auction that will produce a reasonable profit even in worst-case scenarios.

From the point-of-view of the designer, BOM is the easiest, then PIM, then PFM. The approximation guarantees of BOM and PIM are in expectation, while those of PFM are in worst-case.

== See also ==
- Market research
- Algorithmic pricing
