= Consensus estimate =

Consensus estimate is a technique for designing truthful mechanisms in a prior-free mechanism design setting. The technique was introduced for digital goods auctions and later extended to more general settings.

Suppose there is a digital good that we want to sell to a group of buyers with unknown valuations. We want to determine the price that will bring us maximum profit. Suppose we have a function that, given the valuations of the buyers, tells us the maximum profit that we can make. We can use it in the following way:

1. Ask the buyers to tell their valuations.
2. Calculate $R_{max}$ - the maximum profit possible given the valuations.
3. Calculate a price that guarantees that we get a profit of $R_{max}$.

Step 3 can be attained by a profit extraction mechanism, which is a truthful mechanism. However, in general the mechanism is not truthful, since the buyers can try to influence $R_{max}$ by bidding strategically. To solve this problem, we can replace the exact $R_{max}$ with an approximation - $R_{app}$ - that, with high probability, cannot be influenced by a single agent.

As an example, suppose that we know that the valuation of each single agent is at most 0.1. As a first attempt of a consensus-estimate, let $R_{app} = \lfloor R_{max} \rfloor$ = the value of $R_{max}$ rounded to the nearest integer below it. Intuitively, in "most cases", a single agent cannot influence the value of $R_{app}$ (e.g., if with true reports $R_{max}=56.7$, then a single agent can only change it to between $R_{max}=56.6$ and $R_{max}=56.8$, but in all cases $R_{app}=56$).

To make the notion of "most cases" more accurate, define: $R_{app} = \lfloor R_{max} + U \rfloor$, where $U$ is a random variable drawn uniformly from $[0,1]$. This makes $R_{app}$ a random variable too. With probability at least 90%, $R_{app}$ cannot be influenced by any single agent, so a mechanism that uses $R_{app}$ is truthful with high probability.

Such random variable $R_{app}$ is called a consensus estimate:

- "Consensus" means that, with high probability, a single agent cannot influence the outcome, so that there is an agreement between the outcomes with or without the agent.
- "Estimate" means that the random variable is near the real variable that we are interested in - the variable $R_{max}$.

The disadvantages of using a consensus estimate are:

- It does not give us the optimal profit - but it gives us an approximately-optimal profit.
- It is not entirely truthful - it is only "truthful with high probability" (the probability that an agent can gain from deviating goes to 0 when the number of winning agents grows).

In practice, instead of rounding down to the nearest integer, it is better to use exponential rounding - rounding down to the nearest power of some constant. In the case of digital goods, using this consensus-estimate allows us to attain at least 1/3.39 of the optimal profit, even in worst-case scenarios.

== See also ==
- Random-sampling mechanism - an alternative approach to prior-free mechanism design.
