= Monotone =

Monotone refers to a sound, for example music or speech, that has a single unvaried tone. See pure tone and monotonic scale.

Monotone or monotonicity may also refer to:

== In economics ==
- Monotone preferences, a property of a consumer's preference ordering.
- Monotonicity (mechanism design), a property of a social choice function.
- Monotonicity criterion, a property of a voting system.
- Resource monotonicity, a property of resource allocation rules and bargaining systems.

== In mathematics ==
- Monotone class theorem, in measure theory
- Monotone convergence theorem, in mathematics
- Monotone polygon, a property of a geometric object
- Monotonic function, a property of a mathematical function
- Monotonicity of entailment, a property of some logical systems
- Monotonically increasing, a property of number sequence

== Other uses ==
- Monotone (software), an open source revision control system
- Monotonic orthography, simplified spelling of modern Greek
- The Monotones, 1950s American rock and roll band
- Quantifier monotonicity, in formal semantics
- "Monotone" (song), a song by Yoasobi for 2024 animated film Fureru
- "Monotone", a song by American alternative rock band Splender
