= Digital goods =

Intangible goods that exist in digital form

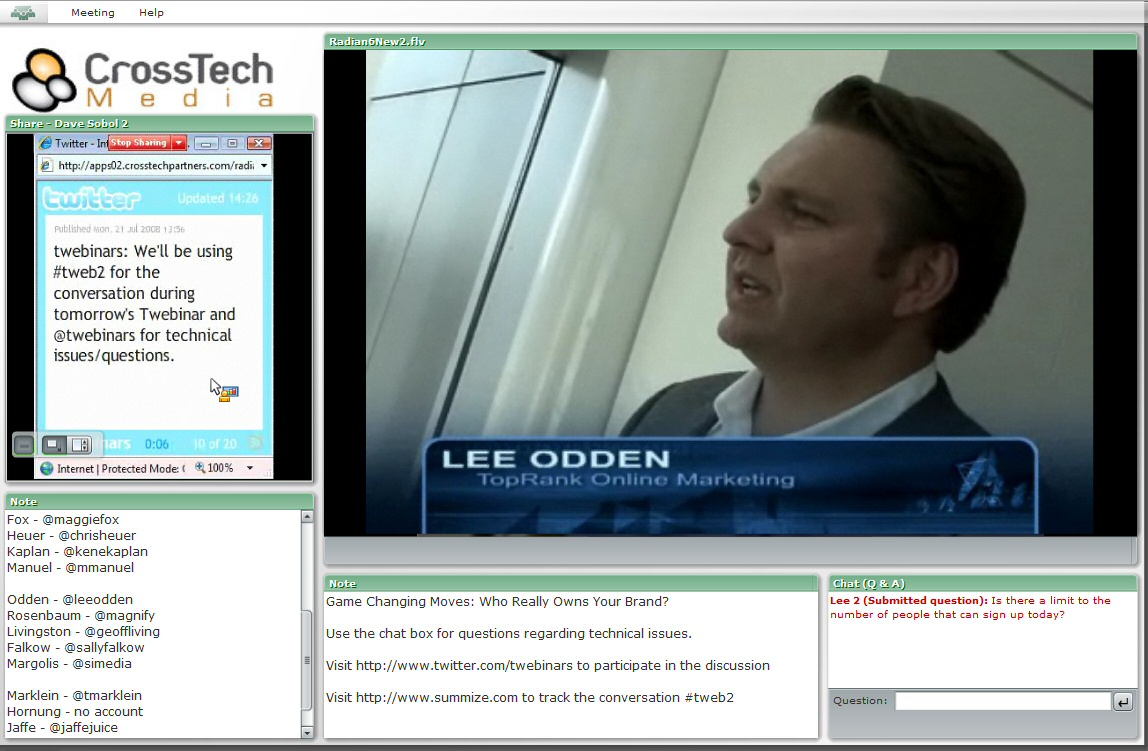
If you pay to watch a web conference on your computer screen, you have bought a digital good.

Digital goods or e-goods are intangible goods that exist in digital form. Examples are Wikipedia articles; digital media, such as e-books, downloadable music, internet radio, internet television and streaming media; fonts, logos, photos and graphics; digital subscriptions; online ads (as purchased by the advertiser); internet coupons; electronic tickets; electronically treated documentation in many different fields; downloadable software (Digital Distribution) and mobile apps; cloud-based applications and online games; virtual goods used within the virtual economies of online games and communities; community access; workbooks; worksheets; planners; e-learning (online courses); webinars, video tutorials, blog posts; cards; patterns; website themes and templates.

== Legal concerns about digital goods ==
Special legal concerns regarding digital goods include copyright infringement and taxation. Also the question of the ownership (versus licensed use or service only) of purely digital goods is not finally resolved. For instance, the software installers of the digital software distributor gog.com are technically independent to the account but are still subject to the EULA, where a "licensed, not sold" formulation is used. Therefore, it is not clear if the software can be legally used after a hypothetical loss of the account; a question which was also raised before in practice for the similar service Steam.

In July 2012, the European Court of Justice ruled in the case UsedSoft GMbH v. Oracle International Corp. that the sale of a software product, either through a physical support or download, constituted a transfer of ownership in EU law, thus the first sale doctrine applies; the ruling thereby breaks the "licensed, not sold" legal theory, but leaves open numerous questions. Therefore, it is also permissible to resell software licenses even if the digital good has been downloaded directly from the Internet, as the first-sale doctrine applied whenever software was originally sold to a customer for an unlimited amount of time, thus prohibiting any software maker from preventing the resale of their software by any of their legitimate owners. The court requires that the previous owner must no longer be able to use the licensed software after the resale, but finds that the practical difficulties in enforcing this clause should not be an obstacle to authorizing resale, as they are also present for software which can be installed from physical supports, where the first-sale doctrine is in force.

In several cases, content providers have faced criticism for revoking access to digital goods due to expired licenses or the discontinuation of a product, such as ebooks (which resulted in a lawsuit against Amazon.com, Inc.), digital video (with Sony Interactive Entertainment revoking access to purchased StudioCanal content from its now-defunct PlayStation video store; a similar move involving Warner Bros. Discovery content was averted by an updated license agreement), and video games (such as Ubisoft discontinuing and revoking access to its game The Crew without providing refunds or the ability to redownload the game) In September 2024, the U.S. state of California implemented a consumer protection law that prohibits the use of terms such as "buy" or "purchase" during transactions involving digital goods if there is no way to obtain the purchases in a manner that cannot be revoked by the seller (such as allowing it to be downloaded for permanent, offline access), and requires a disclaimer to be displayed to the customer at the time of purchase.

== See also ==
- Digital asset
- Digital currency
- Digital distribution
- Digital goods auction
- E-commerce
