= Andrew Caplin =

British economist (born 1959)

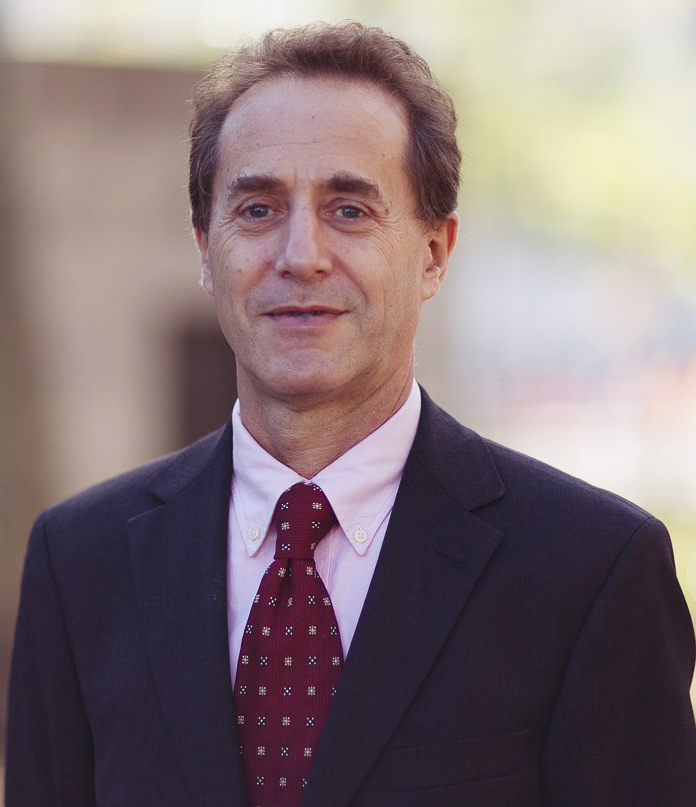
- Born: 15 June 1956 (age 70); London, England

Academic background
- Education: University of Cambridge (BA); Yale University (PhD)
- Doctoral advisor: William Nordhaus; Herbert Scarf; James Tobin

Academic work
- Discipline: Behavioral economics; Neuroeconomics
- Institutions: New York University

Andrew S. Caplin (born 15 June 1956 in London, England) is a British economist, now living in the United States, where he received his Ph.D. from Yale University in 1983. He is a professor of economics at New York University, co-director of the Center for Experimental Social Science, and Research Associate at the National Bureau of Economic Research. Caplin's research focuses on six areas: (1). economics and psychology (behavioral economics,) (2.) indivisibility and economic outcome, (3.) life cycle consumption and portfolio choice, (4.) real estate finance, and (5.) individual differences and outcomes in economics and policies.

Caplin has published extensively and serves as co-Editor with Andrew Schotter of the Oxford University Press/CESS series of publications entitled "Methods of Modern Economics", is a fellow of the Econometric Society, an associate editor of the Quarterly Journal of Economics, co-editor of Economic Inquiry, and has testified on public housing policy before the United States congress.

== Selected publications ==
- "Home Equity Insurance" in E. Glaser and J. Quigley(eds.) Housing Markets and the Economy. Lincoln Press, 2009. (co-author).
- "Economic Theory and Psychological Data," in A. Caplin and A. Schotter, A. (eds.) Foundations of Positive and Normative Economics, OUP, 2008.
- "Annuity Valuation, Long Term Care, and Bequest Motives" in J. Ameriks and O. Mitchess (eds.) Recalibrating Retirement spending and Saving, Oxford University Press, 2003 (co-author).
- “Equilibrium in a Durables Goods Market with Lumpy Adjustment Costs,” with John Leahy, Journal of Economic Theory, 187–213, 2006.
- “Economic Theory and the World of Practice: A Celebration of the (S,s) Model”, with John Leahy, Journal of Economic Perspectives, 2010.
- “Trading Frictions and House Price Dynamics”, with John Leahy, forthcoming in Journal of Money, Credit, and Banking, 2010.
- Machine Learning and the Spatial Structure of House Prices and Housing Returns, with Sumit Chopra, John Leahy, Yann LeCun, and Trivikraman Thampy, mimeo. 2008.
- "Behavioral Policy" in I. Brocas and J. Carillo (eds). The Psychology of Individual Decisions. Oxford University Press, 2003 (co-author).
- "Fear as a Policy instrument" in R. Baumeister et al. (eds.) Time and Decision. Russell Sage, 2003 (co-author).
- "The Reverse Mortgage Market: Problems and Prospects" in O. Mitcvhell et a.l (eds.) Innovations in Retirement Financing. University of Pennsylvania Press, 2002.
- "Comparative Statics with Indivisible Goods: The Five Market Transitions," with John Leahy, mimeo.
