= Dilip Abreu =

Indian-American economist

Academic background
- Education: Princeton University (PhD 1983); Balliol College, Oxford (MA 1980); University of Delhi (MA 1978); University of Bombay (BA 1975)
- Doctoral advisor: Hugo F. Sonnenschein

Dilip Abreu is an Indian-American economist who is currently Professor of Economics at New York University. Abreu is an Elected Fellow of the American Academy of Arts and Sciences and the Econometric Society.

== Early life and education ==
Abreu grew up in South Mumbai, and attended St Mary's School. He earned an undergraduate degree in economics and statistics from Elphinstone College at the University of Mumbai in 1975, and a master's degree in economics and econometrics from Delhi School of Economics at University of Delhi in 1978. He earned another master's degree in economics and mathematical economics from Balliol College at University of Oxford in 1980. He enrolled in the doctoral program in economics at Princeton University under the supervision of Hugo Sonnenschein, finishing in three years. For his PhD thesis, titled Repeated Games with Discounting: A General Theory and an Application to Oligopoly, Abreu studied repeated interactions among self-interested strategic agents.

== Career ==
Abreu joined a post-doctoral fellowship at the University of Minnesota in 1983. His first appointment was as an assistant professor at Harvard University in 1984. He joined the economics department at Princeton University as a full professor in 1990. He had a brief stint at Yale University from 1995 to 1997, whereupon he returned to Princeton as the Edward E. Matthews, Class of 1953, Professor of Finance and Professor of Economics. He left Princeton to join New York University as a professor of economics in 2017.

== Selected publications ==
- Abreu, Dilip; Rubinstein, Ariel (1988). "The Structure of Nash Equilibrium in Repeated Games with Finite Automata". Econometrica. 56 (6): 1259. doi:10.2307/1913097. JSTOR 1913097.
- Abreu, Dilip; Milgrom, Paul; Pearce, David (1991). "Information and Timing in Repeated Partnerships" (PDF). Econometrica. 59 (6): 1713. doi:10.2307/2938286. JSTOR 2938286. Archived from the original (PDF) on 2022-05-18.
