= Truthful job scheduling =

Truthful job scheduling is a mechanism design variant of the job shop scheduling problem from operations research.

We have a project composed of several "jobs" (tasks). There are several workers. Each worker can do any job, but for each worker it takes a different amount of time to complete each job. Our goal is to allocate jobs to workers such that the total makespan of the project is minimized. In the standard job shop scheduling problem, the timings of all workers are known, so we have a standard optimization problem. In contrast, in the truthful job scheduling problem, the timings of the workers are not known. We ask each worker how much time he needs to do each job, but, the workers might lie to us. Therefore, we have to give the workers an incentive to tell us their true timings by paying them a certain amount of money. The challenge is to design a payment mechanism which is incentive compatible.

The truthful job scheduling problem was introduced by Nisan and Ronen in their 1999 paper on algorithmic mechanism design.

== Definitions ==
There are $n$ jobs and $m$ workers ("m" stands for "machine", since the problem comes from scheduling jobs to computers). Worker $i$ can do job $j$ in time $T_{i,j}$. If worker $i$ is assigned a set of jobs $J_i$, then he can execute them in time:

$$T_i(J_i) = \sum_{j\in J_i} t_{i,j}$$

Given an allocation $J_1,\dots,J_m$ of jobs to workers, The makespan of a project is:

$$MakeSpan(J_1,\dots,J_n) = \max_{i} {T_i(J_i)}$$

An optimal allocation is an allocation of jobs to workers in which the makespan is minimized. The minimum makespan is denoted by $MinMakeSpan$.

A mechanism is a function that takes as input the matrix $T$ (the time each worker needs to do each job) and returns as output:

- An allocation of jobs to workers, $J_1,\dots,J_n$;
- A payment to each worker, $p_1,\dots,p_n$.

The utility of worker $i$, under such mechanism, is:

$$u_i = p_i - T_i(J_i)$$

I.e, the agent gains the payment, but loses the time that it spends in executing the tasks. Note that payment and time are measured in the same units (e.g., we can assume that the payments are in dollars and that each time-unit costs the worker one dollar).

A mechanism is called truthful (or incentive compatible) if every worker can attain a maximum utility by reporting his true timing vector (i.e., no worker has an incentive to lie about his timings).

The approximation factor of a mechanism is the largest ratio between $Makespan$ and $MinMakespan$ (smaller is better; an approximation factor of 1 means that the mechanism is optimal).

The research on truthful job scheduling aims to find upper (positive) and lower (negative) bounds on approximation factors of truthful mechanisms.

== Positive bound – m – VCG mechanism ==
The first solution that comes to mind is VCG mechanism, which is a generic truthful mechanism. A VCG mechanism can be used to minimize the sum of costs. Here, we can use VCG to find an allocation which minimizes the "make-total", defined as:

$$MakeTotal(J_1,\dots,J_n) = \sum_{i} {T_i(J_i)}$$

Here, minimizing the sum can be done by simply allocating each job to the worker who needs the shortest time for that job. To keep the mechanism truthful, each worker that accepts a job is paid the second-shortest time for that job (like in a Vickrey auction).

Let OPT be an allocation which minimizes the makespan. Then:

$$MakeSpan[VCG] \leq MakeTotal[VCG] \leq MakeTotal[OPT] \leq m\cdot MakeSpan[OPT]$$

(where the last inequality follows from the pigeonhole principle). Hence, the approximation factor of the VCG solution is at most $m$ – the number of workers.

The following example shows that the approximation factor of the VCG solution can indeed be exactly $m$. Suppose there are $n=m$ jobs and the timings of the workers are as follows:

- Worker 1 can do every job in time 1.
- The other workers can do every job in time $1+\epsilon$, where $\epsilon>0$ is a small constant.

Then, the VCG mechanism allocates all tasks to worker 1. Both the "make-total" and the makespan are $n=m$. But, when each job is assigned to a different worker, the makespan is $1+\epsilon$.

An approximation factor of $m$ is not very good, and many researchers have tried to improve it over the following years.

On the other hand, there are some impossibility results that prove that the approximation factor cannot be too small.

== Negative bound – 2 ==
The approximation factor of every truthful deterministic mechanism is at least 2.

The proof is typical of lower bounds in mechanism design. We check specific scenarios (in our case, specific timings of the workers). By truthfulness, when a single worker changes his declaration, he must not be able to gain from it. This induces some constraints on the allocations returned by the mechanism in the different scenarios.

In the following proof sketch, for simplicity we assume that there are 2 workers and that the number of jobs is even, $n = 2k$. We consider the following scenarios:

1. The timings of both workers to all jobs are 1. Since the mechanism is deterministic, it must return a unique allocation $J_1,J_2$. Suppose, without loss of generality, that $|J_1| \leq |J_2|$ (worker 1 is assigned at most as many jobs as worker 2).
2. The timings of worker 1 to the jobs in $J_1$ are $\epsilon$ (a very small positive constant); the timings of worker 1 to the jobs in $J_2$ are $1+\epsilon$; and the timings of worker 2 to all jobs is still 1. Worker 1 knows that, if he lies and says that his timings to all jobs are 1, the (deterministic) mechanism will allocate him the jobs in $J_1$ and his cost will be very near 0. In order to remain truthful, the mechanism must do the same here, so that worker 1 does not gain from lying. However, the makespan can be made half as large by dividing the jobs in $J_2$ equally between the agents.

Hence, the approximation factor of the mechanism must be at least 2.

== Monotonicity and Truthfulness ==
Consider the special case of Uniform-machines scheduling, in which the workers are single-parametric: for each worker there is a speed, and the time it takes the worker to do a job is the job length divided by the speed. The speed is the worker's private information, and we want to incentivize machines to reveal their true speeds. Archer and Tardos prove that a scheduling algorithm is truthful if and only if it is monotone. This means that, if a machine reports a higher speed, and all other inputs remain the same, then the total processing time allocated to the machine weakly increases. For this problem:

- Auletta, De Prisco, Penna and Persiano presented a 4-approximation monotone algorithm, which runs in polytime when the number of machines is fixed.
- Ambrosio and Auletta proved that the Longest Processing Time algorithm is monotone whenever the machine speeds are powers of some c ≥ 2, but not when c ≤ 1.78. In contrast, List scheduling is not monotone for c > 2.
- Andelman, Azar and Sorani presented a 5-approximation monotone algorithm, which runs in polytime even when the number of machines is variable.
- Kovacz presented a 3-approximation monotone algorithm.

== Predictions ==
Balkanski, Gkatzelis and Tan study truthful unrelated-machines scheduling when, in addition to the agents' reports on their processing times, the algorithm has access to predictions of their processing times. In this framework, the goal is to get improved approximations when the predictions are accurate ("consistency"), and near-optimal worst-case approximations when the predictions are wrong ("robustness"). They present a deterministic polytime truthful mechanism that is 6-consistent and 2n-robust. They also show that any 1-consistent deterministic truthful mechanism cannot attain any bounded robustness.
