= Kavita Singh (scholar) =

Indian art historian (1964–2023)

- Born: 5 November 1964
- Died: 30 July 2023 (aged 58)
- Occupations: Professor, writer and curator
- Title: Doctor
- Board member of: J. Paul Getty Trust
- Awards: American Academy of Arts and Sciences; Infosys Prize

Academic background
- Education: B.A. English literature M.S. Ph.D.
- Alma mater: Lady Shri Ram College; Maharaja Sayajirao University of Baroda; Panjab University

Academic work
- Discipline: Art History
- Sub-discipline: Museum Studies, Mughal Painting, Rajput Painting and Iconoclasm
- Institutions: Jawaharlal Nehru University
- Main interests: Manuscript Painting Traditions in India, history of museums in South Asia and the Repatriation of Cultural Artefacts
- Notable works: Scent upon a Southern Breeze: The Synaesthetic Arts of the Deccan
- Notable ideas: Historical function and role of museums, museums and nationalism

Kavita Singh (5 November 1964 – 30 July 2023) was an Indian art historian. A professor of art history, she served as the dean at the School of Arts and Aesthetics of Jawaharlal Nehru University.

== Education ==
Kavita Singh obtained her Bachelor of Arts degree at Lady Shri Ram College, her MFA in 1987 from M.S. University, Baroda and her PhD in 1996 from Punjab University.

== Career ==
Singh was appointed to Jawaharlal Nehru University (JNU) in 2001, where she was a co-founder of the internationally recognized School of Art and Aesthetics. She served there as a professor till her death. Her research interests covered the history of Indian painting, particularly the Mughal and Rajput schools, and the history and politics of museums, with a special focus on India.

Before joining JNU, Singh taught at the College of Art, Delhi and the National Institute of Technology Delhi. She was also a research editor for Marg Publications, and a visiting guest curator at the San Diego Museum of Art, during which time she co-curated the exhibition Power and Desire: South Asian Paintings from the San Diego Museum of Art, Edwin Binney 3rd Collection. The exhibition ran in New York from 10 October 2000 to 7 January 2001. A catalogue by Omina Okada appeared subsequently.

In 2007, Singh led a curatorial team for the second exhibition of the newly opened Devi Art Foundation. The exhibition was titled Where in the World. An abridged version of Singh's introduction to the catalogue appeared online. From 2009–2012 she was a partner at the Kunsthistorisches Institut in Florenz of the Max Planck Society with Professor Dr. Gerhard Wolf and Hannah Baader for a project called The Temple and the Museum: Sites for Art in India.

== Death ==
Kavita Singh died of cancer on 30 July 2023, at the age of 58.

== Recognition ==
Kavita Singh was elected as an International Honorary Fellow of the American Academy of Arts and Sciences in 2020, one of 37 foreign inductees that year, and the only one from India in the field of Arts and Humanities.

In 2018, she was awarded the Infosys Prize in Humanities for her work in the field of art history and visual culture. In her acceptance speech, she joked that her presence at the ceremony was illegitimate as her leave from JNU to visit Bangalore had not been approved.

She received numerous fellowships and scholarships throughout her career, including from the Getty Research Institute, the Sterling and Francine Clark Art Institute, Williams College, the Nehru Trust for the Indian Collections at the Victoria and Albert Museum, and the Asia Society in New York.

== Lectures ==
- Looking East, Looking West: Mughal Painting between Persia and Europe (Getty Research Institute, 2015)
- Congress of Kings: Thoughts on a painting of Muhammad Shah Rangila (Kiran Nadar Museum of Art, 2018)
- Word against Image in Mughal Chronicles (Bangalore International Centre, 2021)
- A New Museum for a New Nation (Fralin Museum of Art at The University of Virginia, 2021)
- Endless Prospects: View from a Terrace in 18th-century Awadh (Met Museum, 2022)
- Book of Gold (American Institute of Indian Studies, 2022)
- An Embarrassment of Riches: Indian Architectural Exhibits at the V&A (Sydney Asian Art Series, 2023)

== Publications ==
- New Insights Into Sikh Art (2003, edited)
- InFlux: Contemporary Art in Asia (2013, co-edited)
- No Touching, No Spitting, No Praying: The Museum in South Asia (2014, co-edited)
- Nauras - The Many Arts of the Deccan (2015, co-edited)
- Museums, Heritage, Culture: Into the Conflict Zone (2015, co-edited)
- Real Birds in Imagined Gardens: Mughal Painting Between Persia and Europe (2017)
- Scent Upon A Southern Breeze: The Synaesthetic Arts of the Deccan (2018, edited)
- Ghosts of Future Nations: Gods, Migrants and Tribals in the Late Modern Museum (2024, co-edited. Museum of Ephemera, forthcoming, part of the series India Since the 90s).
