= Single-parameter utility =

In mechanism design, an agent is said to have single-parameter utility if his valuation of the possible outcomes can be represented by a single number. For example, in an auction for a single item, the utilities of all agents are single-parametric, since they can be represented by their monetary evaluation of the item. In contrast, in a combinatorial auction for two or more related items, the utilities are usually not single-parametric, since they are usually represented by their evaluations to all possible bundles of items.

== Notation ==
There is a set $X$ of possible outcomes.

There are $n$ agents which have different valuations for each outcome.

In general, each agent can assign a different and unrelated value to every outcome in $X$.

In the special case of single-parameter utility, each agent $i$ has a publicly known outcome proper subset $W_i \subset X$ which are the "winning outcomes" for agent $i$ (e.g., in a single-item auction, $W_i$ contains the outcome in which agent $i$ wins the item).

For every agent, there is a number $v_i$ which represents the "winning-value" of $i$. The agent's valuation of the outcomes in $X$ can take one of two values:

- $v_i$ for each outcome in $W_i$;
- 0 for each outcome in $X\setminus W_i$.

The vector of the winning-values of all agents is denoted by $v$.

For every agent $i$, the vector of all winning-values of the other agents is denoted by $v_{-i}$. So $v \equiv (v_i,v_{-i})$.

A social choice function is a function that takes as input the value-vector $v$ and returns an outcome $x\in X$. It is denoted by $\text{Outcome}(v)$ or $\text{Outcome}(v_i,v_{-i})$.

== Monotonicity ==
The weak monotonicity property has a special form in single-parameter domains. A social choice function is weakly-monotonic if for every agent $i$ and every $v_i,v_i',v_{-i}$, if:

$\text{Outcome}(v_i, v_{-i}) \in W_i$ and
$v'_i \geq v_i > 0$ then:
$$\text{Outcome}(v'_i, v_{-i}) \in W_i$$

I.e, if agent $i$ wins by declaring a certain value, then he can also win by declaring a higher value (when the declarations of the other agents are the same).

The monotonicity property can be generalized to randomized mechanisms, which return a probability-distribution over the space $X$. The WMON property implies that for every agent $i$ and every $v_i,v_i',v_{-i}$, the function:

$$\Pr[\text{Outcome}(v_i, v_{-i}) \in W_i]$$

is a weakly-increasing function of $v_i$.

=== Critical value ===
For every weakly-monotone social-choice function, for every agent $i$ and for every vector $v_{-i}$, there is a critical value $c_i(v_{-i})$, such that agent $i$ wins if-and-only-if his bid is at least $c_i(v_{-i})$.

For example, in a second-price auction, the critical value for agent $i$ is the highest bid among the other agents.

In single-parameter environments, deterministic truthful mechanisms have a very specific format. Any deterministic truthful mechanism is fully specified by the set of functions c. Agent $i$ wins if and only if his bid is at least $c_i(v_{-i})$, and in that case, he pays exactly $c_i(v_{-i})$.

== Deterministic implementation ==
It is known that, in any domain, weak monotonicity is a necessary condition for implementability. I.e, a social-choice function can be implemented by a truthful mechanism, only if it is weakly-monotone.

In a single-parameter domain, weak monotonicity is also a sufficient condition for implementability. I.e, for every weakly-monotonic social-choice function, there is a deterministic truthful mechanism that implements it. This means that it is possible to implement various non-linear social-choice functions, e.g. maximizing the sum-of-squares of values or the min-max value.

The mechanism should work in the following way:

- Ask the agents to reveal their valuations, $v$.
- Select the outcome based on the social-choice function: $x = \text{Outcome}[v]$.
- Every winning agent (every agent $i$ such that $x \in W_i$) pays a price equal to the critical value: $\text{Price}_i(x, v_{-i}) = -c_i(v_{-i})$.
- Every losing agent (every agent $i$ such that $x \notin W_i$) pays nothing: $\text{Price}_i(x, v_{-i}) = 0$.

This mechanism is truthful, because the net utility of each agent is:

- $v_i - c_i(v_{-i})$ if he wins;
- 0 if he loses.

Hence, the agent prefers to win if $v_i>c_{-i}$ and to lose if $v_i<c_{-i}$, which is exactly what happens when he tells the truth.

== Randomized implementation ==
A randomized mechanism is a probability-distribution on deterministic mechanisms. A randomized mechanism is called truthful-in-expectation if truth-telling gives the agent a largest expected value.

In a randomized mechanism, every agent $i$ has a probability of winning, defined as:

$$w_i(v_i,v_{-i}) := \Pr[\text{Outcome}(v_i,v_{-i})\in W_i]$$

and an expected payment, defined as:

$$\mathbb{E}[\text{Payment}_i(v_i,v_{-i})]$$

In a single-parameter domain, a randomized mechanism is truthful-in-expectation if-and-only if:

- The probability of winning, $w_i(v_i,v_{-i})$, is a weakly-increasing function of $v_i$;
- The expected payment of an agent is:

$$\mathbb{E}[\text{Payment}_i(v_i,v_{-i})] = v_i\cdot w_i(v_i,v_{-i}) - \int_{0}^{v_i} w_i(t,v_{-i}) dt$$

Note that in a deterministic mechanism, $w_i(v_i,v_{-i})$ is either 0 or 1, the first condition reduces to weak-monotonicity of the Outcome function and the second condition reduces to charging each agent his critical value.

== Single-parameter vs. multi-parameter domains ==
When the utilities are not single-parametric (e.g. in combinatorial auctions), the mechanism design problem is much more complicated. The VCG mechanism is one of the only mechanisms that works for such general valuations.

== See also ==
- Single peaked preferences
