= Digital goods auction =

In auction theory, a digital goods auction is an auction in which a seller has an unlimited supply of a certain item.

A typical example is when a company sells a digital good, such as a movie. The company can create an unlimited number of copies of that movie in a negligible cost. The company's goal is to maximize its profit; to do this, it has to find the optimal price: if the price is too high, only few people will buy the item; if the price is too low, many people will buy but the total revenue will be low. The optimal price of the movie depends on the valuations of the potential consumers - how much each consumer is willing to pay to buy a movie.

If the valuations of all potential consumers are known, then the company faces a simple optimization problem - selecting the price that maximizes the profit. For concreteness, suppose there is a set $S$ of consumers and that they are ordered by their valuation, so that the consumer with the highest valuation (willing to pay the largest price for the movie) is called "1", the next-highest is called "2", etc. The valuation of consumer $i$ is denoted by $v_i$, such that $v_1\geq v_2\geq\dots$. For every $i$, if the price is set to $p\in(v_{i+1},v_i]$, then only the first $i$ consumers buy the movie, so the profit of the company is $p\cdot i$. It is clear that in this case, the company is best-off setting the price at exactly $v_i$; in this case its profit is $v_i\cdot i$. Hence, the company's optimization problem is:

$$\arg\max_{i\in S} (v_i\cdot i)$$

The problem is that, usually, the valuations of the consumers are NOT known. The company can try to ask them, but then they will have an incentive to report lower valuations in order to decrease the price. There is much research on designing strategyproof digital goods auctions. Most of them are based on one of two approaches:

- Random-sampling mechanisms,
- Consensus estimates.

More details and references can be found there.
