= Virtual valuation =

Concept in auction theory

In auction theory, particularly Bayesian-optimal mechanism design, a virtual valuation of an agent is a function that measures the surplus that can be extracted from that agent.

A typical application is a seller who wants to sell an item to a potential buyer and wants to decide on the optimal price. The optimal price depends on the valuation of the buyer to the item, $v$. The seller does not know $v$ exactly, but he assumes that $v$ is a random variable, with some cumulative distribution function $F(v)$ and probability distribution function $f(v) := F'(v)$.

The virtual valuation of the agent is defined as:

$$r(v) := v - \frac{1-F(v)}{f(v)}$$

== Applications ==
A key theorem of Myerson says that:

The expected profit of any truthful mechanism is equal to its expected virtual surplus.

In the case of a single buyer, this implies that the price $p$ should be determined according to the equation:

$$r(p) = 0$$

This guarantees that the buyer will buy the item, if and only if his virtual-valuation is weakly-positive, so the seller will have a weakly-positive expected profit.

This exactly equals the optimal sale price – the price that maximizes the expected value of the seller's profit, given the distribution of valuations:

$$p = \operatorname{argmax}_v v\cdot (1-F(v))$$

Virtual valuations can be used to construct Bayesian-optimal mechanisms also when there are multiple buyers, or different item-types.

== Examples ==
1. The buyer's valuation has a continuous uniform distribution in $[0,1]$. So:

- $F(v) = v \text{ in } [0,1]$
- $f(v) = 1 \text{ in } [0,1]$
- $r(v) = 2v-1 \text{ in } [0,1]$
- $r^{-1}(0) = 1/2$, so the optimal single-item price is 1/2.

2. The buyer's valuation has a normal distribution with mean 0 and standard deviation 1. $w(v)$ is monotonically increasing, and crosses the x-axis in about 0.75, so this is the optimal price. The crossing point moves right when the standard deviation is larger.

== Regularity ==
A probability distribution function is called regular if its virtual-valuation function is weakly-increasing. Regularity is important because it implies that the virtual-surplus can be maximized by a truthful mechanism.

A sufficient condition for regularity is monotone hazard rate, which means that the following function is weakly-increasing:

$$r(v) := \frac{f(v)}{1-F(v)}$$

Monotone-hazard-rate implies regularity, but the opposite is not true.

The proof is simple: the monotone hazard rate implies $-\frac{1}{r(v)}$ is weakly increasing in $v$ and therefore the virtual valuation $v-\frac{1}{r(v)}$ is strictly increasing in $v$.

== See also ==
- Myerson ironing
- Algorithmic pricing
