= WNJN =

WNJN may refer to:

- WNJN (TV), a television station (channel 50) licensed to Montclair, New Jersey, United States
- WNJN-FM, a radio station (89.7 FM) licensed to Atlantic City, New Jersey, United States
