= Steve Adubato =

Steve Adubato may refer to:

- Steve Adubato Sr. (1932–2020), American politician
- Steve Adubato Jr. (born 1957), American media personality
