= Adubato =

Adubato is a surname. Notable people with the surname include:

- Michael F. Adubato (1934–1993), member of the New Jersey General Assembly
- Richie Adubato (1937–2025), American basketball coach
- Steve Adubato Sr. (1932–2020), American educator and local politician
- Steve Adubato Jr. (born 1957), American writer, journalist, motivational speaker and politician
