= WNJT =

WNJT may refer to:

- WNJT (TV), a television station (channel 52) licensed to Trenton, New Jersey, United States
- WNJT-FM, a radio station (88.1 FM) licensed to Trenton, New Jersey, United States
