= Sandra King =

America television broadcast journalist and news anchor

- Born: September 18, 1946 (age 80); Newark, New Jersey, U.S.
- Education: Rutgers-Newark (BA, Sociology and English), Bard College
- Occupations: Journalist, news presenter
- Years active: 1973–present
- Known for: NJN News
- Presenting career
- Stations: New Jersey Network, NJ PBS
- Country: United States

Sandra King (born September 18, 1946) is an American television broadcast journalist and primetime news anchor. She started as a reporter and anchor for NJN News on the New Jersey Network in 1978. King co-hosted Due Process with Raymond M. Brown from 1997 to 2018. Her journalism and programs often center on race, class, and justice issues in the United States.

== Early life ==
King was born in Newark, New Jersey, on September 18, 1946 to Henry King, a sales representative for Eagle Work Clothes, Inc., and Barbara King. She attended Weequahic High School and graduated in 1968 at age 16. After graduating, she enrolled at Bard College and received a Bachelor of Arts in Sociology and English from Rutgers-Newark.

== Career ==
King began her career as a typist and later a reporter on urban affairs for The Star-Ledger in 1969. Her work included a 14-part series in 1970 on the feminist movement. In 1976, she was hired by WNET/Channel 13 as a part-time reporter to cover city issues in Newark, and in 1978 she became a senior reporter for the New Jersey Nightly News.

Discussing her career as a journalist in an interview with the New York Times, King described her experience in broadcast journalism:

"more intimate and, therefore, more exacting because pictures tell the same kind of story, only in a different way. When you're dealing with a Newark welfare mother, it's my job to make that person real for someone sitting in front of their TV set in Upper Saddle River. It's my responsibility to make that person see that woman as a human being, instead of just another statistic. And that reality begins with the human heart."

In the 1980s, King taught journalism courses at Rutgers-Newark. Shriver also served as Saturday anchor in 1989, Sunday anchor in 1990, and a contributing anchor on NBC Nightly New from 1996 to 1999.

In 1997, King joined Due Process as a host alongside Raymond M. Brown until its final episode in 2018. The show won 25 local Emmy Awards and had over 100 nominations.

== Personal life ==
On March 4, 1978, King married Ramon Stewart Scruggs Jr. She serves on the board of trustees for the Newark Public Library and New Jersey Institute for Social Justice.

== Awards ==
- American Film Institute's Bennett Award for Best Locally Produced Documentary
- The National Headliner Award
- The American Women in Radio and TV’s Pinnacle Award
- The Leigh Whipper Gold Award from the Philadelphia International Film Festival
- The CPB's Silver Medal
- Honors at the Chicago, Athens and Houston Film Festivals
- 25 New York and Mid-Atlantic Emmy Awards and more than 100 nominations

== Filmography ==
- Newark: The Slow Road Back
- Newark Then Newark Now
- Rage in America
- Voices from Newark
- The Writing on the Wall (1986)
