= Kent Manahan =

American television broadcast journalist

- Born: Barbara Ann Kohlschreiber; Morris County, New Jersey, U.S.
- Education: Dunbarton College of the Holy Cross (BA, English and Political Science)
- Occupations: Journalist, news presenter
- Years active: 1973–present
- Known for: NJN News
- Presenting career
- Stations: New Jersey Network, NJ PBS
- Country: United States

Kent Manahan is an American television broadcast journalist and primetime news anchor. She was a reporter and anchor for New Jersey Network from 1974 until 2008. Since 2021, she has been the host of Governors' Perpsectives with Kent Manahan, a NJ PBS special program featuring interviews with past New Jersey governors discussing state and national politics.

== Early life ==
Kent Manahan grew up in Madison, New Jersey. Her mother, Mary Kohlschreiber, was a homemaker, and her father, Edward H. Kohlschreiber, was in the paper box business. Raised Catholic and the oldest of three children, she attended Bayley-Ellard High School, where she worked for her high school newspaper. She later attended Dunbarton College of the Holy Cross, where she majored in English and minored in political science.

== Career ==
In the early 1970s Manahan worked as a freelancer, including work at the Daily Record, a Morristown radio station and Cablevision. In 1973, she sold a weekly program about local history to public access TV.

Manahan began her work at New Jersey Network in 1975 as a part-time reporter, and became anchorwoman for New Jersey Nightly News in 1981. As a news anchor, she introduced a segment featuring former governors debating current affairs. In 1985, she was a reporter and contributing producer for New Jersey Network's Battered Wives, Shattered Lives, a documentary covering domestic violence that was broadcast nationally. In 1984, she won the first New Jersey Broadcaster of the Year award by the Montclair State College’s DuMont Television Center.

Manahan stepped down as a New Jersey Network news anchor in 2008. She was nominated by the New Jersey Public Broadcasting Authority to serve as the acting Executive Director of the New Jersey Network and president of the NJN Foundation, which raised funds for the network, before fully retiring in 2009. After her retirement, she became a member of the New Jersey Public Broadcasting Authority and remained in her position on the board of regents at Seton Hall University.

In April 2021 her previous segments interviewing former New Jersey governors was expanded into a NJ PBS Special as Governors’ Perspectives with Kent Manahan, covering contemporary issues in New Jersey politics. An Emmy-nominated series, Governors’ Perspectives is produced in partnership with The Eagleton Center on the American Governor at Rutgers University.

== Personal life ==
In 1966, Manahan married Peter Manahan, a former Morris County prosecutor, who later worked as a lawyer. Though Manahan worked in Trenton, she and her husband remained in Morris County, where they raised six children.

In 1998 Manahan alongside other New Jersey Nightly News anchors had a cameo in the film Fallen.
