= Due Process (TV series) =

- Presented by: Raymond M. Brown; Sandra King
- Country of origin: United States
- Original language: English

Production
- Running time: 30 minutes

Original release
- Network: NJN (1996–2011); NJTV (2011–2018).

Due Process was a legal affairs television show which aired on NJTV (and its predecessor, NJN) and WNET from 1995-2018. Premiering in November 1995, Due Process had been continually broadcasting about New Jersey's legal community. With 22 seasons, as of 2018, Due Process was NJTV’s award-winning weekly series on law and justice issues, funding in part by the Fund for New Jersey. The show won 25 local Emmy Awards, with over 100 nominations

Due Process was hosted by Raymond M. Brown and Sandra King and was a half-hour show usually composed of a pre-recorded segment followed by a discussion with up to three guests. Recent issues included the confirmation of Supreme Court Justice Sonia Sotomayor, the Pew Study on Prisons, the nature of corruption in New Jersey, and the strides made towards diversity in the legal profession. The last episode aired on May 5, 2018.
