= NJN =

NJN may refer to the following:

- New Jersey Network, the former statewide public television and radio network in New Jersey, a member of PBS and NPR
- New Jersey Nets, a former American professional basketball team in the National Basketball Association (NBA)
- Nederlandse Jeugdbond voor Natuurstudie, Dutch youth organisation for nature study and conservation/
