= Hometime =

Hometime can refer to:

- Hometime (U.S. TV series), the PBS home improvement television show
- Home Time, BBC2 2009 sitcom
- Hometime (single), a single by indie rock group One Eskimo
- Hometime (album), the album by British singer Alison Moyet
- Hometime (band), a Christian metalcore
- Geoff Lloyd's Hometime Show, a drivetime programme between 5PM and 8PM on Absolute Radio
- A slang term for prostitution
