= The North Ward Center =

The North Ward Center is a non-profit, community development organization in Newark, New Jersey, that serves 10,500 people annually. The center founded the Robert Treat Academy Charter School in 1997. It also runs five preschools in Newark for 680 children, Casa Israel Adult Medical Day Care Center, which serves 120 people daily, a youth leadership and recreation program that offers organized baseball, softball and basketball leagues for 2,500 youth, a Family Success Center and the Center for Autism.

== History ==
The North Ward Center was founded in 1970 by Stephen N. Adubato Sr. after the race riots in 1967 that hastened the exodus of Newark's middle class population. Originally known as the North Ward Educational and Cultural Center, its original mission was to encourage the North Ward's mostly Italian-American population to stay in Newark and provide information to residents about programs and services that were available to them through the city. But as the North Ward's population became predominantly Puerto Rican in the mid to late 1970s, the center changed its name to reflect a new mission.

The North Ward Center started operations in a small, second-floor office on Bloomfield Avenue in Newark. In 1973, it purchased the former William Clark House on Mt. Prospect Avenue, a Queen-Anne structure that had previously housed the Prospect Country and Day School. Volunteers refurbished the building, but in 1976, it was struck by lightning, causing extensive damage to the second and third floor. Once again, volunteers refurbished the building. Today, the building, which is on the National Register of Historic Places, serves as the administrative offices of the center.

== Programs ==
The North Ward Child Development Center was created in 1975. Today it serves 680 three- and four-year-old children in full-day preschool. Because Newark is an Abbott District 600 children receive free preschool while the remaining 80 are enrolled in a private preschool called Forest Hills Child Development Center.

== Leadership ==
- Stephen N. Adubato, Founder
- Michele Adubato, CEO
