= Essex Catholic High School =

Defunct Catholic high school in Newark, New Jersey, United States

Location
- 135 Glenwood Avenue; East Orange, Essex County, New Jersey

Information
- Type: Private, All-Male
- Motto: Ad Jesum Per Mariam (To Jesus Through Mary)
- Religious affiliation: Roman Catholic
- Established: 1957
- Closed: 2003
- Grades: 9-12
- Colors: Blue and Silver
- Fight song: Onward Essex
- Sports: Fencing, Football, Basketball, Cross-Country, Track & Field, Soccer, Wrestling, Baseball, Hockey, Lacrosse, Tennis, Golf
- Mascot: Eagle
- Yearbook: The Talon

Essex Catholic Boys High School (formally known as Bishop Francis Essex Catholic High School after 2000) was a four-year Catholic high school located in Newark and East Orange, in Essex County, in the U.S. state of New Jersey. The high school opened in 1957. It was run by the Congregation of Christian Brothers and sponsored by the Roman Catholic Archdiocese of Newark until its closure in 2003.

== History ==
The school's original location was at 300 Broadway in Newark. In fall 1980, the all-male school was moved to East Orange, where it took over the location of the closed all-girl's East Orange Catholic High School. It remained open at that location until June 2003 when it closed due to a lack of enrollment. Concurrent with ECHS's move to East Orange, the Archdiocese created Essex Catholic Girls High School, an all-girls Catholic high school at the former location of Archbishop Walsh Catholic High School in Irvington.

The school was supported in its early years by the efforts of the Most Reverend Thomas A. Boland, the Archbishop of Newark. In 2003, Archbishop John J. Myers agreed to close the school when the student enrollment hit a record low of 267 students in its final year, down from more than 400 five years earlier. At its peak, enrollment hovered around 3,500. In 2000, ECHS was renamed Bishop Francis Essex Catholic High School.

The area surrounding the original location went into a sharp decline following the 1967 Newark riots. The situation was further complicated by an increase in tuition in the spring of 1970 that doubled the $300 annual cost to $600 per student. The tuition increase was phased in over a period of three school years. The Class of 1971 went from $300.00 in 1970 to $400.00 in 1971. The Class of 1972 went from $300.00 in 1970 to $500.00 in 1971 and the Classes of 1973 and beyond were charged the full $600.00.

The school's 300 Broadway location is listed in the National Register of Historic Places, and had been built in 1927 as the corporate headquarters of the Mutual Benefit Life Insurance Company. The Archdiocese sold the building to a private group, which later opened a nursing facility at the location.

Following the formal closing of the school in 2003, a small group of alumni and supporters attempted to reopen a "new" Essex Catholic High School at a different location. That plan never came to fruition.

Since its closing in 2003, ECHS has maintained an active alumni association, Essex Catholic High School Foundation, Inc. Since 1982, this group has held the annual Alumni Dinner and Hall of Fame Induction, which typically attracts more than 200 alumni, faculty, family and friends. The Foundation awards scholarships to children and grandchildren of alumni. The Foundation also runs other annual fundraising events, among them the 300 Broadway Reception & Tour at the school's original location, an Alumni Golf Outing, and an All-Alumni Reunion at McGovern's Tavern in Newark, N.J. The Foundation also supports Christ the King Preparatory School, a Catholic high school in the Cristo Rey Network, located at the former Our Lady of Good Counsel High School building in Newark. Proceeds from the 300 Broadway Reception & Tour and Alumni Golf Outing go directly to CTK Prep.

== Athletics ==
The boys cross country team won the Non-Public A state championship in 1963-1967 and 1971.

The boys track team won the Non-Public indoor state championship in 1964, 1966, 1968, 1972, 1974-1976, and won the Non-Public A title in 1979. The eight state titles are the eighth most in New Jersey.

Essex Catholic had a successful fencing program under the coaching talent of Dr. Sam D'Ambola. The fencing team won the state championship from 1965-1971 (as co-winner in 1969 with Barringer High School), 1974, 1987 and 1988. The 10 team titles won ranks second-most of all schools in New Jersey, while the 15 individual titles are also the second-most statewide. Essex Catholic dominated the Dr. Gerald I. Cetrulo Memorial Tournament, winning this competition ten times: 1963, 1965 to 1971, 1974, and 1987. For two decades, Essexmen have won state titles. The Following Essex Catholic fencers have won New Jersey state individual championship titles, listing the year and the fencer- State foil title: 1965 Walter Krause, 1967 Wayne Krause, 1968 Steve Sisa, 1970 Phil Accaria, 1971 Jim Rodgers, and 1975 Brian McIntee. The state sabre title: 1965 John Lina, 1968 Bruce Soriano, 1969 Phil Reilly, 1970 Peter Westbrook, 1973 Mike Benedek, 1974 Don Krantle, 1983 Tim Byrne, and 1987 Chris Baguer. Two alumni fenced at the Olympic level in 1984: saber fencers Philip Reilly and Peter Westbrook (five-time Olympian and 1984 bronze, as well as 13-time national saber champion, and New Jersey state champion with Essex Catholic High School in his junior year), and three NCAA national champions: Walter Krause (NYU) Foil 1970; Bruce Soriano (Columbia) Sabre 1970,'71,'72; Peter Westbrook (NYU) Sabre 1973.

The boys track team won the Non-Public A spring / outdoor track state championship in 1965, 1966, 1971, 1972 (co-champion) and 1975, and won the Non-Public B title in 2003.

The baseball team won the Non-Public A North state championship in 1966 and won the Non-Public A state title in 1976, defeating Saint Anthony High School (since renamed Trenton Catholic Academy) in the tournament final. The 1976 team won the Parochial A state title with a 2-1 win against St. Anthony of Trenton, finishing the season at 25-5-1.

The boys track team won the Non-Public indoor relay championship in 1966, 1975 (as co-champion) and 1976, and won the Non-Public A title in 1979.

The boys tennis team won the Non-Public state championship in 1967 and 1968, defeating runner-up Christian Brothers Academy both years in the final match of the tournament.

The basketball team won the Non-Public A state championship in 1974 (defeating Camden Catholic High School in the tournament final), 1975 (vs. Paul VI High School) and 1977 (vs. Red Bank Catholic High School). The team won the Non-Public A title in 1975 with a 74-56 win against Paul VI High School, to finish the season with a 27-1 record.

The wrestling team won the Non-Public A North state sectional title in 1984 and 1985.

== Notable alumni ==
- Steve Adubato Jr. (born 1957), television personality, host of One on One with Steve Adubato and former member of the New Jersey General Assembly
- Rick Cerone (born 1954), former Major League Baseball catcher who played for the New York Yankees
- Ernest Dickerson (born 1951, class of 1969), film director and cinematographer
- Michael Keogh (born 1950), runner who competed in 1972 Summer Olympics
- Marty Liquori (born 1949, class of 1967), middle distance track athlete Liquori was in 1967 the second high school runner to break four minutes in the mile. He participated in the 1968 and 1972 Olympics.
- Bob Molinaro (born 1950, class of 1968), outfielder who played for eight MLB seasons with the Chicago White Sox, Baltimore Orioles, Chicago Cubs, Philadelphia Phillies and Detroit Tigers
- Mark Murro (born 1949, class of 1967), javelin thrower
- Hugh O'Neill (born 1954), retired soccer player who played professionally in the North American Soccer League, Scottish First Division, American Soccer League and Major Indoor Soccer League
- Edward R. Reilly (born 1949, class of 1967), Maryland State Senator
- Philip Reilly (born 1952), fencer who competed in the team sabre event at the 1984 Summer Olympics
- Steve Sullivan (1944-2014; class of 1963), basketball player for the Georgetown Hoyas men's basketball team and a member of the USA Basketball Gold Medal teams of the 1967 Pan-American Games and 1967 World University Games
- Peter Westbrook (1952-2024), 13-time national saber fencing champion and Olympic bronze medalist
