= WNJM =

Public radio station in New Jersey

Simulcast of WHYY-FM, Philadelphia
- Manahawkin, New Jersey; United States
- Frequency: 89.9 MHz
- Branding: WHYY

Programming
- Format: Public radio
- Affiliations: NPR; Public Radio Exchange; American Public Media

Ownership
- Owner: WHYY, Inc.

History
- First air date: August 20, 1999
- Call sign meaning: "New Jersey Manahawkin"

Technical information
- Licensing authority: FCC
- Facility ID: 48460
- Class: A
- ERP: 1 watt horizontal; 250 watts vertical
- HAAT: 79 m (259 ft)
- Transmitter coordinates: 39°41′53.4″N 74°14′4.5″W

Links
- Public license information: Public file; LMS
- Webcast: Listen live
- Website: www.whyy.org

WNJM (89.9 FM) is a radio station licensed to Manahawkin, New Jersey. The station is owned by WHYY, Inc., and simulcasts the public radio news and talk programming of WHYY-FM in Philadelphia, Pennsylvania.

== History ==
The station was formerly owned and operated by the New Jersey Network (NJN). NJN's radio network began operation May 20, 1991, when WNJT-FM in Trenton signed on. Eight other stations would be established over the following seventeen years.

On June 6, 2011, the New Jersey Public Broadcasting Authority agreed to sell five FM stations in southern New Jersey to WHYY. The transaction was announced by Governor Chris Christie, as part of his long-term goal to end State-subsidized public broadcasting. WHYY assumed control of the stations through a management agreement on July 1, 2011, pending Federal Communications Commission (FCC) approval for the acquisition; at that point, the stations began to carry the WHYY-FM schedule.
