= Taggart affair =

The Taggart affair (also known as the Sears-Taggart affair) was a political patronage scandal which occurred in 1985 during the first term of the gubernatorial administration of New Jersey Governor Thomas Kean.

== About ==
Throughout most of the twentieth century, policy in New Jersey permitted awarding county political leaders franchises which permitted them to distribute drivers’ licenses to New Jersey citizens. In 1985, New Jersey Governor Thomas Kean announced a further plan whereby citizens would additionally be able to obtain photo driver's licenses through Sears outlets. It was later confirmed that the beneficiary of the Sears contract, via a subcontract, was the owner of Taggart's Driving School and prominent Republican donor William Taggart. Ultimately, David T. Maloof, an investigative reporter for the television show NJN News, uncovered that the contract violated the Code of Ethics of the New Jersey Division of Motor Vehicles (DMV). When this was brought to the attention of the Governor's office, the Director of the DMV, Clifford Snedeker, resigned. These events led to the convening of a special session of the state legislature, an investigation by the State Commission of Investigation and a criminal investigation. New Jersey media, including the New Jersey Network, via the reporting of Mr. Maloof and others, ultimately ran many investigative reports covering the scandal. Partners of the accounting firm Price-Waterhouse later testified at a legislative hearing held by New Jersey State's Assembly Committee that the firm had received a $6.5 million no-bid contract to computerize the DMV after donating to New Jersey's State Republican Committee's Governor's Ball.

In December 1985, New Jersey Network's executive director, Hendrix F. C. Niemann, resigned citing pressure from Kean's chief of staff, Gregory C. Stevens, to step down or be fired due to the governor's dissatisfaction with the network's aggressive coverage of his administration.

Ultimately, Kean abolished the decades-long system of using political patronage in New Jersey to award contracts to distribute driver's licenses.
