= Rocky Rees =

American football player and coach (1949–2018)

Biographical details
- Born: June 9, 1949
- Died: December 20, 2018 (aged 69)

Playing career
- 1967–1970: West Chester
- Position: Running back

Coaching career (HC unless noted)
- 1971: West Chester (GA)
- 1972–1973: Newark HS (DE) (assistant)
- 1974–1976: Newark HS (DE)
- 1977–1983: Bucknell (OC)
- 1984: Colgate (assistant)
- 1985–1989: Susquehanna
- 1990–2010: Shippensburg

Head coaching record
- Overall: 159–125–2 (college)
- Tournaments: 1–1 (NCAA D-III playoffs); 1–3 (NCAA D-II playoffs)

Accomplishments and honors

Championships
- 3 MAC (1986–1987, 1989); 1 PSAC (2009); 1 PSAC Western Division (2004); 1 PSAC Eastern Division (2009)

William M. "Rocky" Rees (June 9, 1949 – December 20, 2018) was an American football player and coach. Rees served as the head football coach at Susquehanna University from 1985 to 1989 and at Shippensburg University of Pennsylvania from 1990 to 2010, compiling a career college football record of 159–125–2.

Rees grew up in Morristown, New Jersey and was captain of the football team at Bayley-Ellard High School.

== Head coaching record ==
=== College ===
Year	Team	Overall	Conference	Standing	Bowl/playoffs
Susquehanna Crusaders (Middle Atlantic Conference) (1985–1989)
1985	Susquehanna	3–7	3–6	7th	
1986	Susquehanna	11–1	9–0	1st	L NCAA Division III Quarterfinal
1987	Susquehanna	8–2	7–2	1st	
1988	Susquehanna	6–4	6–2	3rd	
1989	Susquehanna	8–1–1	7–1	1st	
Susquehanna:		36–15–1	32–11		
Shippensburg Red Raiders (Pennsylvania State Athletic Conference) (1990–2010)
1990	Shippensburg	5–6	2–4	5th (West)	
1991	Shippensburg	10–3	4–2	2nd (West)	L NCAA Division II Quarterfinal
1992	Shippensburg	3–7–1	2–3–1	4th (West)	
1993	Shippensburg	6–5	2–4	T–5th (West)	
1994	Shippensburg	5–6	2–4	T–4th (West)	
1995	Shippensburg	3–8	2–4	5th (West)	
1996	Shippensburg	3–8	2–4	5th (West)	
1997	Shippensburg	6–4	4–2	2nd (West)	
1998	Shippensburg	7–4	4–2	3rd (West)	
1999	Shippensburg	8–3	4–2	3rd (West)	
2000	Shippensburg	5–6	2–4	T–4th (West)	
2001	Shippensburg	8–3	5–1	2nd (West)	
2002	Shippensburg	6–5	4–2	T–2nd (West)	
2003	Shippensburg	8–3	4–2	3rd (West)	
2004	Shippensburg	10–2	5–1	T–1st (West)	L NCAA Division II First Round
2005	Shippensburg	4–7	2–4	5th (West)	
2006	Shippensburg	5–6	3–3	T–4th (West)	
2007	Shippensburg	3–8	2–4	5th (West)	
2008	Shippensburg	4–7	3–4	2nd (East)	
2009	Shippensburg	9–3	6–1	1st (East)	L NCAA Division II Second Round
2010	Shippensburg	5–6	3–4	5th (East)	
Shippensburg:		123–110–1	67–61–1		
Total:		159–125–2			
National championship Conference title Conference division title or championship game berth
