= Kareem Huggins =

American football player (born 1986)

No. 32
- Position: Running back

Personal information
- Born: May 24, 1986 (age 40); Irvington, New Jersey, U.S.
- Listed height: 5 ft 9 in (1.75 m)
- Listed weight: 198 lb (90 kg)

Career information
- High school: Bayley-Ellard (NJ)
- College: Hofstra
- NFL draft: 2009: undrafted

Career history
- Tampa Bay Buccaneers (2009–2010); New England Patriots (2012)*; New York Jets (2013)*; Brooklyn Bolts (2014)
- * Offseason or practice squad member only

Awards and highlights
- 2014 FXFL All-Star

Career NFL statistics
- Rushing attempts: 4
- Rushing yards: 11
- Rushing TDs: 0
- Stats at Pro Football Reference

Kareem Huggins (born May 24, 1986) is an American former professional football player who was a running back in the National Football League (NFL). He was signed by the Tampa Bay Buccaneers as an undrafted free agent in 2009. Huggins graduated from Bayley-Ellard High School in New Jersey and played college football for the Hofstra Pride.

== Professional career ==
=== Tampa Bay Buccaneers ===
He was signed by the Tampa Bay Buccaneers as an undrafted free agent prior to the 2009 season. After his September release, Huggins was signed to the Buccaneers' practice squad, where he remained until his activation to the active roster for Week 16 in December.

Huggins earned a backup running back spot in camp in 2010, but a week 6 knee injury against the New Orleans Saints ended his season, landing him on injured reserve. The severe knee injury led to the Buccaneers not tendering Huggins a contract for the 2011 season.

=== New England Patriots ===
Huggins was signed by the New England Patriots on August 4, 2012, after spending the 2011 season out of football. He was released the next day.

=== New York Jets ===
He was signed to the New York Jets' practice squad on September 25, 2013. He was released on October 2, 2013.
