= Bayley-Ellard High School =

Defunct Catholic high school in Morris County, New Jersey, US

Location
- 205 Madison Avenue; Madison, Morris County, New Jersey 07940; United States; 40.770841°N 74.432652°W

Information
- Motto: Nil sine Deo ("Nothing without God")
- Denomination: Roman Catholic
- Established: 1880
- Closed: 2005
- School district: Diocese of Paterson
- CEEB code: 310735
- Grades: 9-12
- Campus size: 26.6 acres (108,000 m^{2})
- Colors: Purple and Gold
- Team name: Bishops
- Website: bayley.org at the Wayback Machine (archive index)

Bayley-Ellard High School was a Roman Catholic high school in Madison, in Morris County, in the U.S. state of New Jersey. Established in 1880, it was one of the oldest parochial high schools in the area. The school, which was operated by the Roman Catholic Diocese of Paterson, closed in 2005 due to declining enrollment.

== History ==
The School of Our Lady of the Assumption in Morristown, New Jersey, founded by Rev. Bernard McQuid in 1850, was the forerunner of the Bayley-Ellard school. A parish grammar school, it was expanded and renamed the Bayley School in 1880 to honor Bishop James Roosevelt Bayley. A two-year business course was added to the grammar school curriculum around 1900.

Msgr. Edward Ellard introduced a four-year curriculum in 1920, making Bayley the first Catholic high school in the area. In 1948, Margaret and Susan Hawes bequeathed $100,000 toward the purchase of a new school building to be named in honor of Msgr. Ellard. The 40-acre (160,000 m^{2}) Walker Estate in Madison was purchased. The doors of Bayley-Ellard High School were opened in September 1949, making Bayley the first diocesan Catholic high school in the Paterson Diocese. The school was staffed by the Sisters of Charity, Sisters of Christian Charity, and Dominican Sisters.

It was announced the school would be closing at the end of the 2004-05 school year in May 2005.

== Campus ==
The school was sited on the former Walker Estate. Original buildings included a Colonial Revival mansion, conservatory and carriage house. Bishop's Hall, a classroom-gymnasium complex, was added in 1967, and a new sports complex consisting of football, soccer-lacrosse, baseball, and softball fields was completed later. The carriage house was demolished in 2003 and an assisted care living facility was built in roughly the same location shortly thereafter. The borough of Madison purchased the sports fields four years after the school's closing. The conservatory was demolished in approximately 2009, as a part of the conversion of the site into the Paterson Diocese's Center for Evangelization "St Paul Inside the Walls".

== Curriculum ==
Bayley-Ellard offered a college preparatory curriculum. High honors students were eligible to take courses at Fairleigh Dickinson University.

== Extracurricular activities ==
Student groups and activities at Bayley-Ellard included archeology club, art club, Big Brother/Sister, Christian Service, computer club, consumer business club, crafts club, drama club, forensics, Future Business Leaders of America, hospitality club, literary magazine, Marian Key club, mock trial, music ensemble, National Honor Society, newspaper, peer ministry, ski club, student council, Students Against Destructive Decisions, vocal ensemble, and yearbook.

== Athletics ==
The Bayley-Ellard athletic teams, known as the Bishops, competed in baseball, basketball, cheerleading, football, lacrosse, soccer, softball, tennis, wrestling, golf, cross-country and track & field. At various times, the school belonged to the Colonial Hills Conference and the Paterson Diocesan Regional League.

The football team won the Non-Public B North state championship in 1958. The Bishops Football team won their conference title during the 1986 and 1989 seasons.

The baseball team won the Non-Public B state championship in 1959 (defeating runner-up Gloucester Catholic High School), 1969 (vs. St. Mary's High School of South Amboy) and 1970 (vs. Mater Dei High School).

The 1984 softball team won the Non-Public B state title, defeating St. Joseph High School of Hammonton by a score of 9-0 in the tournament final.

The wrestling team won the Parochial B North state sectional title in 1995.

== Notable alumni ==
- Jerry Della Salla (born 1969, class of 1987), soldier who fought in the Battle of Abu Ghraib and later co-starred in the film Green Zone
- Kareem Huggins (born 1986, class of 2004), running back who played for the Tampa Bay Buccaneers
- Kent Manahan, television broadcast journalist and primetime news anchor
- Charley Molnar (born 1961, class of 1979), head football coach at the University of Massachusetts Amherst
- Sheila Pepe (born 1959), artist
- Rocky Rees (born 1949, class of 1967), head football coach at Shippensburg University of Pennsylvania from 1990 to 2010
