= Steve Sullivan (basketball) =

American basketball player

Personal information
- Born: July 20, 1946 Newark, New Jersey, U.S.
- Died: August 27, 2014 (aged 70) London, England
- Listed height: 6 ft 8 in (2.03 m)
- Listed weight: 200 lb (91 kg)

Career information
- High school: Essex Catholic (Newark, New Jersey)
- College: Georgetown (1964–1967)
- NBA draft: 1967: 2nd round, 14th overall pick
- Drafted by: Detroit Pistons
- Position: Forward
- Number: 24
- Stats at Basketball Reference

Stephen Sullivan (July 20, 1944 – August 27, 2014) was an American professional basketball player. Sullivan played collegiately for the Georgetown Hoyas men's basketball team and was the 14th overall pick in the 1967 NBA draft by the Detroit Pistons. The Pittsburgh Pipers also drafted Sullivan in the 1967 ABA Draft. Sullivan was a member of the USA Basketball gold medal teams of the 1967 Pan American Games and 1967 World University Games.

== Early life ==
Born in Newark, New Jersey and raised in East Orange, New Jersey, Sullivan attended Essex Catholic High School, graduating in 1963. He then enrolled at Georgetown University.

== College basketball career ==
Sullivan suffered a severe ankle injury and averaged only 7.1 points over 18 games in his first varsity season (1964–65) at Georgetown. In 1965–66 he led the team in scoring (15.1) and rebounding (9.7).

In 1966–67, Sullivan scored in double figures in 21 of 23 games, scored 20 or more points 10 times and averaged 18.6 points and 11.8 rebounds a game. That season, Sullivan had 33 points and 17 rebounds against American University, 26 points with 23 rebounds against Syracuse University, and had 18 points and 16 rebounds against Seton Hall in his final game. Sullivan is one of only seven Georgetown players ever to lead the team in scoring and rebounding in consecutive seasons. Sullivan graduated from Georgetown as the school's seventh all–time scorer, second all–time rebounder, and was the highest NBA draft pick to date in program history. Sullivan remained the highest Georgetown NBA pick until Sleepy Floyd was the 13th pick of the 1982 NBA draft. Both were surpassed when Patrick Ewing was the 1st overall pick of the 1985 NBA draft.

Sullivan was selected as a member of the USA Basketball gold medal teams of the 1967 Pan American Games and 1968 World University Games. The USA Team for the Pan Am Games captured the gold medal by going 9–0 with the gold medal game victory over Mexico. The 1967 World University team also won the gold medal, going 7–0 and defeating Brazil 91–38 in the gold medal game. Sullivan averaged 7.2 points in the Games. Sullivan's teammates on both squads included his future Detroit fellow draft pick Sonny Dove, Jo Jo White and Wes Unseld.

== Professional career ==
Sullivan was drafted by the ABA's Pittsburgh Pipers in the 1967 ABA Draft. Pittsburgh had just signed Connie Hawkins at power forward, so Sullivan waited for the NBA draft that summer. Selected 14th in the draft by the Detroit Pistons in an overall draft that included Earl Monroe, Pat Riley, Clem Haskins, Walt Frazier, and Phil Jackson, the Pistons had two of the first four overall picks. The Pistons drafted Jimmy Walker with the first overall pick, then drafted Sonny Dove with the 4th overall pick. The Pistons eventually opted to keep Dove on the roster over Sullivan.

Later, Sullivan spent nine years professionally playing in Italy and Spain, receiving numerous MVP awards.

== Death ==
After living and working for 45 years in Spain, Italy and England, Sullivan died in London, England, on August 27, 2014, surrounded by his family.
