= The Dinosaurs! =

1992 American television miniseries

- Genre: Documentary
- Written by: Trudi Brown & Kathy White
- Directed by: Trudi Brown & Kathy White
- Narrated by: Barbara Feldon
- Country of origin: United States
- Original language: English
- No. of series: 1
- No. of episodes: 4

Production
- Producers: Trudi Brown, Kathy White
- Running time: 56 min. per episode

Original release
- Network: PBS
- Release: November 22 – November 25, 1992

The Dinosaurs! is an American television miniseries produced by WHYY-TV for PBS in 1992, featuring some of the then-modern theories about dinosaurs and how they lived. It aired four episodes from November 22 to November 25, 1992.

== The program ==
The program features the age of dinosaurs, from the appearing of the early forms like Herrerasaurus, to the Tyrannosaurus and Ceratopsians of the late Cretaceous. The possibilities whether dinosaurs were active, warm-blooded animals, had parental care, and the theory at the time, later proved true, that they are the ancestors of birds, are featured. What caused the extinction of the non-avian dinosaurs is also discussed.

=== Episodes ===
- Part 1 - The Monsters Emerge
- Part 2 - Flesh on the Bones
- Part 3 - The Nature of the Beast
- Part 4 - The Death of the Dinosaurs

== Dinosaurs and other prehistoric animals ==
- Alioramus
- Allosaurus
- Ammonite
- Ankylosaurus
- Apatosaurus
- Archaeopteryx
- Archelon
- Barosaurus
- Baryonyx
- Brachiosaurus
- Brontosaurus
- Caenagnathus
- Camarasaurus
- Camptosaurus
- Carnotaurus
- Centrosaurus
- Ceratosaurus
- Chirostenotes
- Coelacanth (seen in the animation background in "The Death of the Dinosaurs")
- Coelophysis
- Compsognathus
- Corythosaurus
- Cryptoclidus
- Deinonychus
- Desmatosuchus
- Dilophosaurus
- Dimorphodon
- Diplodocus
- Dryosaurus
- Edmontosaurus
- Eoraptor
- Euoplocephalus
- Herrerasaurus
- Heterodontosaurus
- Hylaeosaurus
- Hypacrosaurus
- Hyperodapedon
- Hypsilophodon
- Ichthyosaurus
- Iguanodon
- Lambeosaurus
- Lesothosaurus
- Lexovisaurus
- Maiasaura
- Megalosaurus
- Microceratus
- Mixosaurus
- Mosasaurus
- Ornitholestes
- Ornithomimus
- Orodromeus
- Oviraptor
- Pachycephalosaurus
- Pachyrhinosaurus
- Parasaurolophus
- Pinacosaurus
- Plateosaurus
- Postosuchus
- Protoceratops
- Pteranodon (seen in the animation background in "Flesh on the Bones")
- Pterodactylus
- Quetzalcoatlus
- Rhamphorhynchus
- Riojasaurus
- Saltasaurus
- Saurolophus
- Saurosuchus
- Scelidosaurus
- Scolosaurus
- Scutellosaurus
- Stegosaurus
- Struthiomimus
- Styracosaurus
- Triceratops
- Troodon
- Tyrannosaurus
- Velociraptor
- Wuerhosaurus
- Xiphactinus

== Animations ==
Some animated depictions were made to give an impression of how the dinosaurs might or could have looked and how they might or would have behaved. Those animations have been featured in other media since. Some of them have been available to see in public computers at Swedish Museum of Natural History. Many of the animations have also been uploaded on YouTube.

== Home video ==
The series was released on VHS and laserdisc in 1993. The VHS edition was re-issued on November 10, 1998 with different package artwork. It was re-issued again on November 2, 1999. There have been no plans or discussions for a DVD or Blu-ray release.

== Sources ==
- https://www.amazon.com/Dinosaurs-Nature-Beast-Barbara-Feldon/dp/6303196152
- http://movies.nytimes.com/movie/189451/The-Dinosaurs-The-Nature-of-the-Beast/overview
- http://www.lddb.com/laserdisc/31515/L-PBS-1029-6/Dinosaurs!-The-%281992%29
