= WHYY-FM =

Public radio station in Philadelphia

- Philadelphia, Pennsylvania; United States
- Broadcast area: Philadelphia metropolitan area
- Frequency: 90.9 MHz (HD Radio)
- Branding: WHYY NPR

Programming
- Format: Public radio
- Affiliations: NPR; Public Radio Exchange; American Public Media

Ownership
- Owner: WHYY, Inc.
- Sister stations: WHYY-TV

History
- First air date: December 14, 1954
- Former call signs: WUHY-FM (1963–1976); WUHY (1976–1983)
- Call sign meaning: "Wider Horizons for You and Yours"

Technical information
- Licensing authority: FCC
- Facility ID: 72336
- Class: B
- ERP: 13,500 watts
- HAAT: 280 meters (920 ft)
- Transmitter coordinates: 40°2′30.4″N 75°14′22.6″W
- Repeater: See § New Jersey expansion and controversy

Links
- Public license information: Public file; LMS
- Webcast: Listen live
- Website: whyy.org/radio-podcasts/

WHYY-FM (90.9 MHz, "91 FM") is a public radio station licensed to serve Philadelphia, Pennsylvania, United States. Its broadcast tower is located in the Roxborough neighborhood while its studios and offices are located on Independence Mall in Center City Philadelphia. The station, owned by WHYY, Inc., is a charter member of NPR and contributes several programs to the national network.

== History ==
WHYY signed on the air on December 14, 1954, owned by the Metropolitan Philadelphia Educational Radio and Television Corporation. It was the first educational station in Philadelphia. The transmitter, originally located at 17th and Sansom Streets in Philadelphia, was donated by Westinghouse Broadcasting. In 1957, it added a sister television station, WHYY-TV on channel 35.

In 1963, WHYY-TV moved from channel 35 in Philadelphia to the stronger channel 12 in Wilmington, Delaware. At the time, Federal Communications Commission (FCC) regulations did not allow co-owned stations in different broadcast services to share the same base callsign if they did not have the same or adjoining city of license. Although Philadelphia and Wilmington are a single television market, then as now they are separate radio markets. As a result, the radio station was forced to change its call sign to WUHY-FM to match the renamed WUHY-TV on channel 35. The FCC removed this restriction in 1983 and the radio station was allowed to reclaim the WHYY-FM calls.

When NPR was formed in 1970, the station (then still known as WUHY-FM) became a charter member and was one of the 90 stations that carried the initial broadcast of All Things Considered.

== Programs produced ==
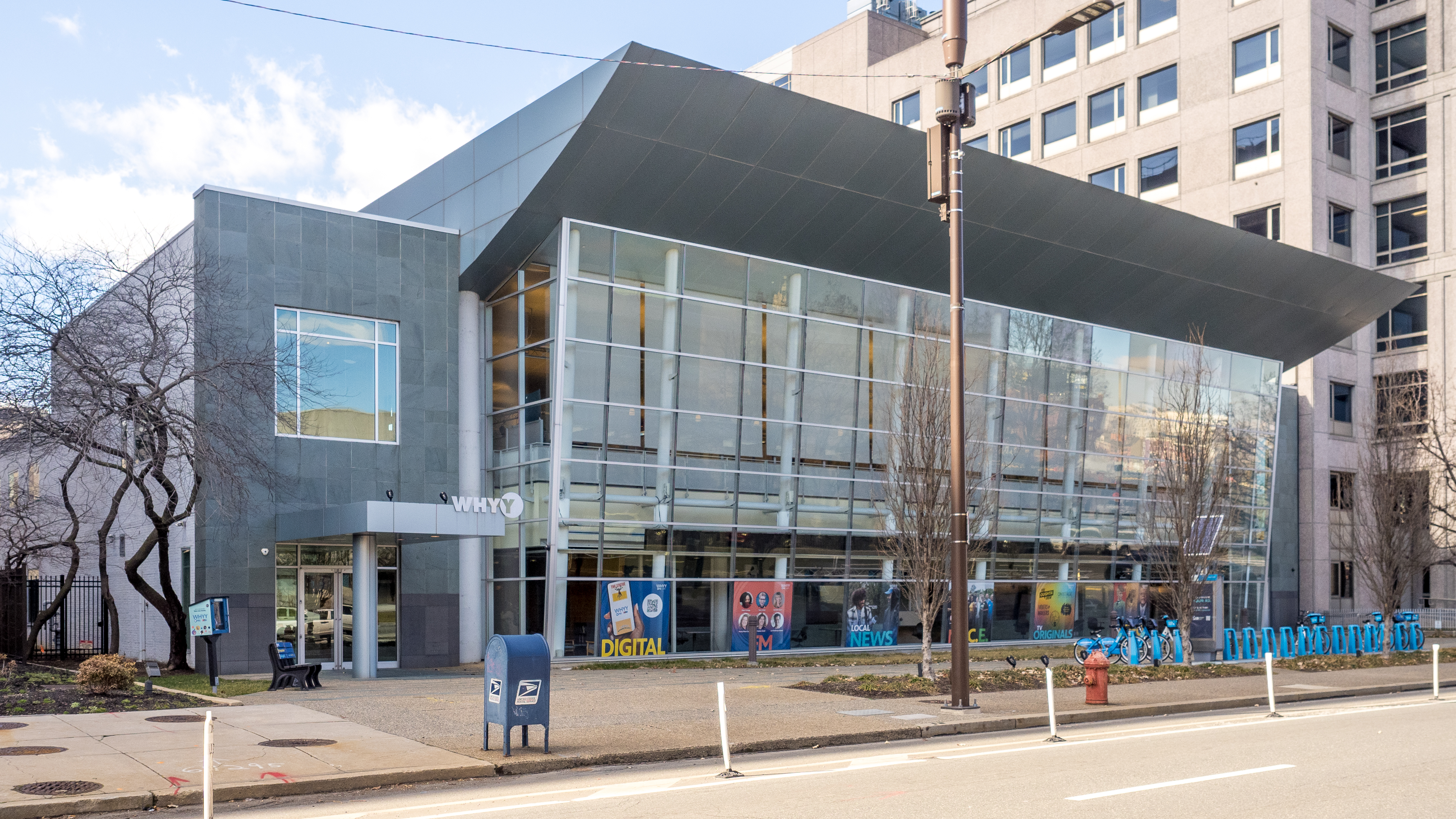
The WHYY Headquarters on 6th Street, across from Independence Mall and the National Constitution Center, in Philadelphia

Radio

- Fresh Air: A weekday radio interview program and podcast focusing on contemporary arts and issues. It is hosted by Terry Gross and Tanya Mosley. It is one of public radio's most popular programs. It is broadcast on 650 National Public Radio stations across the country, as well as in Europe on the World Radio Network. The program has received numerous accolades, including two Peabody Awards.
- The Connection with Marty Moss-Coane: A weekly interview program covering “wide-ranging conversations“ about human connection and isolation. Moss-Coane previously hosted Radio Times with Marty Moss-Coane, a daily program that followed a similar format.
- The Pulse: A program that focuses on health, science and innovation in the Philadelphia region. The show is hosted by WHYY's Behavioral Health Reporter Maiken Scott and distributed on the Public Radio Exchange.
- Studio 2: A thrice-weekly program covering local and national news in the Delaware Valley. Listeners can call-in and email during the broadcast to contribute. The show is hosted by Avi Wolfman-Arent and Cherri Greg. The program also streams live on YouTube.

Podcasts

- Hittin’ Season: A podcast that covers the Philadelphia Phillies. It is a production of Billy Penn at WHYY, a local news and lifestyle site. It is hosted by John Stolnis, Liz Roscher, and Justin Klugh.
- Art Outside: A podcast covering public art, street art, and art history in Philadelphia. Philadelphia’s public art is among the most prolific in the United States and the world. It is hosted by Conrad Benner, founder of the street art blog Streets Dept.
- Peak Travel: A podcast covering the impact of travel on local communities.
- Stop and Frisk: Revisit or Resist: A five-episode podcast covering gun violence in Philadelphia and stop-and-frisk policies. The podcast was produced by Temple University’s Logan Center for Urban Investigative Reporting.
- Eleanor Amplified: An adventure podcast following the title character, fictional radio reporter Eleanor Amplified, as she pursues leads.

== Format change ==
Until 1990, WHYY served the region as a non-commercial station with a format that featured mostly classical music with some jazz and folk music. The management decision to establish a news/talk radio format was a departure from the classical music that most public radio stations were programming. The format switch left the privately owned WFLN as the only Philadelphia classical station and resulted in protests from many of the station's listening audience who were among WHYY's major contributors. After WFLN's new owners also abandoned the classical format in the late 1990s, Temple University's WRTI (90.1 FM) began programming classical music during the day to serve the displaced listeners.

== New Jersey expansion and controversy ==
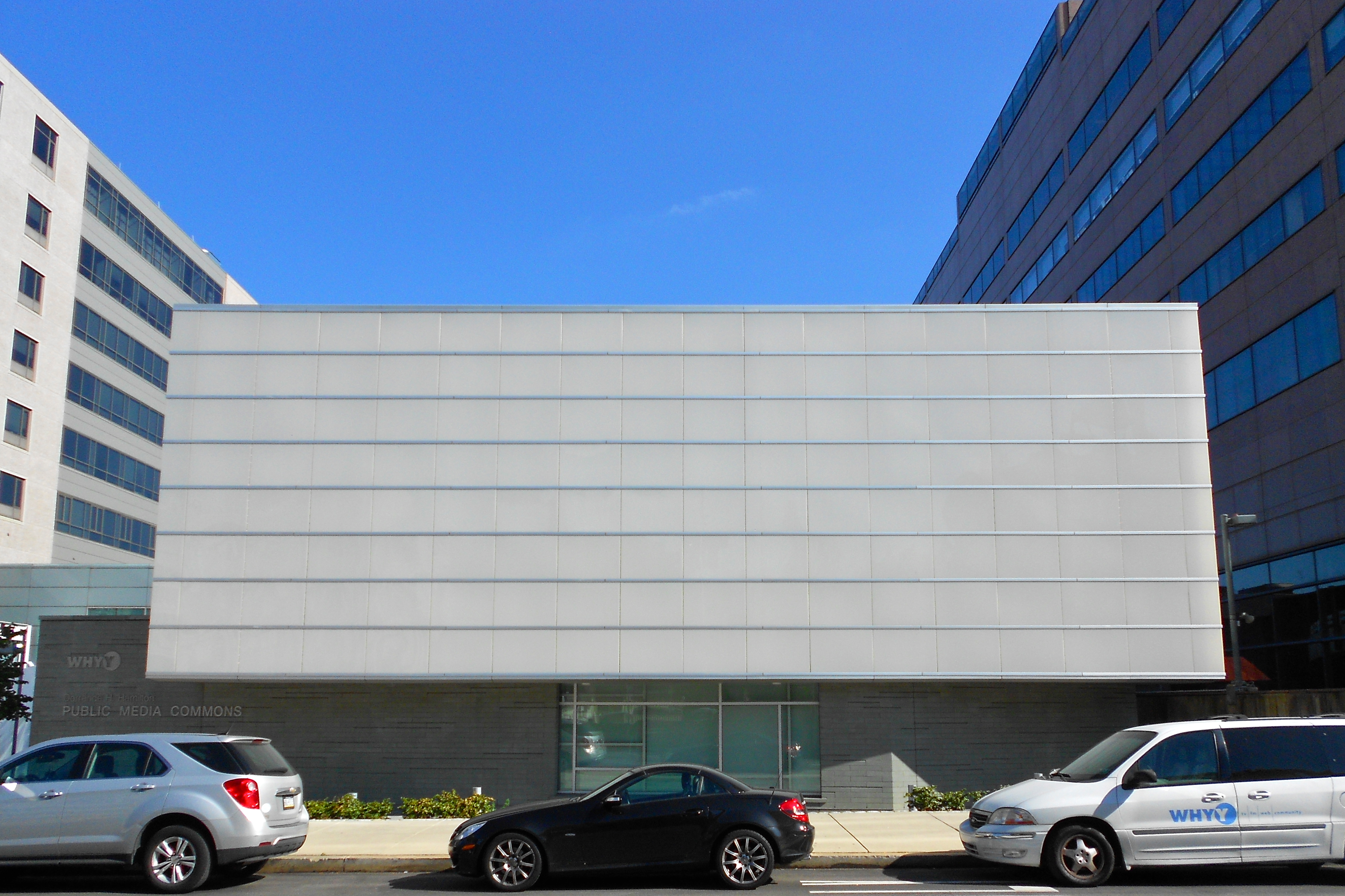
Dorrance Hamilton Media Commons, part of the WHYY building near Franklin Square

On June 6, 2011, the New Jersey Public Broadcasting Authority agreed to sell five FM stations in Southern New Jersey to WHYY. The purchase was made through an anonymous one-million dollar grant and a non-cash agreement that included scholarships for students and teachers. The five stations were previously the southern portion of the New Jersey Network's statewide radio service.

The transaction was announced by Governor Chris Christie, as part of his long-term goal to end state-subsidized public broadcasting. The governor's critics maintained that scrapping New Jersey Network effectively ended all non-commercial statewide news coverage. It was also noted that the sale eliminated a source of legislative oversight frequently critical of the Christie administration.

WHYY assumed control of the stations through a management agreement on July 1, 2011, pending FCC approval for the acquisition. At that point, the stations began to simulcast WHYY-FM programming. The five stations are:

Call sign	Frequency	City of license	FID	ERP (W)	HAAT	Class	Transmitter coordinates	FCC info
WNJB-FM (Note: WNJB-FM was sold to The Bridge of Hope, Inc., a Delaware-based nonprofit Christian radio broadcaster, and now simulcasts WKNZ.)	89.3 FM	Bridgeton, New Jersey	48934	2,500 vert 1 horiz	67 m (220 ft)	A	39°27′35.4″N 75°9′26.7″W	LMS
WNJM	89.9 FM	Manahawkin, New Jersey	48460	250 vert 1 horiz	69.5 m (228 ft)	A	39°41′53.4″N 74°14′4.5″W	LMS
WNJN-FM	89.7 FM	Atlantic City, New Jersey	48483	6,000 vert 25 horiz	84 m (276 ft)	A	39°27′40.4″N 74°41′4.5″W	LMS
WNJS-FM (Note: WNJS-FM was sold to Bux-Mont Educational Radio Association, and now simulcasts WRDV.)	88.1 FM	Berlin, New Jersey	48486	80 vert 1 horiz	287 m (942 ft)	A	39°43′41.4″N 74°50′37.6″W	LMS
WNJZ	90.3 FM	Cape May Court House, New Jersey	48464	6,000	72 m (236 ft)	A	39°06′18.4″N 74°48′4.6″W	LMS

The stations all operate at relatively low power due to the crowded state of the noncommercial end of the FM dial in the northeastern United States. They primarily serve areas of southern New Jersey not covered by the main WHYY-FM signal, which itself operates at a relatively modest 13,500 watts. However, their combined footprint extends WHYY-FM's coverage from Berks County to the Jersey Shore.

In November 2022, WHYY began to reduce its New Jersey radio footprint by announcing that it would sell WNJB-FM to non-profit Christian broadcaster, The Bridge of Hope, Inc., which owns WKNZ in Harrington, Delaware. The sale was approved by the FCC and was later completed in February 2023.

In March 2023, WHYY also announced that it would sell WNJS-FM to the Bux-Mont Educational Radio Association which owns WRDV for $110,000. The sale of the station was consummated on June 15, 2023.

== Billy Penn ==
In April 2019, WHYY acquired local news website Billy Penn. At its 2014 founding, the site was conceived as a "mobile-first" site packaging local news for millennials. The purchase was compared to New York public radio station WNYC buying the Gothamist in February 2018.

== See also ==
- WHYY-TV
