= Michael Aron (journalist) =

Michael Aron (1946 – August 13, 2024) was an American journalist. He was the senior political correspondent for New Jersey Network News. He was the host of Reporters Roundtable, a New Jersey politics program.

== Early life and education ==
Aron was a graduate of Harvard College and the Princeton School of Public and International Affairs.

== Career ==
In the 1970s, Aron worked for Rolling Stone. In March 1978, he became editor of New Jersey Monthly magazine. He was fired from the job in 1982, in part due to six libel suits. In 1984, he went to work for NJN to create five minute question and answer segments. He later went on to do reporting for the network.

In 1985, Aron moderated the New Jersey gubernatorial debate between governor Tom Kean and Peter Shapiro.

In 1994, Aron authored the book Governor's Race: A TV Reporter's Chronicle of the 1993 Florio/Whitman Campaign, which detailed the 1993 New Jersey gubernatorial election between Jim Florio and Christine Todd Whitman.

Aron retired in 2020. He was regular guest on Reporters Roundtable until his death.

== Death ==
Aron died on August 13, 2024 after a long illness at the age of 78.

== Awards and honors ==
In 2015, Aron received the Distinguished Public Service Award from the League of Municipalities. In 2021, he received the Lifetime Achievement Award in New Jersey Journalism from the Corporation for New Jersey Local Media. In February 2025, the New Jersey Society of Professional Journalists renamed its Reporter of the Year Award in honor of Aron.
