= Jerry Della Salla =

American stage and film actor (born 1969)

Gerald Anthony Della Salla (born May 7, 1969) is an American stage and film actor.

== Early years ==
Della Salla was born in Livingston, New Jersey, and was raised in East Hanover, New Jersey. A 1987 graduate of Bayley-Ellard High School, Della Salla played on the school's football team.

He studied with acting coach Stella Adler, and is a 1992 graduate of New York University's Tisch Drama Program. After graduation, he began performing in the New York theater scene, and in several Off-Broadway productions. During his early career, he shared the stage with actors such as Edward Norton, Peter Dinklage, and Philip Seymour Hoffman. In May of 1993, in a diner in the heart of Times Square NYC, he accepted Jesus Christ as his Lord and savior and became a born again Christian. From 1994 to 1995, he served as a Bible study leader at a transitionary house in the Bronx that fostered paroled juveniles, and while serving under the Redeemer Presbyterian Church headed by pastor Tim Keller.

In 2002, he enlisted in the United States Army as a response to the September 11 terrorist attacks, and deployed to Iraq as a Military Police sergeant during Operation Iraqi Freedom 3. While on tour with his unit, the 306th Military Police Battalion, he would take part in securing their base against what was then the largest attack on any US installation. Known as the Battle of Abu Ghraib, it was an offensive that lasted more than four hours. For his actions in service, Della Salla was awarded the distinguished Combat Action Badge. He continues to serve as a military advisor and consultant for studio and independent film productions in Hollywood and New York.

== Theater ==
Della Salla's first contract job was in 1995, being cast in the supporting role of Villebosse 'the Lover' in an Off-Broadway production of the Jean Anouilh dark comedy The Rehearsal, at the Beckett Theater. The play, headlined by veteran soap opera actress Fiona Hutchison, received a positive review from New York Post theater critic Clive Barnes. In 2001, Della Salla was part of the lead ensemble for the New York Times critically acclaimed Off-Broadway Showcase revival of the Sophie Treadwell classic Machinal, produced at the New Ohio Theatre in Greenwich Village. In 2004, his performance as Piero in the Manhattan premiere of Charles L. Mee's drama Big Love was described as "strong" and "debonair" by Ragged Blade online.

Della Salla made his Los Angeles stage debut in 2012, starring in a revival of the British farce What the Butler Saw, as Sergeant Match, at the Odyssey Theater Ensemble. He was also featured in the Pacific Resident Theatre 2013 production of Arthur Miller's classic A View From the Bridge. The company received nominations for Best Revival from the Los Angeles Drama Critics Circle Award and the LA Weekly. In 2016 Della Salla created the dual roles of Mafia chief Carlos Marcello and movie producer Jack Valenti in the Blank Theatre Company production of The Tragedy of JFK: as told by Wm. Shakespeare. It was produced by company co-founder Noah Wyle, and was a Los Angeles Times Critic's Pick and won several awards from broadwayworld.com.

== Television ==
In the late 1990s Della Salla began to work in television, playing guest spots on soap operas including One Life to Live and The Guiding Light. In 2002, he received the Columbia University School of the Arts Best Actor Award, for his comedic as well dramatic portrayal of small town cop Tom Sykousky, in the award-winning short film Broken. The movie would go on to screen at several film festivals, including the Woodstock Film Festival and Gen Art Film Festival, where it also won best short. The film eventually distributed to Brazilian television, under an agreement with HBO and their Independent division Hypnotic. That same year, he co-starred in the gritty New York drama Mourning Glory, opposite a cast including Bill Sage, Jon Abrahams and Michael Irby. The film won several awards including Best Directorial Debut at the 2001 New York International Independent Film and Video Festival, and a supporting actor nomination for Della Salla in the role of Rocco. In 2006 he co-starred in Personal Sergeant, a made-for-TV movie that aired on the Hallmark's Family Channel starring famed character actor Victor Argo. Currently he's the voice of Stripe the Bass, in the Allendale Christian Medias faith based cartoon: Tiny Ocean Tails.

== Film ==
Della Salla's largest role to date was in 2010, co-starring as Met-D platoon sergeant Wilkins in Universal Studios war epic Green Zone. Playing opposite Matt Damon and directed by Paul Greengrass, Della Salla cited his theater and recent military combat experience as being the overall advantage to his casting. Shortly after, he would co-star as Marine Lt. Marks in the 2013 TV One film A Christmas Blessing, with David Banner, Omari Hardwick, and Luenell. The made for cable holiday movie was directed by Russ Parr, and was shot on location in Atlanta, Georgia and Santa Clarita, CA. It airs annually during the holiday season.

In August 2018, Della Salla received a nomination for Best Actor for his lead performance in the short film Wireless, which premiered at the 168 Film Project, a Christian film festival in Hollywood, screening at the L.A. Live theater. A dark comedy, Wireless is Della Salla's story of mobster Tommy 'The Off' Dragna, who eventually comes to believe in Jesus Christ while struggling to perform a hit on a known informant. The film was recognized at the festival with a total of twelve nominations, and ultimately won two awards including Best Supporting Actress and Best 168 Film (Alumni Category). In 2023, his screenplay 'Miracle at Camp Redemption' became a Nominee for Best Script- Based on a True Story, at the prestigious International Christian Film and Music Festival of Orlando, and was a Winner for Best Screenplay at the Content Media Film Festival in Texas.

== Filmography ==
- Quick Change as Airport Traveler (1990)
- When It's Over as Drug Investor One (1997)
- Advising Michael as Josh (1997)
- One Life to Live as Rowen (3 episodes, 1997-1999)
- Guiding Light as UPS man (3 episodes, 1997-1999)
- Blue Moon as Michelle's Date (2000)
- Mourning Glory as Rocco (2001)
- Act As If as Marc (2002)
- Broken as Officer Tom Sykousky (Short, 2002)
- Personal Sergeant as Paul Manetta (2006)
- The Entrepreneurs as Frank (2008)
- Green Zone as Wilkins (2010)
- Trooper as Keith Duffy (2010)
- The Barracks as SFC Reese (2011)
- A Christmas Blessing as Marine Lt. Marks (2013)
- For Love of a Fish as Joey (2014)
- The Tragedy of JFK: (as told by Wm. Shakespeare) as Carlos Marcello/ Jack Valenti (2017)
- Wireless as Tommy 'The Off' Dragna (Short, 2018)
- Gym Rat as Officer Davis (2022)
- Benny The Barnacle as Jersey Blowfish (2022)
- Tiny Ocean Tales as Stripe The Bass (3 episodes, 2022-2023)
- Blink as K Blooey Blowfish (2022)
