= Philip Reilly =

American fencer

Personal information
- Nationality: American
- Born: Philip William Reilly; January 11, 1952 (age 74) Newark, New Jersey, United States
- Education: St. John's University, Queens, NY, Adelphi University, Garden City, New York
- Height: 5 ft 11 in (180 cm)
- Weight: 178 lb (81 kg)

Sport
- Country: USA
- Sport: Fencing
- Event: Sabre Fencing
- Club: NYAC, OFA
- Now coaching: Oregon Fencing Alliance, Portland, OR

Achievements and titles
- Olympic finals: Moscow 1980, Los Angeles 1984
- World finals: 1972 Junior World Championships, Madrid, Spain 1979 Pan American Games, San Juan PR, 1983 Pan American Games Caracas Venezuela, 1977 Hamburg, Germany, 1981 Clermont-Ferrand, France, 1982 Rome, Italy
- Regional finals: North American Sabre Champion 1981
- National finals: US National Championship finalist (top 8) 12X

Philip Reilly (born January 11, 1952) is an American fencer. He competed in the team sabre event at the 1984 Summer Olympics.

A resident of Bloomfield, New Jersey, Reilly attended Essex Catholic High School.
