= Robert Treat Academy Charter School =

Coordinates: 40.765333°N 74.172229°W

Robert Treat Academy

Location
- 443 Clifton Avenue; Newark, NJ 07104 180 William Street; Newark, NJ 07103

Information
- Opened: September 1997
- Founder: Steve Adubato Sr.
- Principal: Marcello Trillo
- Faculty: 43.2 FTEs
- Grades: K-8
- Enrollment: 681 (as of 2017–18)
- Student to teacher ratio: 15.8:1
- Website: www.roberttreatacademy.org

Robert Treat Academy Charter School is a charter school that serves students in kindergarten through eighth grade in Newark, in Essex County, New Jersey, United States. One of the initial group of 17 charter schools approved in January 1997, the school opened in September 1997 as the state's first charter school.

As of the 2017–18 school year, the district, comprising one school, had an enrollment of 681 students and 43.2 classroom teachers (on an FTE basis), for a student–teacher ratio of 15.8:1.

The sixth grade at Robert Treat Academy was one of 34 schools identified for further investigation by the New Jersey Department of Education after a pattern was identified in which larger than expected numbers of incorrect answers were erased and changed to the correct answer.

== Awards and recognition ==
During the 2008–09 school year, Robert Treat Academy Charter School was recognized with the Blue Ribbon School Award of Excellence by the United States Department of Education, and one of nine schools in the state to be selected for the school year, the highest award an American school can receive from the U.S. Education Department.

== Spending ==
Ind.	Per pupil	District spending	Rank (*)	All average	%± vs. average
1	Budgetary Cost	11,245	21	12,018	−6.4%
2	Classroom Instruction	5,672	9	6,689	−15.2%
6	Support Services	1,492	23	1,661	−10.2%
8	Administrative Cost	1,848	14	2,163	−14.6%
10	Operations & Maintenance	2,233	51	1,504	48.5%
16	Median Teacher Salary	55,400	50	46,604
Data from NJDoE 2009 Taxpayers' Guide to Education Spending. *Of All districts with any number of students. Lowest spending=1; Highest=56
