= WHYY-TV =

Television station in Wilmington, Delaware

WHYY-TV and WDPB

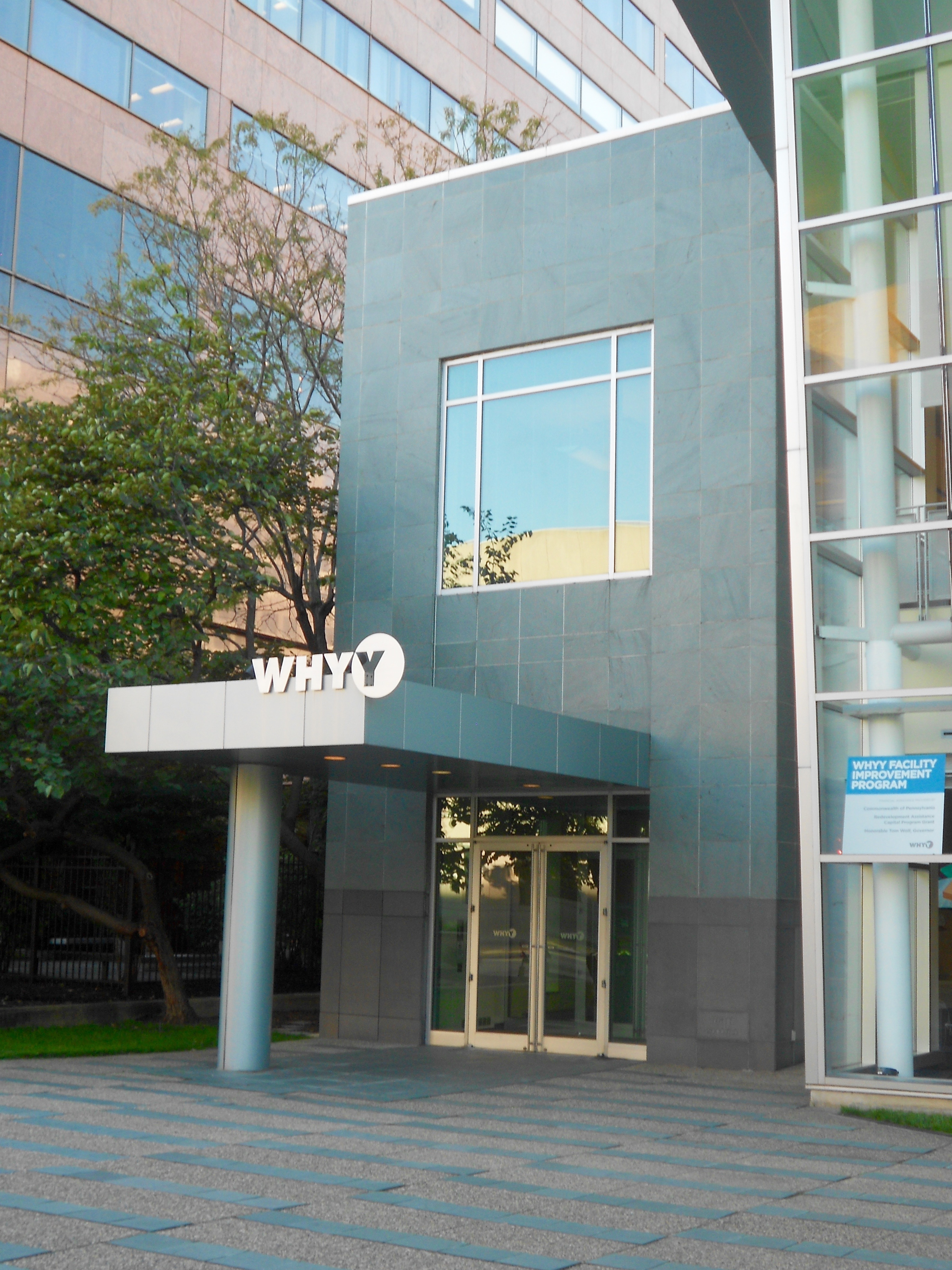
- Entrance to the WHYY building on 6th Street, across from Independence Mall and the National Constitution Center

WHYY-TV: Wilmington, Delaware; Philadelphia, Pennsylvania; WDPB: Seaford–Dover, Delaware; United States
- Channels for WHYY-TV: Digital: 13 (VHF), shared with WMCN-TV; Virtual: 12
- Channels for WDPB: Digital: 24 (UHF); Virtual: 64
- Branding: PBS WHYY

Programming
- Affiliations: 12.1/64.1: PBS; for others, see § Technical information and subchannels

Ownership
- Owner: WHYY, Inc.
- Sister stations: WHYY-FM

History
- First air date: WHYY-TV: September 16, 1957; WDPB: December 4, 1981
- Former channel number: WHYY-TV: Analog: 35 (UHF, 1957–1963), (Note: Channel 35 continued to operate as a secondary station, WUHY-TV, from 1963 to 1976.) 12 (VHF, 1963–2009); Digital: 55 (UHF, 1999–2009), 12 (VHF, 2009–2020); WDPB: Analog: 64 (UHF, 1981–2009); Digital: 44 (UHF, 2005–2019)
- Former affiliations: WHYY-TV: NET (1957–1970)
- Call sign meaning: WHYY-TV: "Wider Horizons for You and Yours"; WDPB: Delaware Public Broadcasting

Technical information
- Licensing authority: FCC
- Facility ID: WHYY-TV: 72338; WDPB: 72335
- ERP: WHYY-TV: 30 kW; WDPB: 65.2 kW
- HAAT: WHYY-TV: 294 m (965 ft); WDPB: 195 m (640 ft)
- Transmitter coordinates: WHYY-TV: 40°2′30.9″N 75°14′21.9″W; WDPB: 38°39′16″N 75°36′39″W

Links
- Public license information: WHYY-TV: Public file; LMS; WDPB: Public file; LMS
- Website: www.whyy.org

WHYY-TV (channel 12) is a television station licensed to Wilmington, Delaware, United States, serving as the primary PBS member station for the Philadelphia area. It is owned by WHYY, Inc., alongside NPR member WHYY-FM (90.9). WHYY-TV and WHYY-FM share studios and offices on Independence Mall in Center City, Philadelphia, with an additional office in Wilmington; through a channel sharing agreement with WMCN-TV (channel 44), the two stations transmit using WHYY-TV's spectrum from an antenna in Philadelphia's Roxborough section.

WHYY-TV is one of four PBS member stations serving the Philadelphia market, alongside Philadelphia-licensed WPPT (channel 35), Allentown-based WLVT-TV (channel 39), and NJ PBS (WNJS, channel 23, and WNJT, channel 52). In southern Delaware and on the Delmarva Peninsula, WHYY-TV is seen on WDPB (channel 64), a full-time rebroadcaster in Seaford, Delaware.

WHYY-TV was established in 1957 on channel 35 in Philadelphia as the first educational TV station in the city. Seeking to expand its coverage area, it successfully filed to use channel 12 in Wilmington, which was left vacant after the closing of a commercial station, and moved its primary programming there in 1963. It also opened a Wilmington studio and began producing Delaware-oriented public affairs programming.

== History ==
=== The channel 35 years ===
In May 1951, Philadelphia's Board of Education first considered the idea of asking for an educational television channel, either Philadelphia's 35 in the newly created UHF band or the channel 12 allocation at Wilmington, for use by the city schools and other organizations. A $150,000 grant from the Ford Foundation was received in 1953, when the Delaware Valley Educational Television Corporation was chartered and filed for channel 35. A year later, the Philadelphia Educational Radio Corporation, a consortium of schools and colleges, launched WHYY (90.9 FM), the city's first noncommercial radio service, on December 15, 1954.

With WHYY radio in operation, the focus shifted to giving birth to WHYY television. After the organization changed its name to the Metropolitan Philadelphia Educational Radio and Television Corporation, it received a construction permit in March 1956 for a station on UHF channel 35, the designated educational television channel for the city. That April, WHYY negotiated a five-year lease of the former WCAU-TV studios at 1622 Chestnut Street. Plans called for a weekly output of 25 hours of programming. The station appeared ready to go on November 26, 1956. Twelve city schools were being equipped with UHF-capable sets to receive the programs; a two-page feature entitled "This Is WHYY" ran in a late October edition of The Philadelphia Inquirer Magazine; and test patterns were being broadcast. However, an unexpected snag emerged between station management and the school board. It had committed $100,000 to finance the station but instead opted to give only $75,000, diverting the remainder to a management study of the new outlet by a New York firm. The school board wanted control to be based on financial contributions, which would have given it more power in station decision-making, and there were also concerns that the UHF station would suffer from the inability of all television sets to tune that band (as television sets were not required to include UHF tuning until the All-Channel Receiver Act took effect in 1964).

The school board's decision set WHYY-TV back nearly a year; after an agreement was reached to reorganize the board of directors and for the chairman and president of WHYY to present their resignations, the last obstacle was removed in February, with the station finally debuting on September 16, 1957. Six months after start-up, the first nighttime programs were presented by the station to complement daytime instructional output.

=== The fight for channel 12 ===
WHYY-TV had been on the air in Philadelphia for a year when events further down the Delaware River transpired that would have a major effect on the young station. Channel 12 in Wilmington had been occupied by WVUE, a commercial station. WVUE closed in September 1958, a casualty of ownership complications and financial losses, and within a week of its shutdown, committees involving Pennsylvania, Delaware, and New Jersey legislators were formed to study the feasibility of procuring channel 12 for regional educational broadcasting use while maintaining channel 35.

WHYY was not the only entity interested in channel 12. Other applicants also filed for authority to build it as a commercial station. As Delaware groups marshaled a demonstration in Washington in support of designating the VHF channel for educational use, the FCC convened hearings with WHYY and four commercial applicants to start in October 1960, then delayed into 1961.

The four commercial applicants each had configurations of television experience and political backing. Metropolitan Broadcasting (renamed Metromedia in April 1961), owner of independent television stations in Washington (WTTG) and New York City (WNEW-TV) as well as Philadelphia's WIP radio, had taken an option on a $185,000 parcel of land in Wilmington for potential facilities. National Telefilm Associates, another owner of a New York City-area station (WNTA-TV); locally based Rollins Broadcasting, owned by former lieutenant governor John W. Rollins and his brother O. Wayne Rollins and owner of Wilmington radio station WAMS (1380 AM); and Wilmington Television, a private firm owned by primarily Midwest backers led by Egmont Sonderling, were also in the running. National Telefilm and Wilmington Television bowed out in February 1961, leaving Metropolitan, Rollins, and WHYY. Just as oral hearings finally commenced in October, Metromedia unexpectedly withdrew despite having prepared voluminous exhibits and materials in support of its case; no reason was given.

With the fight having been winnowed to two, oral hearing centered around program proposals and Rollins's record as a broadcaster with WAMS, which WHYY charged to be poor. Rollins attacked WHYY for leading a letter-writing campaign to the FCC that constituted illegal ex parte communications to the commission. WHYY contended Wilmington had enough commercial service from Philadelphia, Baltimore, and Salisbury, Maryland, stations; Rollins believed Delaware could support a commercial station with a strong public service component, claiming WHYY was dominated by Philadelphia interests.

It took months for FCC hearing examiner Walther Guenther to render an initial decision, which Delaware's U.S. representative, Harris McDowell, criticized as a product of a slow comparative hearing process. The decision, handed down in late September, awarded the channel to WHYY. Guenther found that, although WAMS operated in the public interest, there was a "distinctly greater need" for a VHF educational TV channel than for another commercial service; he favored WHYY on diversity of media ownership over Rollins's nine radio and three television stations but Rollins on its ability to air paid political programming and its familiarity with the area. Instead of appealing, Rollins withdrew on November 13, 1962, paving the way for WHYY to win a channel 12 construction permit on December 26.

=== Expanding to Wilmington and growth in Philadelphia ===
After Rollins dropped out, WHYY began planning for the needed physical plant to activate the channel. It announced it would be a two-city operation with studios in Wilmington and Philadelphia, having already obtained an option on land for a transmitter site at Glassboro, New Jersey, from where WVUE had broadcast. The move in total would cost $1.1 million. Wilmington studios were built in the former Frederick Douglass Elementary School at Fifth and Scott streets, which closed in the 1950s when Wilmington desegregated.

The WHYY-TV call letters moved to the channel 12 construction permit in March 1963. That necessitated the UHF station—which would be retained to provide secondary and specialized service—to adopt a new call sign, WUHY-TV, and because the FCC did not permit at that time that broadcast stations with different cities of license could share a base call sign, the Philadelphia radio station also changed to WUHY.

After five years of silence, channel 12 from Wilmington came alive with WHYY-TV on September 12, 1963, expanding its reach to viewers without UHF converters in the Delaware Valley. The in-school programming that had been used for years in Philadelphia schools made its way into 23 school districts in Delaware. In January 1964, the WHYY Philadelphia studios relocated to the former WFIL radio and television facilities at 46th and Market streets after Triangle Publications, the owner of WFIL radio and television, gifted the building and equipment to WHYY as the commercial stations moved to a site on City Line Avenue. National Educational Television, the original public television network to which WHYY had belonged since the late 1950s, was replaced with PBS in October 1970.

In 1971, WHYY-TV relocated its transmitter from Glassboro to the Roxborough tower farm where other Philadelphia stations are located. WUHY-TV remained in service providing alternate programming—including the only on-air preview of Sesame Street before its national debut, a week-long run starting on July 21, 1969—until August 1976, when WHYY surrendered its license. (Note: WUHY radio continued to use that call sign until January 31, 1983, when the WHYY call sign was restored.) Despite this, the station had a low profile on the network relative to the market it served. Its ties to cultural institutions in the city were weak, and its contributions to the network were poor. In a 1976 feature article in The Philadelphia Inquirer magazine that declared WHYY-TV "an experiment in mediocrity", one PBS executive, H. David Lacey, noted that "WHYY's credibility is about as high as a gnat's behind". The station was slow to attract underwriters; took a passive role in broadcasting local cultural programming, often at the suggestion of other groups; and lacked recognized output.

The city of Philadelphia turned over the $13 million Living History Center, a museum opened for the bicentennial in 1976, to WHYY in 1978, and the stations' operations moved there in phases from 1979 to 1981: administration in February 1979, radio in August 1980 (using the center's former cafeteria), and television production and transmission in late 1981. The facility is still used by WHYY radio and television today; it was renovated in 1999, with a new glass façade and open-plan studio.

=== Public TV goes south ===
Residents of southern Delaware, however, did not receive full service from the Wilmington station. In 1980, the Delaware Citizens' Committee announced it would build a translator for WHYY-TV in Seaford, to make it available in that area. The group had been formed to bring a commercial station to southern Delaware; in 1978, Seaford's channel 38 assignment was changed to commercial and a noncommercial reserved channel 64 added. At that time, the only PBS cable service for households in that area was WCPB, the Maryland Public Television transmitter at Salisbury. A final contract was issued in November 1980 to build the 1,000-watt rebroadcaster atop a tower in Sharptown, Maryland.

To augment the service and ensure cable companies picked it up instead of bypassing the translator for WHYY-TV's feed, the Citizens' Committee applied in January 1981 for a full-service license, activating it that December 4 as WDPB. WDPB operated independently of WHYY-TV, paying for its own PBS national programs and producing a limited number of local shows focusing on southern Delaware. Plans were revealed in 1982 to relocate the translator setup to Dover and replace it in Seaford with a 5,000-watt facility. However, tiny WDPB had a precarious independent existence. In December 1982, the home on Seaford's Front Street that it was leasing as a studio facility was put on the auction block; the station was unaware until a receptionist spotted a classified advertisement. WDPB moved to another former home on the edge of town, and in 1984, it boosted its effective radiated power to 75,000 watts.

WHYY-TV logo used from 2000 to mid-November 2019.

In November 1985, a decision by the Bicentennial Community Improvement Committee, created to support projects around Delaware's 200th anniversary of statehood in 1987, not to award a grant to WDPB to buy equipment left the station unable to obtain Corporation for Public Broadcasting matching funds and meet its own financial commitments, putting channel 64 close to going off the air. Two months earlier, WDPB's only local programs had gone off the air for lack of money; its most successful fund drive in station history had only raised $5,000. WHYY stepped in to save the station and run it on an interim basis while it worked through acquiring it outright. FCC approval for the purchase was obtained in March 1986, at which time WDPB viewers began seeing all of WHYY-TV's programming.

=== The 1990s and beyond ===
In 1997, Rick Breitenfeld, who had led WHYY for 14 years and oversaw a doubling of its TV viewership, retired. Former Philadelphia city water commissioner William J. Marrazzo was named president of WHYY, envisioning an organization that would take advantage of digital multicasting and produce top-quality programs. Renovated studios, dubbed the Technology Center, opened in 1999.

While the station began to turn surpluses and tripled its number of major donors, Marrazzo's high compensation raised questions from staff and charity groups. His fiscal year 2007 compensation of $740,090 exceeded that of his counterparts at WNET and WGBH, which had multiple times the revenue of WHYY, as well as the chief executives of PBS and NPR itself. Charity Navigator put Marrazzo on its list of "10 Highly Paid CEOs at Low-Rated Charities". Employees wrote a letter to Marrazzo advising of the "growing negative climate" and "low morale" he had fostered and calling for his resignation. An article in Philadelphia magazine declared that "unlike top-flight PBS stations, it produces no regular national TV programming and hardly any local programming of note".

In 2019, WHYY employees voted to unionize, approving their first contract two years later.

== Programs produced by WHYY ==
WHYY-TV has long been a producer of PBS programming, though not to the same degree as some large-market PBS stations. At one point in the 1970s, WHYY-TV's lone contribution to the network was the public affairs program Black Perspective on the News; however, by the start of the 1990s, WHYY was the eighth-largest supplier of program hours to PBS. Other WHYY-TV productions aired nationally have included Hometime, which ran for 30 years from 1986 to 2016; Neptune All Night, a 9-hour live TV special that aired in 1989 as Voyager 2 passed Neptune and its largest moon, Triton; The Dinosaurs! (1992), which was characterized as the station's entry into big-budget production but marked by funding issues, delays, and the firing of its producer, Robin Bates, who called WHYY a "tin-pot station"; and Scenes from Modern Life (2002). The station launched Albie's Elevator locally on WHYY-TV and nationally via YouTube in June 2023.

Additionally, the station's old Independence Mall studios served as the original home of Nickelodeon's game shows, including Double Dare, Family Double Dare, and Finders Keepers; more than 500 episodes of five different game shows were taped by Nickelodeon at WHYY from 1986 to 1989, along with the 1992–93 Bill Cosby iteration of You Bet Your Life.

=== Delaware programming ===
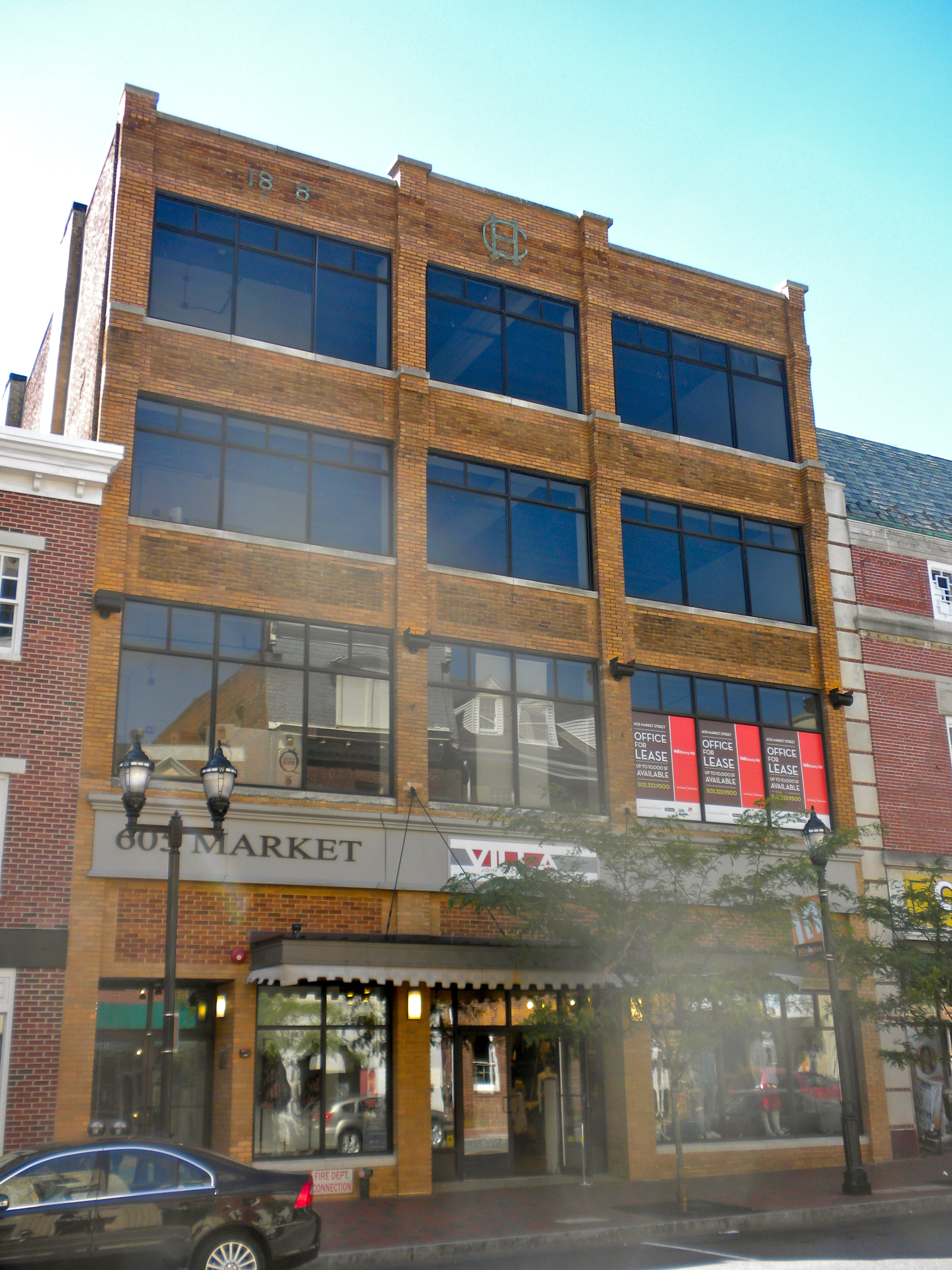
The historic Crosby and Hill Building in downtown Wilmington has housed WHYY's Delaware broadcast center since 2019

Since channel 12's move to Wilmington in 1963, the production of programming catering to Delaware interests has been part of the station's remit. For 46 years, the station ran a nightly news program, under various names and in various time slots, starting with Delaware Tonight, which began production when channel 12 was activated.

The program had previously aired under multiple titles and formats, including Today in Delaware and TV 12 News, with Delaware Tonight used during two distinct periods: 1963–1972 and 2000–2009.

The Great Recession brought funding and budget cuts that led to a dramatic restructuring and slimming down of Wilmington operations. In June 2009, it announced Delaware Tonight would be canceled after 46 years in production under various titles, to be replaced with a weekly program titled First and expanded online news coverage. It also closed a Dover bureau it had opened just two years prior and put the Linden Building facility on the market, calling it expensive to operate.

The cuts led to blowback from many corners of Delaware politics and media. Longtime The News Journal columnist Harry Themal declared in a column that "WHYY doesn't care about Delaware". In December, the city of Wilmington filed a petition to deny WHYY-TV's license renewal as a leverage move; the protest was denied in 2010. Senator Ted Kaufman, who had served on the public broadcaster's advisory board, delivered a speech on the floor of the United States Senate calling on the FCC to require more Delaware coverage as a condition of renewal.

In 2019, WHYY's Wilmington operations moved from the Linden Building to space in the historic Crosby and Hill Building on Market Street in the city's LoMa district. The building houses a newsroom and radio recording studios but no television studios, with those facilities being maintained exclusively in Philadelphia.

=== Local programming ===
Current WHYY local programming includes a local version of the Check, Please! franchise, Check, Please! Philly, reviewing restaurants in the Philadelphia region; arts and culture profile program Movers & Makers; and local feature magazine You Oughta Know.

== Technical information and subchannels ==
=== WHYY-TV subchannels ===
WHYY-TV and WMCN-TV broadcast from a transmitter facility in the Roxborough section of Philadelphia.

Subchannels of WHYY-TV and WMCN-TV
License	Subchannel	Res.	Short name	Programming
WHYY-TV	12.1	1080i	WHYY	PBS
WHYY-TV	12.2	480i	WHYY2	Y2 (5 a.m.–5 p.m.); World (5 p.m.–5 a.m.)
WHYY-TV	12.3	480i	YKids	PBS Kids
WMCN-TV	44.1	720p	WMCN-TV	Infomercials
WMCN-TV	44.2	480i	The 365	365BLK (4:3)
WMCN-TV	44.3	480i	Outlaw	Outlaw (4:3)
WMCN-TV	44.4	480i	MovGold	MovieSphere Gold (4:3)

=== WDPB subchannels ===
WDPB broadcasts the same WHYY-TV subchannels from its transmitter in Seaford:

Subchannels of WDPB
Subchannel	Res.	Short name	Programming
64.1	1080i	WDPB	PBS
64.2	480i	WHYY2	Y2 (5 a.m.–5 p.m.); World (5 p.m.–5 a.m.)
64.3	480i	YKids	PBS Kids

=== Analog-to-digital conversion ===
WHYY-TV's digital signal initially operated at so low an effective radiated power that even those who lived in some areas of the city of Philadelphia could not receive it reliably. The station shut down its analog signal, over VHF channel 12, on June 12, 2009, the official date on which full-power television stations in the United States transitioned from analog to digital broadcasts under federal mandate. The station's digital signal relocated from its pre-transition UHF channel 55, which was among the high band UHF channels (52–69) that were removed from broadcasting use as a result of the transition, to VHF channel 12 for post-transition operations. After problems with VHF digital signals emerged, WHYY was permitted to increase its transmitting power upon the transition. However, the problems with digital broadcasts in the VHF spectrum remain the same at the increased power level and still prevent many people in the Philadelphia area from being able to view the high-band VHF signal of WHYY—especially when also attempting to view WPVI-TV (channel 6), a low-band VHF station that requires a different antenna configuration.

The WHYY-TV/WMCN multiplex was repacked to channel 13 in the tenth and final phase of the repack in 2020.

== See also ==
- WHYY-FM
- List of television stations in Delaware
- List of television stations in Pennsylvania
