= Hometime (American TV series) =

Home improvement TV program

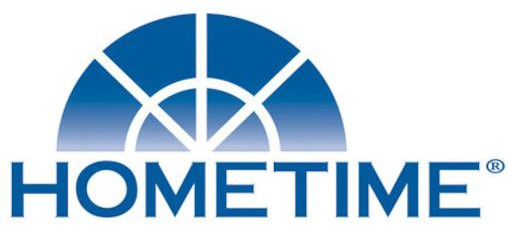
- Real People, Real Projects.
- Created by: Dean Johnson
- Starring: Dean Johnson; Peggy Knapp (1986–1987); JoAnne Liebeler (1987–1992); Susanne Egli (1992–1993); Robin Hartl (1993–2005); Miriam Johnson (2005–2016)
- Theme music composer: Red Gallagher
- Country of origin: United States
- Original language: English
- No. of seasons: 29

Production
- Executive producer: Dean Johnson
- Production location: Chaska, Minnesota
- Running time: 30 minutes

Original release
- Network: PBS
- Release: November 1, 1986 – January 30, 2016

Hometime is an American PBS home improvement television program. It aired from November 1, 1986, to January 30, 2016. Hometime was broadcast on public television and in syndication.

Hometime was produced by Hometime Video Publishing of Chaska, Minnesota, in association with WHYY-TV—Wilmington/Philadelphia. In 1987, Hometime Video Publishing set up a duplication arm, The Duplication Factory, to produce videotapes of the program for home release.

Hometime demonstrates both do-it-yourself- and contractor-performed projects, ranging from simple weekend projects to complete homes. Hometime episodes have covered many aspects of home construction and maintenance.

== Hosts ==
Although Dean Johnson has continuously hosted Hometime since its inception, there have been five co-hosts and one tri-co-host:

- Peggy Knapp co-hosted Hometime from 1986 to 1987.
- JoAnne "JoJo" Liebeler co-hosted the program from 1987 to 1992. She later hosted and produced her own shows: Room for Change (1995–2002) on HGTV, Home Savvy (1996–2001) on TLC, and Passport to Design (2002–2005) on Travel Channel. Liebeler is now the president of her own production company (2×4 Productions) and returned as a guest on Hometime for projects in October 2006, December 2009, September 2010 and a sunroom project in November 2013.
- Susanne Egli co-hosted the program from 1992 to 1993.
- Robin Hartl co-hosted Hometime from 1993 to 2005. She has appeared in infomercials for the Little Giant Ladder with actor Richard Karn and the Worx GT lawn trimmer and edger. Hartl now works in the Twin Cities at the Anoka Design Studio as an American Society of Interior Designers (ASID) designer who helps builders and their clients choose designs and finish materials for new house, room addition, and similar construction projects.
- Miriam Johnson co-hosted Hometime from 2005 until the end of the series in 2016. She hosted through her pregnancy with daughter Sula Catherine. Johnson and her husband, Paul, finished an extensive renovation of their 80-year-old home. Miriam is now a real estate agent with Coldwell Banker Burnet in the Twin Cities.
