= Steve Adubato Jr. =

American politician (born 1957)

Stephen N. Adubato Jr.
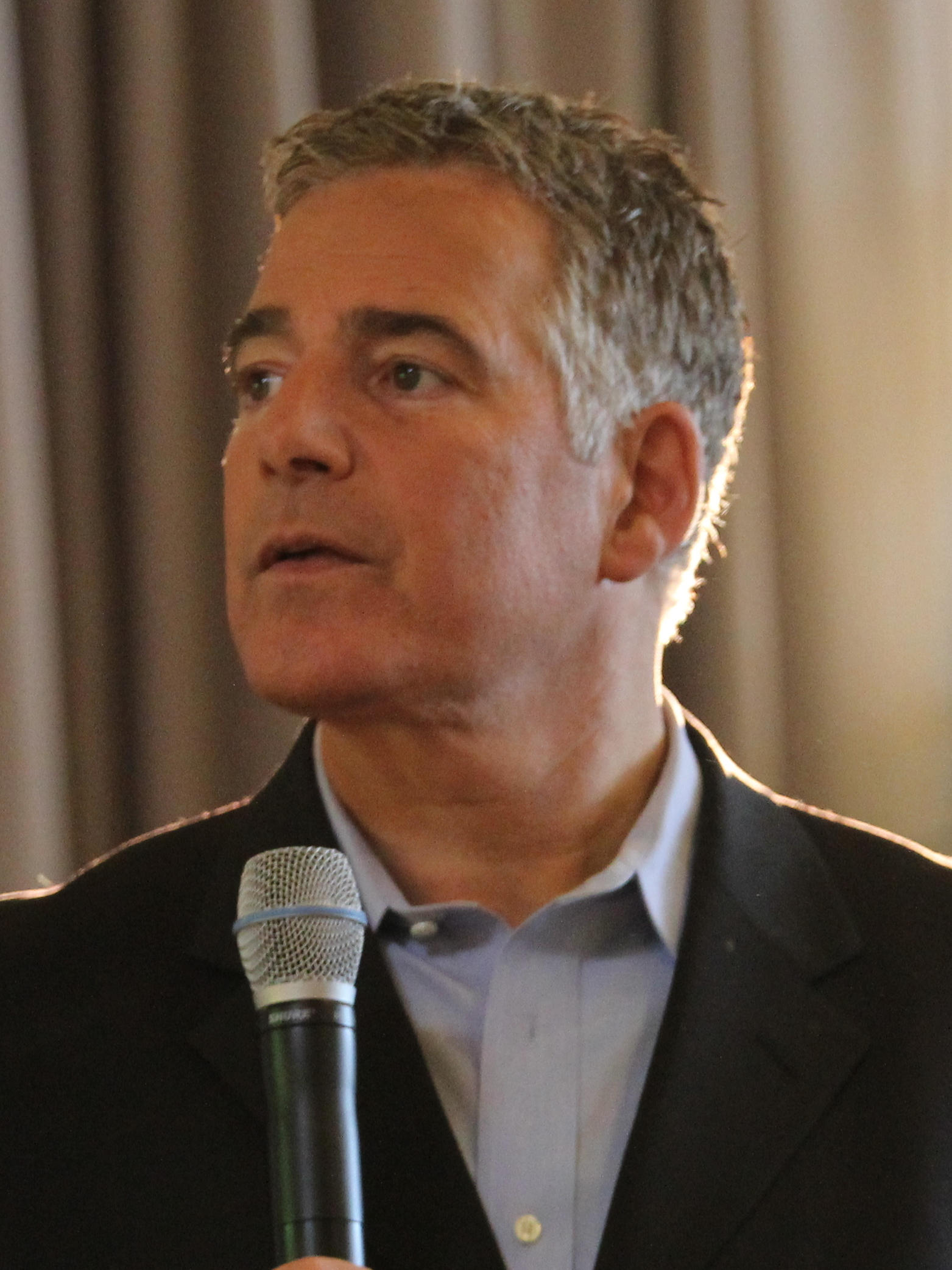
- Adubato in 2015

Member of the New Jersey General Assembly from the 30th district
- In office January 10, 1984 – January 14, 1986 Serving with Buddy Fortunato
- Preceded by: John V. Kelly
- Succeeded by: Marion Crecco; John V. Kelly

Personal details
- Born: Stephen N. Adubato Jr. Newark, New Jersey, U.S.
- Party: Democratic
- Spouse: Jennifer Adubato
- Children: 4
- Parent: Steve Adubato Sr. (father)
- Relatives: Michael F. Adubato (uncle); Richie Adubato (cousin)
- Education: Rutgers University
- Occupation: Academic, author, political analyst and television news anchor
- Committees: President, Caucus Educational Corporation

Steve Adubato is an American television broadcaster, author and university lecturer. In the mid 1980s he was New Jersey's youngest state legislator in the New Jersey General Assembly at age 26. Adubato holds a doctorate from Rutgers University in the field of mass media and communication. He is the author of six books.

== Early life and education ==
Adubato, born in and a native of Newark, graduated from Essex Catholic High School, which he described as having "high academic standards despite being in one of the worst sections of the city". He earned his master's degree from Rutgers and later a Doctor of Philosophy degree in mass communication from Rutgers. He was elected to the New Jersey General Assembly in 1984 with the support of his father, Steve Adubato Sr., a New Jersey Democratic politician, making him New Jersey’s youngest state legislator at the age of 26. However, he lost re-election in 1985.

== Career ==
Adubato is a broadcaster with the PBS affiliates in the New York/New Jersey/Philadelphia region. He is also a "distinguished visiting professor" at Seton Hall University, Rowan University and has lectured at Rutgers, NJIT as well as NYU, Montclair State University, Caldwell University and West Point.

In 1994, Adubato, along with a group of broadcasting entrepreneurs founded the Caucus Educational Corporation (CEC), to produce public affairs programs. The company had produced content on New Jersey public affairs for websites such as NJ.com, BestofNJ.com, and others. In 2011, after NJN was privatized, the CEC produced programs for its successor, NJTV along with its sister station, WNET. Since 2011, Adubato remains the host of three of the four CEC produced programs, including Caucus New Jersey with Steve Adubato, State of Affairs and One on One with Steve Adubato, and Remember Them with Steve Adubato and Jacqui Tricarico, much of which is aired on NJTV, WNET, News12+, along with FiOS1 New Jersey (which later closed in 2019), WHYY-TV and on Classical Station WQXR-FM. New Jersey Capital Report ended its run in 2017 and was replaced with State of Affairs by March 2017. In addition to hosting the aforementioned programs, he also appeared on the Today Show, CNN, FOX News and WNYW as a media and political analyst. Adubato also appears regularly on New York City talk radio stations WABC-AM 770 and WNYM AM 970 as well as Sirius XM Satellite Radio.

In 1999, Adubato founded a not-for-profit version of his firm called Stand & Deliver: Communication Tools for Tomorrow's Leaders. The program provides communication and leadership skills training to young people in the greater Newark, New Jersey, area. Annually, the program provides over 500 young adults with the tools they need to become better citizens and to more effectively compete for and succeed in future employment.

=== Books ===
Adubato is the author of the non-fiction book Speak from the Heart – Be Yourself and Get Results published by Simon & Schuster. It was featured in Fortune magazine. He also wrote Make the Connection – Improve Your Communication at Work and at Home (Rutgers University Press) and What Were They Thinking? Crisis Communication: The Good, the Bad and the Totally Clueless which examines highly publicized and often controversial public relations and media mishaps. His fourth book, YOU Are the Brand! provides tips, strategies and tools aimed at helping people succeed. His fifth book, titled Lessons in Leadership, teaches readers to be self-aware, empathetic, and more effective leaders at work and at home. His sixth book, Lessons in Leadership 2.0: The Tough Stuff, was published in 2023.

=== Accolades ===
He has received four Emmy Awards. In 1995, 2000 and again in 2001, the Mid-Atlantic Chapter of the National Academy of Television Arts and Sciences presented Adubato with Emmy Awards in the category of "Best Host".
