= Crosby and Hill Building =

- U.S. National Register of Historic Places
- U.S. Historic district – Contributing property
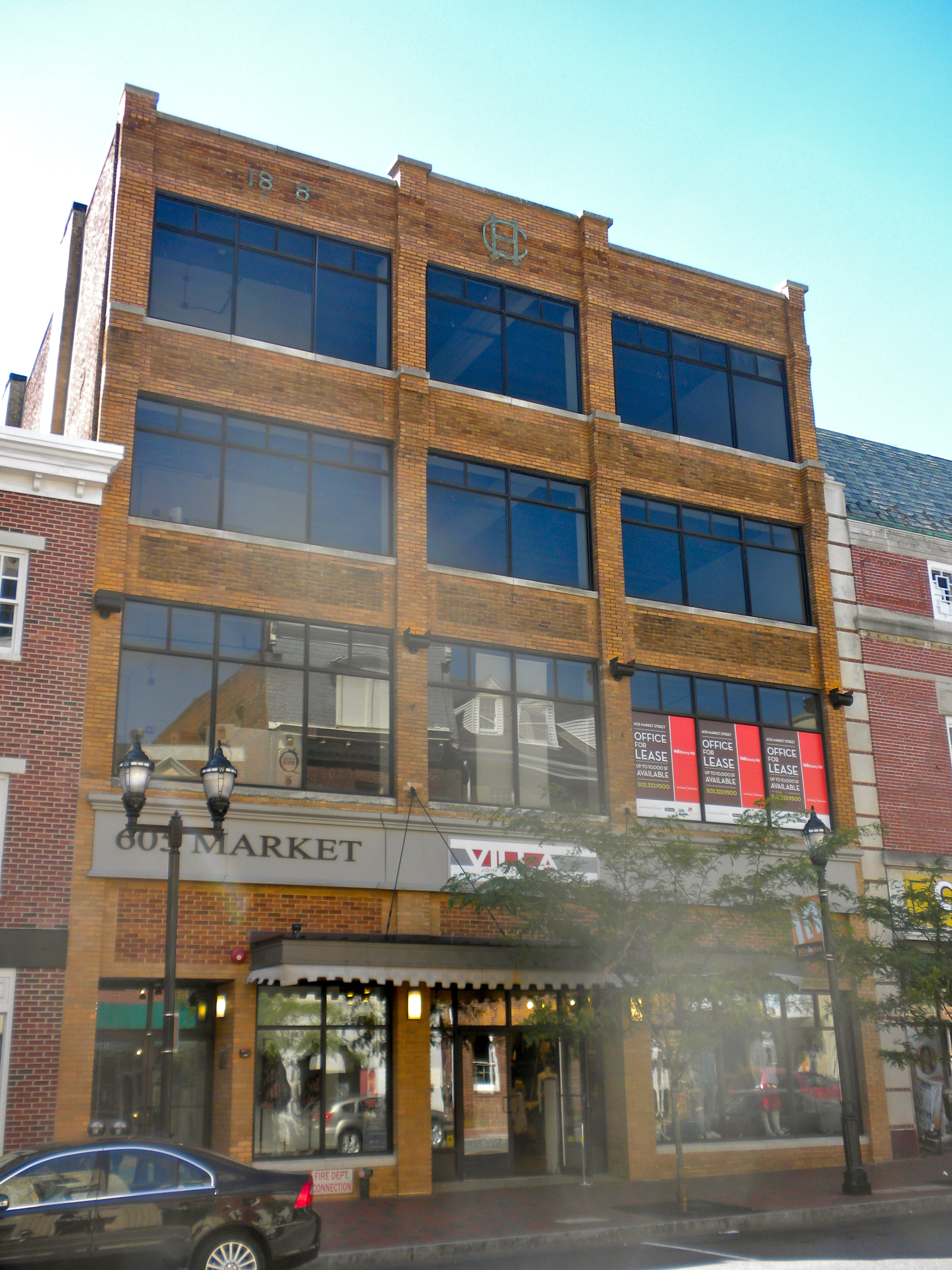
- Crosby and Hill Building, June 2010

- Location within Delaware Location within the United States
- Location: 605 N. Market St., Wilmington, Delaware 19801
- Coordinates: 39°44′32″N 75°33′1″W
- Area: 0.1 acres (0.040 ha)
- Built: 1859, 1920
- Architectural style: Early Commercial
- Part of: Downtown Wilmington Commercial Historic District (ID10000079)
- MPS: Market Street MRA (64000105)
- NRHP reference No.: 85000148

Significant dates
- Added to NRHP: January 30, 1985
- Designated CP: March 24, 2017

Crosby and Hill Building is a historic commercial building located at Wilmington, New Castle County, Delaware. It was built about 1859, with the present facade added in 1920.

== History ==
The building has housed a number of businesses including a pharmacy, the Household of Faith Church, the Crosby and Hill dry goods wholesaler and retailer, the Diamond Silk Shirt and Waist Company, the Wilmington Board of Trade Builders Exchange, and John's Bargain Basement Department Store Company.

It was added to the National Register of Historic Places in 1985.

== Architecture ==
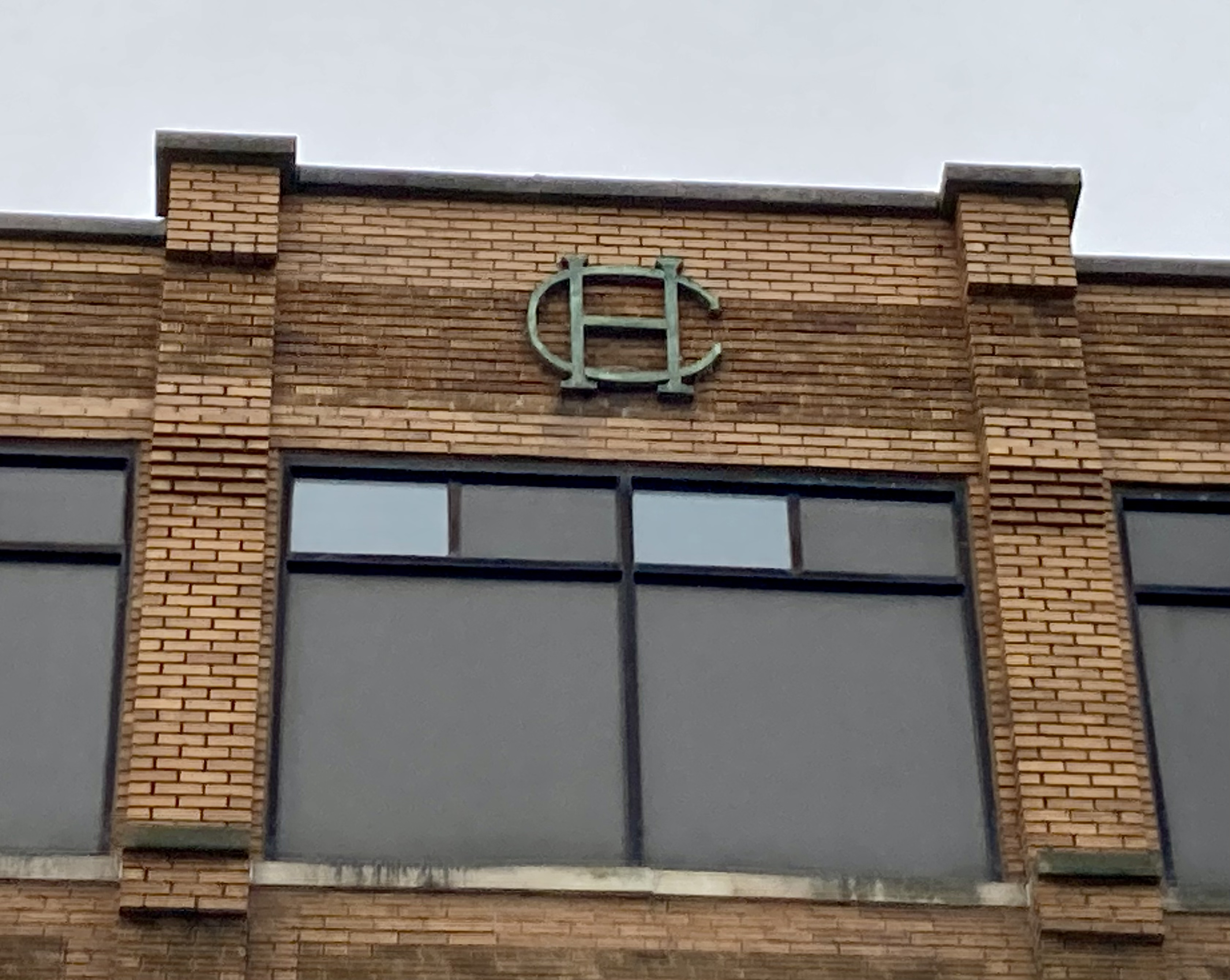
Detail from the top of the facade

It is a four-story, three-bay rectangular plan building of bearing wall brick construction. It has a flat roof with parapet wall. The building is an example of a late-19th century commercial building that was "modernized" in the first quarter of the 20th century.

== See also ==
- National Register of Historic Places listings in Wilmington, Delaware
