= One on One with Steve Adubato =

New Jersey television show

One on One with Steve Adubato is an American television series hosted by Steve Adubato. It is aired in New Jersey on NJTV, WNET (the network's sister station) and was formerly aired on FiOS1 New Jersey. It is produced by the Caucus Educational Corporation, which also produces Caucus: New Jersey and New Jersey Capital Report.
