= NJN News =

Daily broadcast television news program

NJN News is a half-hour daily broadcast television news program by the New Jersey Network which also aired in New York City on WNET Monday through Friday. It was sometimes preempted on holidays by special programming.

The program began in 1978 as New Jersey Nightly News, co-produced with WNET, although WNET also continued to air the newscast. In 1981, NJN assumed full control of the broadcast. NJN News had its final broadcast on June 30, 2011, when NJN went off the air to be replaced by NJTV (renamed to NJ PBS in 2021), which created a replacement newscast program called NJ Today (renamed to NJTV News in 2013, then to NJ Spotlight News in 2020).

Talent included former presenter Kent Manahan, news anchor Jim Hooker, environmental reporter Ed Rodgers, science reporter Patrick Regan, news anchor Sandra King, health reporter Sara Lee Kessler, and general reporters Marie DeNoia Aronson, Kent Saint John and others.
