= Steve Adubato Sr. =

American politician and educator (1932–2020)

Stephen N. Adubato Sr.
- Adubato c. 2010
- Born: December 24, 1932; Newark, New Jersey, U.S.
- Died: October 13, 2020 (aged 87)
- Education: Seton Hall University
- Occupations: Politician; educator
- Spouse: Frances Calvello (m. 1954)
- Children: 3, including Steve Jr.
- Relatives: Michael Adubato (brother); Richie Adubato (cousin)

Stephen N. Adubato Sr. (December 24, 1932 – October 13, 2020) was an American teacher, union organizer, and Democratic Party politician from Newark, New Jersey. As a leader in the city's North Ward and the legislative representative of the New Jersey Federation of Teachers, Adubato was a powerful éminence grise and power broker in local, county, and state politics, mentoring numerous Democratic Party figures but never holding an elected public office himself. His brother Michael and son Steve Jr. represented Newark and its suburbs in the New Jersey General Assembly from 1974 to 1992 and 1984 to 1986, respectively.

Historian Terry Golway has referred to Adubato as "the legendary boss of Newark’s North Ward."

== Early life and education ==
Stephen N. Adubato Sr. was born on December 24, 1932, in Newark, New Jersey. He was one of five siblings. His father died in 1950 at the age of 44.

In 1949, Adubato graduated from Barringer High School in Newark. He received his bachelor's degree in political science from Seton Hall University in 1954. Adubato attended Rutgers Law School but did not complete his degree.

While teaching, he obtained a master's degree in education from Seton Hall in 1960 and completed coursework for a Doctor of Education degree. Adubato was awarded an honorary doctorate from Kean University on May 11, 2010.

== Teaching career and labor organizing ==
He began his career in education as a history and government teacher in the Newark public school system, where he taught for 15 years.

Adubato served on the executive board of the Newark Teachers' Union and worked as their legislative representative and as a consultant to the New Jersey chancellor of higher education.

== Political and civic career ==
In 1962, Adubato ran for the Essex County Democratic Committee in Newark's North Ward, a heavily Italian American region of the city. He won a contested race. In 1968, he was elected as chair of the North Ward Democratic Municipal Committee.

Adubato first rose to statewide prominence in 1969, when he led a revolt against state AFL-CIO president and former Newark mayor Vincent J. Murphy. After Murphy blocked the union from endorsing Robert B. Meyner in the gubernatorial election that year, Adubato led a protest at the AFL-CIO convention which forced Murphy to leave the convention hall.

In 1970, Adubato founded the North Ward Educational and Cultural Center (later simply the North Ward Center) in a small second-floor office in a storefront on Bloomfield Avenue. In 1973, The North Ward Center purchased the Clark Mansion, which previously housed a financially troubled private school. In addition to national acclaim for its educational, cultural, and social services, the North Ward Center provided Adubato with the nucleus of a massive political machine. For many years thereafter, Adubato would deliver large pluralities of the vote to his preferred candidates in Newark.

Adubato made further advancements in 1970 when he endorsed Kenneth A. Gibson in the city's mayoral election. Gibson, who was challenging incumbent Hugh Addonizio, was seeking to become the African American mayor of any major city in the northeastern United States. Because Addonizio was a pillar of the Italian American community, Adubato's endorsement carried significant risk of political and social alienation. However, Gibson won the election, and Adubato's position as a political kingmaker, as well as someone able to straddle both sides of Newark's racial divide, was solidified.

Over the following decades, Adubato served as a mentor for numerous New Jersey political leaders, including Joe DiVincenzo, Kevin O'Toole, and Teresa Ruiz.

Over time, as the North Ward became less Italian American and increasingly Hispanic, the North Ward Center adapted to provide services to new demographics. In 1997, the North Ward Center founded the Robert Treat Academy Charter School, one of the first charter schools authorized by the New Jersey Department of Education.

== Personal life ==
He married Frances Calvello in 1954. They had three children, including Steve Jr. and Michelle, who succeeded him as CEO of the North Ward Center in August 2009.

Adubato died on October 13, 2020, after a long illness at the age of 87.
