= New Jersey Network =

Public broadcaster in New Jersey, United States (1971–2011)

Coordinates: 40°13′13″N 74°45′34″W

- Branding: NJN
- Country: United States
- Availability: statewide New Jersey
- Founded: 1968
- Launch date: Television: April 5, 1971; Radio: May 20, 1991
- Dissolved: June 30, 2011
- Callsign meaning: New Jersey Network
- Former affiliations: Television: PBS; Radio: NPR
- Official website: njn.net
- Replaced by: Television: NJTV; Radio: New Jersey Public Radio; simulcasts of WHYY-FM

The New Jersey Network (NJN) was a network of public television and radio stations serving the U.S. state of New Jersey. NJN was a member of the Public Broadcasting Service (PBS) for television and the National Public Radio (NPR) for radio, broadcasting their programming as well as producing and broadcasting their own programming, mostly relating to issues in New Jersey. With studios in both Trenton and Newark, NJN's television network covered all of New Jersey, plus parts of Pennsylvania, New York, Connecticut and Delaware. The radio network primarily served several areas of New Jersey that were not covered by Philadelphia and New York City public radio stations.

New Jersey Network ended operations on June 30, 2011. The television network was succeeded by NJTV (now branded as NJ PBS), and the radio stations were split through two separate sales to NPR-member stations in Philadelphia and New York.

== Early history ==
The system was founded in 1968 by an act of the New Jersey Legislature establishing the New Jersey Public Broadcasting Authority (NJPBA). New Jersey already had a public television station licensed within the state, WNET (channel 13), licensed to Newark. However, while WNET had offices and studios in Newark, for all practical purposes it was a New York City station, effectively leaving New Jersey without a public station of its own.

With state funding and four UHF licenses assigned years earlier by the Federal Communications Commission, the NJPBA went to work building the state's public television stations. The first station, WNJT (channel 52) in Trenton, went on the air on April 5, 1971, with the other three stations signing on over the next two years. The system was known on-air as New Jersey Public Television (NJPTV) until 1981, when it adopted the New Jersey Network identity.

Due to New Jersey being split between the New York City and Philadelphia television markets, NJN's television network reached one of the largest potential audiences in the country. At the time of its closure, it potentially reached over 25 million people in parts of five states. However, it also forced NJN to compete directly against three of the highest-rated PBS stations in the nation–WNET, secondary New York City member station WLIW, and Wilmington, Delaware-licensed WHYY-TV, in the Philadelphia market. Two other PBS member stations based in Pennsylvania, WLVT-TV in Allentown and WVIA-TV in Scranton, were also viewable in portions of NJN's coverage area.

NJN spent most of its existence trying to carve out a niche of its own. One of its solutions had been to air some of the more popular PBS shows on a delayed basis, after the nearby stations had carried the national PBS feed. Programs that might be seen on WNET and WHYY-TV would air on NJN a week or two later. Another solution was to focus on its news operation. The latter worked very well, as NJN and its reporters won many awards for their journalistic efforts. In the 1980s, NJN was the first media outlet to break the "Taggart affair" political patronage scandal. NJN's news and public affairs programming was initially co-produced by WNET until 1981, and continued simulcasting on WNET for several years afterward. That was part of a longstanding agreement between the FCC, New Jersey officials, and WNET that allowed WNET to fulfill its local programming obligations (since it was still licensed to Newark).

NJN's radio network began operation on May 20, 1991, when WNJT-FM in Trenton started operations. Eight other stations were established over the following seventeen years. They served mainly to bring NPR programming to the few areas of New Jersey without a clear signal from New York's WNYC AM-FM and Philadelphia's WHYY-FM.

In the immediate aftermath of the September 11 attacks of 2001, the station temporarily broadcast WABC-TV.

== Transition ==
In 2008, in the face of a proposed 35 percent cut in funding, NJN officials asked the state legislature for permission to become an independent nonprofit entity. Under this proposal, the state network would have likely been transferred to its nonprofit fundraising arm, the NJN Foundation. Two consultants looking into fundraising options speculated that breaking off from the state would have triggered an avalanche of private funding.

After assuming the office of New Jersey Governor in 2010, Chris Christie voiced his support for transforming NJN into a not-for-profit organization in his March 2010 budget speech. Christie believed the state taxpayers should not have to support a TV and radio network which many never watched or listened to, a stand in keeping with the growing Republican interest at the time in populism.

On October 15, 2010, a bipartisan legislative task force called for a "dramatic reconfiguration" of the state network, but not full privatization. Christie nonetheless moved forward with plans to remove state funding. On November 17, NJN handed termination notices to 130 employees, leading to speculation that the state network would shut down on January 1, 2011, when funding from the state would end. On December 17, 2010, Governor Christie signed legislation to transfer the state network to independent funding. The legislation also suspended the layoffs.

=== Endgame ===
On June 6, 2011, the split of NJN's radio and television operations was announced by Gov. Christie. They were as follows:

- Television: WNET assumed control of NJN's television stations for what was, initially, a five-year term under a new nonprofit entity called Public Media NJ. The television network was renamed NJTV, and promised to feature increased coverage of news and issues pertinent to New Jersey, as well as programming from the WNET and PBS libraries. Caucus Educational Corporation, which produces Caucus: New Jersey, serves as a producing partner with NJTV for New Jersey-focused public affairs programming. The agreement did not include transfer of the station licenses, which were retained by the New Jersey Public Broadcasting Authority; the contracts are instead tantamount to local management agreements in commercial broadcasting which nominally do not require approval from the FCC. Ironically, NJN was created in part due to concerns that WNET and WHYY-TV were not adequately serving the New Jersey portions of their service area.
- Radio: NJN's radio network was divided in a pair of multi-station sales, with New York Public Radio (owners of WNYC-AM-FM in New York City and Newark-licensed WQXR-FM) acquiring four stations and WHYY-FM in Philadelphia obtaining the other five. New York Public Radio used its stations to start a new New Jersey-oriented network, New Jersey Public Radio, while WHYY turned its new acquisitions into repeaters of WHYY-FM. These sales were approved by the FCC on August 29, 2011.

On June 23, 2011, the New Jersey State Assembly voted, 45 to 30, in favor of rejecting the WNET/Caucus proposal for transfer of control of the NJN television stations. The state Senate, however, passed the resolution on June 27 by a 20 to 19 margin, allowing the deal to go into effect as scheduled on July 1. All 130 NJN employees, who had been New Jersey state civil servants, either retired, were reassigned to other state agencies, or were terminated as a result of the system's closure.

The last scheduled program aired on NJN television was Theatre Talk, which was followed by a previously-aired news report and a pre-taped farewell message by Janice Selinger, NJN's acting executive director. NJN's website, www.njn.net, was archived and remained active for about a year after the shutdown; it redirected to the NJTV webpage, www.njtvonline.org for some time afterward. However, as of September 2014, it no longer redirected to that website, as the domain name was sold. Some of NJN's in-house public affairs programs, such as Due Process, On the Record and Reporters Roundtable, were picked up by, and continue to air on, its successor, NJTV.

== Television ==
The NJN television stations were:

- Camden: WNJS (channel 23/RF 22)
- Montclair: WNJN (channel 50/RF 51)^{1}
- New Brunswick: WNJB (channel 58/RF 8)
- Trenton: WNJT (channel 52/RF 43)

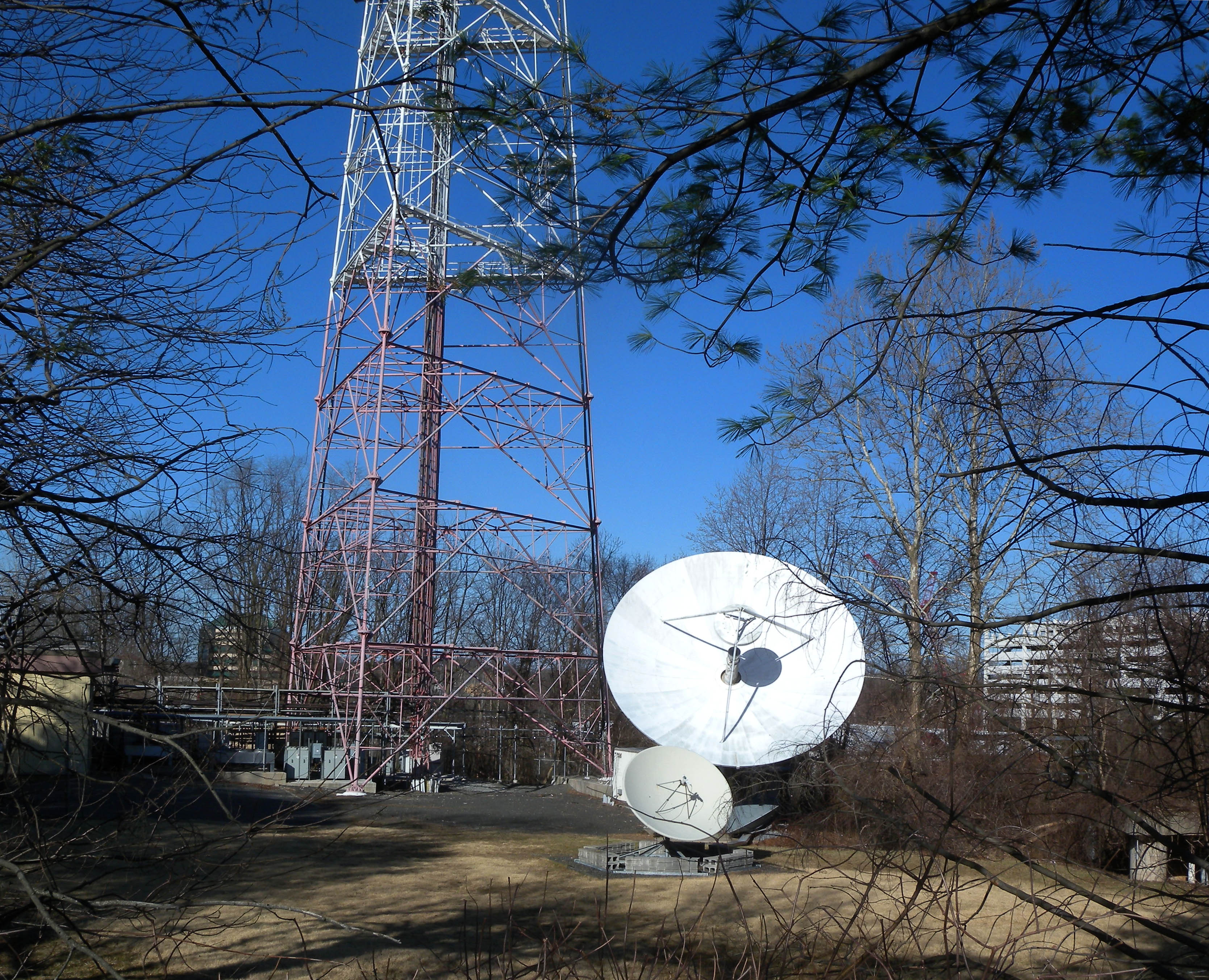
Montclair station

Notes

- ^{1} WNJN used the callsign WNJM (the M standing for Montclair) from 1973 sign-on to 1994.

Signal Reach

- WNJS: all of southern New Jersey (including, Camden, Haddon Township, Atlantic City), as well as Philadelphia and Wilmington, Delaware
- WNJN: all of northern New Jersey (including Newark, Jersey City and Paterson), as well as southern New York state (New York City and western Long Island) and a small portion of southwestern Connecticut
- WNJT: most of central New Jersey (including the city of Trenton, Monmouth, Mercer and Ocean counties)
- WNJB: most of north-central New Jersey (including, New Brunswick, Hunterdon, Somerset and Middlesex counties)

=== Digital television ===
The state network's digital signals were multiplexed:

Sub-channel	Programming
xx.1	main NJN/PBS programming
xx.2	NJN2
xx.3	AudioVision (audio only)

After NJN ceased operations and WNET took over the operations of NJN, NJN2 was removed and sub-channel .3 remained with no programming. In October 2017, the third sub-channel was removed and the .2 sub-channel began broadcasting NHK World.

=== Analog-to-digital conversion ===
The four NJN stations shut down their analog signals on June 12, 2009, as part of the DTV transition in the United States. Each of the four NJN stations remained on their pre-transition digital assignments using PSIP to display virtual channels for each NJN station corresponding to their former analog channel numbers.

=== Television Programming ===
Original materials from New Jersey Public Broadcasting Authority have been contributed to the American Archive of Public Broadcasting.

==== NJN-produced ====
- Another View
- Caucus: New Jersey
- Classroom Close-up, NJ
- Congress Watch
- Due Process
- Homeless Tails
- Images/Imagenes
- Inside Trenton
- New Jersey Works
- NJN Classics
- NJN News
- On the Record
- Reporters Roundtable
- Shepherd's Pie (monologue program hosted by Jean Shepherd)
- State of the Arts
- Tomorrow's Medicine Today (produced by Medical Missions for Children)
- The Uncle Floyd Show (aired in the 1980s)

==== Lottery Drawings ====
NJN aired live drawings from the New Jersey Lottery until the network's closure in 2011, at which point the Lottery began live-streaming its drawings (via Ustream, and later Livestream).

NJN's successor, NJTV, aired Lottery drawings from September 2011 through the end of 2012; on January 1, 2013, the drawings moved to two CBS-owned stations, WLNY-TV in the New York area and WPSG in Philadelphia. As of 2016, these drawings are now aired on WPIX in New York and WPHL-TV in Philadelphia.

== Radio ==
Unlike its television counterpart, NJN Radio covered mainly southern New Jersey, with only two transmitters in the northern part of the state. Due to the crowded state of the noncommercial end of the FM dial in the northeastern United States, the nine stations all operated at relatively low power. Much of the programming came from NPR and other public radio suppliers, with a simulcast of the audio of the television network's NJN News weekday evenings following All Things Considered.

- Stations acquired by WHYY, Inc., simulcasting WHYY-FM:

City	Call letters	Frequency
Atlantic City	WNJN-FM	89.7
Berlin	WNJS-FM	88.1
Bridgeton	WNJB-FM	89.3
Cape May Court House	WNJZ	90.3
Manahawkin	WNJM	89.9

- Stations acquired by New York Public Radio:

City	Call letters	Frequency
Netcong	WNJY	89.3
Sussex	WNJP	88.5
Trenton	WNJT-FM	88.1
Toms River	WNJO	90.3
