= New Jersey Public Radio =

- New Jersey; United States
- Broadcast area: Northern New Jersey
- Frequency: see table below

Programming
- Format: public radio (news/talk, jazz)
- Affiliations: American Public Media; NPR; Public Radio Exchange

Ownership
- Owner: New York Public Radio
- Sister stations: WNYC; WNYC-FM; WQXR-FM; WQXW

History
- First air date: July 1, 2011
- Call sign meaning: all stations: New Jersey

Technical information
- Class: A (all stations)

Links
- Website: www.wnyc.org/new-jersey-public-radio

New Jersey Public Radio (NJPR) is an NPR member network serving portions of northern New Jersey on four licensed stations: 88.1 WNJT-FM in Trenton, 88.5 WNJP in Sussex, 89.3 WNJY in Netcong, and 90.3 WNJO in Toms River, which were the four northernmost radio stations of the New Jersey Network (NJN) until 2011. NJPR is owned by New York Public Radio (NYPR), which also owns the two WNYC and two WQXR-FM stations. NJPR primarily serves northern New Jersey residents who are unable to get a clear signal from the WNYC stations. The network went on the air on July 1, 2011, after NJN ended operations the day before.

== Overview ==
The seeds which led to the formation of New Jersey Public Radio were planted in 2008, when NJN officials asked the New Jersey Legislature for permission to explore the possibility of spinning-off into a non-profit entity, independent from state funding. However, on June 6, 2011, New Jersey governor Chris Christie, who vowed to end state-funded public broadcasting upon taking office in 2010, announced the sale of the radio network. The northern part of the network was sold to New York Public Radio, which used the stations to start a new New Jersey-focused public radio network. A formal agreement was signed on June 29. NYPR assumed control of the stations under a management agreement on July 1; the Federal Communications Commission approved the sale on August 29, 2011.

== Programming ==
Originally, New Jersey Public Radio's programming was largely identical to the programming that had been offered by NJN; consisting primarily of national programming from NPR, Public Radio Exchange, and American Public Media, as well as a simulcast of WBGO's jazz programming in the overnight hours.

On January 12, 2012; NJPR rolled out a new schedule. Among the highlights were a local host for Morning Edition and increased New Jersey-centric news and information content in partnership with the New Jersey News Service, headquartered at Montclair State University.

== Stations ==
Due to the crowded state of the noncommercial end of the FM dial in the northeastern United States, the four New Jersey Public Radio stations all operate at relatively low power for full NPR members on the FM band. None has an ERP greater than 4,000 watts.

Call sign	Frequency	City of license	Facility ID	ERP (W)	HAAT	Class	Transmitter coordinates	First air date
WNJY	89.3 FM	Netcong	93964	1 horizontal; 520 vertical	131 m (430 ft)	A	40°53′14.4″N 74°41′53.6″W	July 8, 2008
WNJP	88.5 FM	Sussex	48471	450	194 m (636 ft)	A	41°8′37.3″N 74°32′16.6″W	August 1998
WNJO	90.3 FM	Toms River	123020	1 horizontal; 4,000 vertical	37 m (121 ft)	A	39°54′52.4″N 74°4′56.4″W	August 23, 2008
WNJT-FM	88.1 FM	Trenton	48488	110	210 m (689 ft)	A	40°16′58.4″N 74°41′9.6″W	May 20, 1991

All four NJPR stations were knocked off the air on October 29, 2012, after Hurricane Sandy. While WNJY, WNJP and WNJT returned to the air by November 3, once power and studio to transmitter link connections could be restored, it took until December 14 to get WNJO back on the air as its transmitter is located near Seaside Park on the Barnegat Peninsula, which was inaccessible from mainland New Jersey for some time after the storm. This transmitter site experienced long term utility outages for both power and audio connectivity. New York Public Radio engineering director Jim Stagnitto initially feared that the WNJO transmitter was swept into Barnegat Bay, but found it intact when his team was able to access the site.
