= NJ PBS =

PBS member network in New Jersey

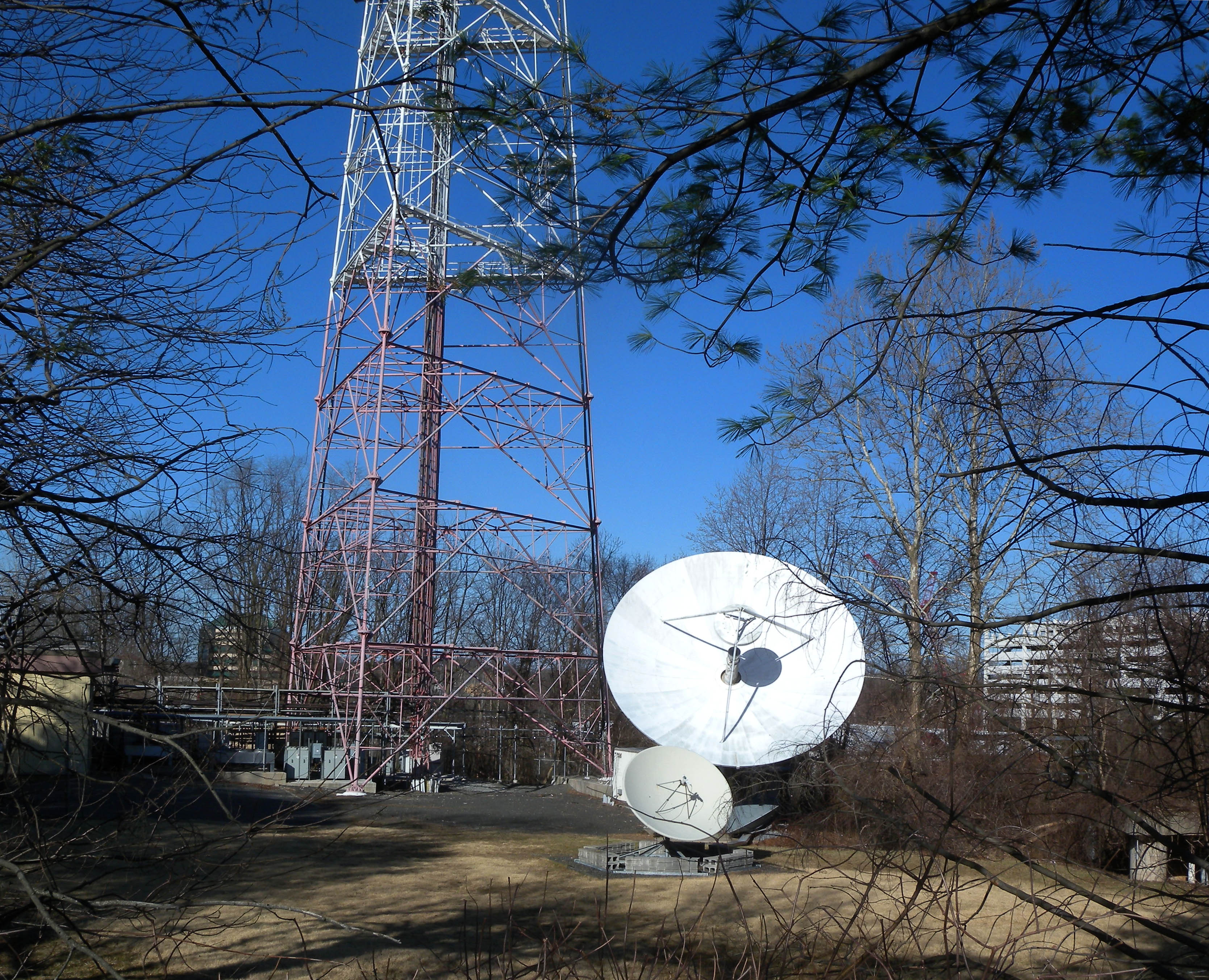
- WNJN transmitter facility at Montclair State University
- Branding: NJ PBS (general); NJ PBS News (newscasts)
- Country: United States
- First air date: July 1, 2011
- Broadcast area: Statewide New Jersey
- Owner: New Jersey Public Broadcasting Authority
- Former names: NJTV (2011–2021)
- Digital channel: see § Stations
- Operator: Montclair State University
- Callsign meaning: All stations: New Jersey; 4th letter: see § Stations
- Affiliations: .1: PBS; .2: First Nations Experience
- Official website: www.njpbs.org (Station); www.njspotlightnews.org (News)
- Replaced: NJN

NJ PBS (branded as NJTV prior to 2021) is a public television network serving the U.S. state of New Jersey. The network is owned by the New Jersey Public Broadcasting Authority (NJPBA), an agency of the New Jersey state government which owns the licenses for all but one of the PBS member stations licensed in the state. NJPBA outsources the network's operations to Montclair State University in Montclair. In addition to PBS programming, NJ PBS airs shows distributed by American Public Television (APT); the network also produces and broadcasts its own programs, mostly related to issues in New Jersey. NJ PBS' operations, offices, and studios are based at the College of Communication and Media in Morehead Hall at Montclair.

NJ PBS is the successor to New Jersey Network (NJN), the state-controlled public television and radio service. NJN ceased operations on June 30, 2011, and Public Media NJ took control of the former NJN television stations the following day.

In September 2025, WNET, then-operator of NJ PBS, announced that it would not renew its contract to operate NJ PBS after July 2026, and the network was reported to be at risk of shutting down if there was no replacement to operate it when WNET's contract expired. NJ PBS closed its Newark broadcast studio in May 2026, with its last news broadcasts being done remotely through September 2026. On June 3, 2026, New Jersey state treasurer Aaron Binder announced that Montclair State University would take over NJ PBS's operations on July 1.

== History ==
In 2008, officials with the New Jersey Network asked the New Jersey Legislature for permission to explore making NJN an independent nonprofit organization. Under this scenario, the NJN licenses would have been transferred to the network's fundraising arm, the NJN Foundation. However, on June 6, 2011, New Jersey's Governor during that time, Chris Christie, who vowed to end state-funded public broadcasting when he assumed office in 2010, announced an agreement to turn control of the NJN television network to WNET. As part of the deal, WNET.org created Public Media NJ as a separate New Jersey–based nonprofit to operate the stations. NJN was created in 1971, partly due to concerns that WNET and Philadelphia's main PBS outlet, WHYY-TV (channel 12), were not adequately serving their New Jersey viewers.

Under the terms of the deal, the NJPBA would retain the licenses, but outsource the stations' operations to Public Media NJ for five years with two additional five-year renewal options. Public Media NJ would receive funding from the Corporation for Public Broadcasting (CPB) and all revenues related to the former NJN technical operations. The measure was defeated by the state assembly on June 23, 2011. The state senate, however, passed the resolution on June 27, allowing Public Media NJ to take over NJN's television operations as scheduled on July 1, 2011. The network was relaunched as NJTV; all members of NJN automatically became members of NJTV. The first program to be aired on NJTV was Charlie Rose (which was produced by its sister station WNET).

On July 26, 2011, NJTV announced a partnership with the Foundation for New Jersey Public Broadcasting (formerly the NJN Foundation) to jointly fund and create additional public affairs programming. NJTV and the NJN Foundation merged in September 2012.

On February 24, 2021, NJTV rebranded as "NJ PBS", adapting to the 2019 PBS rebrand recommended to its local stations.

== Programming ==
The Caucus Educational Corporation (CEC), a non-profit producer of New Jersey-focused public affairs programs, is under contract with Public Media NJ and WNET to provide original programming for NJ PBS. CEC produces Caucus: New Jersey, State of Affairs, and One on One with Steve Adubato, which are hosted by Steve Adubato. CEC also produced the New Jersey Capitol Report, which ended after a seven-year run in March 2017. NJ PBS also broadcasts programming distributed by PBS, American Public Television, and additional local productions.

=== Locally produced programming ===
- American Songbook at NJPAC
- Classroom Closeup NJ
- Driving Jersey
- Due Process
- On the Record
- Que Pasa NJ
- Reporters Roundtable
- State of the Arts
- This is South Jersey

=== News programming ===
Shortly after the network's relaunch as NJTV, the network launched NJ Today, a half-hour newscast that replaced NJN News and was aired at its former weekday time slots of 6, 7:30 and 11 pm. It was originally anchored by WNET personality Rafael Pi Roman. Mike Schneider then replaced Pi Roman as anchor. It was renamed to NJTV News on November 4, 2013. On June 12, 2014, Schneider announced his retirement as anchor on NJTV News and was replaced by veteran journalist Mary Alice Williams on July 1. On May 2015, NJTV opened a television studio at Two Gateway Center in Newark. Williams later left the newscast after March 13, 2020, to help care for family members who were suffering from health problems. She eventually announced the following month on April 27, 2020, that she would resign as anchor of NJTV News. She was succeeded by Briana Vannozzi, who has anchored the newscast since March 15, 2020. She was an interim anchor until September 9, 2020, when she became a full-time anchor. Schneider still appears on other WNET and NJTV-produced programs, including WNET's Metrofocus. NJTV News is produced at the Agnes Varis studio in Two Gateway Center in Newark. The newscast can also be seen on sister station WNET and online via YouTube and on NJTV's website. Because of WNET (as well as its sister station WLIW) and WHYY carrying PBS News Hour, NJ PBS does not carry that program, to avoid unnecessary duplication.

Michael Aron, NJN's news director at its closure and a former member of the foundation's board, revived his former NJN programs Reporters Roundtable and On the Record on NJTV. He also appears on NJTV News as its chief political correspondent.

==== NJ Spotlight News ====
On October 5, 2020, NJTV's newsroom merged with the New Jersey news site NJ Spotlight (which was acquired by WNET in 2019) and the newscasts were rebranded as NJ Spotlight News. In May 2022, NJ Spotlight News released its first podcast series, Hazard NJ, hosted by journalist Jordan Gass-Pooré.

On August 7, 2026, Montclair State University, the operator of NJ PBS, announced that the university will acquire NJ Spotlight from The WNET Group and will have its assets integrated into NJ PBS and would also keep its founding editor, John Mooney, who would lead the transition into NJ PBS News.

==== NJ PBS News ====
On October 1, 2026, Montclair State University took over the news operations of NJ PBS under the name NJ PBS News. Rob Nelson currently takes the role as the news anchor since then, replacing Briana Vannozzi from the then WNET-operated NJ Spotlight News.

=== Lottery drawings ===
Formerly broadcast on NJN, New Jersey Lottery drawings began airing on NJTV on September 8, 2011, on a tape delay. Before this happened, the New Jersey Lottery had no other outlet to showcase any of their live drawings after NJN's closure except via online live streaming services such Ustream and Livestream.com. NJTV continued hosting the tape-delayed drawings until January 1, 2013, when the drawings were moved to two CBS owned stations, WLNY-TV and WPSG. From 2014 to 2020, lottery drawings were aired live on WPIX and WPHL-TV. As of 2020, no drawings for the state lottery are televised; instead the Lottery's afternoon, evening and Cash4Life drawings are carried on the Lottery's website and social media platforms. Powerball and Mega Millions drawings were never aired on the network as WTXF-TV and WABC-TV air these drawings (with the latter occasionally airing Powerball drawings at certain occasions).

== Stations ==
NJ PBS' four full-power stations reach a potential audience of almost 28 million people in parts of six states, reaching all of New Jersey, along with parts of New York, Connecticut, Pennsylvania, Delaware, and even Maryland. While this gives NJ PBS one of the largest potential audiences in the country, it also must compete directly against three of the most-watched PBS member stations in the country, sister stations WNET and WLIW, as well as WHYY-TV. Additionally, WLVT-TV (channel 39) in Allentown, Pennsylvania, overlaps some of NJ PBS' broadcast area.

In the FCC incentive auction concluded in 2017, WNJN and WNJT's spectrum was sold to the FCC for $138,059,363 and $193,892,273, respectively. NJ PBS announced that these stations would share spectrum with the two remaining stations, WNJS and WNJB respectively. On January 23, 2018, per FCC filings, WNJN began channel-sharing with WNJB and WNJT began channel-sharing with WNJS.

NJ PBS stations
Station	City of license	Channel; VC (RF)	Facility ID	ERP	HAAT	Transmitter coordinates	First air date	Public license information
WNJB (Note: WNJB used the callsign WTLV during its construction permit until April 30, 1971.)	New Brunswick	58 (8)	48457	40.82 kW	218 m (715 ft)	40°37′17″N 74°30′14″W	June 2, 1973	Public file; LMS
WNJN (Note: WNJN used the callsign WNJM from its 1973 sign-on to 1994, and was WNJN-TV from May 1 to June 1, 1994.)	Montclair	50 (8)	48477	40.82 kW	218 m (715 ft)	40°37′17″N 74°30′14″W	June 2, 1973	Public file; LMS
WNJS	Camden	23 (23)	48481	281 kW	264 m (866 ft)	39°43′41″N 74°50′38″W	October 23, 1972	Public file; LMS
WNJT (Note: Flagship station)	Trenton	52 (23)	48465	281 kW	264 m (866 ft)	39°43′41″N 74°50′38″W	April 5, 1971	Public file; LMS

=== Translators ===
NJ PBS translators (WNJB)
Call sign	City of license	Channel	Facility ID	ERP	HAAT	Transmitter coordinates
W23EX-D	Sussex	23	48466	3.87 kW	182.2 m (597.8 ft)	41°08′37″N 74°32′17.0″W
W27EC-D	Belvidere	27	48484	1.5 kW	240.6 m (789.4 ft)	40°46′14.3″N 75°03′50.60″W
W29EV-D	Hackettstown	29	48482	1.5 kW	157.4 m (516.4 ft)	40°51′08.1″N 74°52′22.5″W

=== Cable and satellite availability ===
NJ PBS is available on all New Jersey cable providers, along with most cable, satellite and IPTV providers in the New York (using WNJN/WNJB) and Philadelphia (using WNJS/WNJT) television markets, into New York State, Delaware, and Pennsylvania (with some limited availability in Fairfield County, Connecticut, and Cecil County, Maryland).

== Subchannels ==
NJ PBS multiplex
Subchannel	Res.	Short name	Programming
xx.1	1080i	(Call sign)	PBS
xx.2	1080i	(Call sign).2	First Nations Experience
