= National Register of Historic Places listings in Wilmington, Delaware =

This is a list of properties listed on the National Register of Historic Places in Wilmington, Delaware:

For reasons of size, the listings in New Castle County are divided into four lists: those in Wilmington, those in Newark, other listings in northern New Castle County (north of the Chesapeake and Delaware Canal), and those in southern New Castle County (south of the Chesapeake and Delaware Canal).

There are 403 properties and districts listed on the National Register in the county. Of these, 91 are in Wilmington. Five of these sites are further designated as National Historic Landmarks. The locations of National Register properties and districts for which the latitude and longitude coordinates are included below, may be seen in an online map.

This National Park Service list is complete through NPS recent listings posted August 28, 2026.

Contents: Counties and municipalities in Delaware
Newark (New Castle) | Wilmington (New Castle) | Northern New Castle | Southern New Castle | Kent | Sussex

== Current listings ==
	Name on the Register	Image	Date listed	Location	Description
1	American Vulcanized Fibre Company-Wilmington Plant	American Vulcanized Fibre Company-Wilmington Plant	October 19, 2020 (#100005688)	700 Maryland Ave. 39°44′15″N 75°33′59″W	
2	Augustine Paper Mill	Augustine Paper Mill	August 3, 1978 (#78000909)	N. Brandywine Park Dr. 39°45′43″N 75°33′25″W	
3	Bancroft and Sons Cotton Mills	Bancroft and Sons Cotton Mills	December 20, 1984 (#84000439)	Rockford Rd. 39°46′06″N 75°33′47″W	
4	The Bank of Delaware Building		April 27, 2026 (#100012943)	300 Delaware Avenue; 39°44′48″N 75°33′01″W	
5	Baynard Boulevard Historic District	Baynard Boulevard Historic District	July 26, 1979 (#79000631)	Baynard Blvd. between 18th St. and Concord Ave. 39°45′29″N 75°32′39″W	
6	Bellevue Range Rear Light Station	Bellevue Range Rear Light Station	April 26, 2006 (#06000313)	Christina River northern side, 0.3 mile west of Delaware River, 50 feet south of Cherry Island; 39°43′13″N 75°31′04″W	
7	Brandywine Park	Brandywine Park	December 22, 1976 (#76000574)	Roughly bounded by Augustine, 18th, and Market Sts. and Lovering Ave. 39°45′27″N 75°33′13″W	
8	Brandywine Village Historic District	Brandywine Village Historic District	February 24, 1971 (#71000229)	Roughly bounded by Brandywine Creek, Tatnall, 22nd, Gordon Sts., Vandever Ave., Mabel St., and the 14th St. bridge 39°45′04″N 75°32′29″W	
9	Braunstein's Building	Braunstein's Building	December 19, 1985 (#85003190)	704-706 N. Market St. 39°44′34″N 75°32′57″W	
10	Dr. John A. Brown House	Dr. John A. Brown House	April 24, 1979 (#79000632)	4 7th Ave. 39°44′06″N 75°34′18″W	
11	Florence and Isaac Budovitch House	Florence and Isaac Budovitch House	January 30, 2020 (#100004954)	4611 Bedford Blvd. 39°47′00″N 75°31′37″W	
12	Church Street Historic District	Church Street Historic District	June 12, 1987 (#87000944)	Bounded by Eighth, Locust, Seventh, and Church Sts. 39°44′21″N 75°32′26″W	
13	Compton Park Apartments	Compton Park Apartments	November 1, 2024 (#100010936)	610-650 N. Walnut Street; 39°44′28″N 75°32′49″W	
14	Continental Army Encampment Site	Continental Army Encampment Site	December 18, 1973 (#73000547)	Lovering Ave. near Broom St. 39°45′28″N 75°33′22″W	
15	Cool Spring Park Historic District	Cool Spring Park Historic District	December 27, 1983 (#83003513)	Bounded by Park Pl., Jackson, Van Buren, and 10th Sts. 39°45′00″N 75°33′34″W	
16	Crosby and Hill Building	Crosby and Hill Building	January 30, 1985 (#85000148)	605 N. Market St. 39°44′32″N 75°33′01″W	
17	Delaware Academy of Medicine	Delaware Academy of Medicine	April 17, 2003 (#03000240)	1925 Lovering Ave. 39°45′44″N 75°33′42″W	
18	Delaware Avenue Historic District	Delaware Avenue Historic District	September 13, 1976 (#76000576)	Delaware Ave. from N. Harrison to N. Broom Sts. (both sides); 39°45′18″N 75°33′34″W	
19	Delaware Trust Building	Delaware Trust Building	April 18, 2003 (#03000238)	900–912 N. Market St. 39°44′41″N 75°32′52″W	Residences@Rodney Square
20	Delmarva Power and Light Building	Delmarva Power and Light Building	January 30, 1985 (#85000149)	600 N. Market St. 39°44′31″N 75°33′00″W	Housed Delaware College of Art & Design, 1997-2024
21	Jacob Dingee House	Jacob Dingee House	October 16, 1970 (#70000171)	500 Block North Market Street (formerly 105 E. 7th St.); 39°44′30″N 75°33′03″W	
22	Obidiah Dingee House	Obidiah Dingee House	October 21, 1970 (#70000172)	500 Block North Market Street (formerly 107 E. 7th St.); 39°44′30″N 75°33′03″W	
23	Downtown Wilmington Commercial Historic District	Downtown Wilmington Commercial Historic District	March 24, 2017 (#100000790)	Roughly bounded by W. 9th, N. King. W. 6th & Shipley Sts. 39°44′34″N 75°32′59″W	
24	P. S. Dupont High School	P. S. Dupont High School	October 23, 1986 (#86002917)	701 W. 34th St., 39°45′51″N 75°32′00″W	Now used as a middle school.
25	East Brandywine Historic District	East Brandywine Historic District	December 19, 1985 (#85003220)	Roughly bounded by Sixteenth St., Brandywine Creek, Twelfth St., and U.S. Route 13; 39°44′55″N 75°32′31″W	
26	Eighth Street Park Historic District	Eighth Street Park Historic District	August 4, 1983 (#83001334)	Roughly bounded by 6th, 10th, Harrison, and Broom Sts. 39°44′56″N 75°33′47″W	
27	Zachariah Ferris House	Zachariah Ferris House	October 19, 1970 (#70000173)	500 Block North Market Street (formerly 414 W. 2nd St.); 39°44′30″N 75°33′03″W	
28	Foord & Massey Furniture Company Building	Foord & Massey Furniture Company Building	March 24, 2006 (#06000145)	701 N. Shipley St. 39°44′35″N 75°33′01″W	
29	Fort Christina	Fort Christina	October 15, 1966 (#66000260)	E. 7th St. and the Christina River, Fort Christina State Park; 39°44′14″N 75°32′18″W	
30	Friends Meetinghouse	Friends Meetinghouse	November 7, 1976 (#76000577)	4th and West Sts. 39°44′31″N 75°33′17″W	
31	Gibraltar	Gibraltar	September 14, 1998 (#98001098)	250 Pennsylvania Ave. 39°45′41″N 75°34′30″W	DeArmond, Ashmead & Bickley, architects of 1915 alteration.
32	Govatos'/McVey Building	Govatos'/McVey Building	January 30, 1985 (#85000150)	800 N. Market St. 39°44′36″N 75°32′56″W	
33	Grace United Methodist Church	Grace United Methodist Church	November 12, 1983 (#83001393)	9th and West Sts. 39°44′47″N 75°33′06″W	
34	Charles Gray Printing Shop	Charles Gray Printing Shop	January 30, 1985 (#85000151)	11 E. 8th St. 39°44′36″N 75°32′55″W	Demolished.
35	Harlan and Hollingsworth Office Building	Harlan and Hollingsworth Office Building	April 26, 1979 (#79000634)	West St. 39°44′18″N 75°33′21″W	
36	Holy Trinity Church	Holy Trinity Church	October 15, 1966 (#66000261)	7th and Church Sts. 39°44′18″N 75°32′26″W	
37	Howard High School	Howard High School	February 21, 1985 (#85000309)	13th and Poplar Sts. 39°44′48″N 75°32′30″W	
38	Jackson-Wilson House	Jackson-Wilson House	April 10, 2017 (#100000844)	12 Red Oak Rd. 39°45′58″N 75°34′19″W	
39	Max Keil Building	Max Keil Building	January 30, 1985 (#85000152)	712 N. Market St. 39°44′35″N 75°32′57″W	
40	Max Keil Building	Max Keil Building	January 30, 1985 (#85000153)	700 N. Market St. 39°44′34″N 75°32′58″W	
41	Kingswood Methodist Episcopal Church	Kingswood Methodist Episcopal Church	February 9, 1989 (#89000008)	Fourteenth and Claymont Sts. 39°44′36″N 75°31′58″W	Replaced by new construction.
42	Logan House	Logan House	April 2, 1980 (#80000935)	1701 Delaware Ave. 39°45′30″N 75°33′45″W	
43	Charles B. Lore Elementary School	Charles B. Lore Elementary School	June 16, 1983 (#83001337)	Fourth St. and Woodlawn Ave. 39°45′01″N 75°34′36″W	
44	Lower Market Street Historic District	Lower Market Street Historic District	May 15, 1980 (#80000936)	Market St. 39°44′21″N 75°33′07″W	
45	Main Office of the New Castle Leather Company	Main Office of the New Castle Leather Company	December 19, 1985 (#85003191)	Eleventh and Poplar Sts. 39°44′41″N 75°32′36″W	
46	Masonic Hall and Grand Theater	Masonic Hall and Grand Theater	December 11, 1972 (#72000294)	818 N. Market St. 39°44′38″N 75°32′55″W	
47	Louis McLane House	Louis McLane House	April 24, 1973 (#73000549)	606 Market St. 39°44′32″N 75°32′59″W	Demolished in 2014.
48	Mount Joy United Methodist Church	Mount Joy United Methodist Church	August 24, 2026 (#100013330)	451 Townsend Street; 39°43′47″N 75°32′41″W	
49	New Castle Leather Raw Stock Warehouse	New Castle Leather Raw Stock Warehouse	June 16, 1983 (#83001401)	14th and Poplar Sts. 39°44′49″N 75°32′28″W	
50	New Century Club	New Century Club	June 16, 1983 (#83001336)	1014 Delaware Ave. 39°45′06″N 75°33′22″W	Delaware Children's Theatre
51	Old Asbury Methodist Church	Old Asbury Methodist Church	November 7, 1976 (#76000578)	Walnut and 3rd Sts. 39°44′18″N 75°32′56″W	
52	Old Customshouse	Old Customshouse	November 21, 1974 (#74000604)	516 N. King St. 39°44′29″N 75°32′57″W	Wilmington University building
53	Old First Presbyterian Church of Wilmington	Old First Presbyterian Church of Wilmington	April 13, 1972 (#72000295)	West St. on Brandywine Park Dr. 39°45′03″N 75°32′51″W	
54	Old Town Hall	Old Town Hall	December 31, 1974 (#74000605)	512 Market St. 39°44′30″N 75°33′00″W	
55	Old Town Hall Commercial Historic District	Old Town Hall Commercial Historic District	January 30, 1985 (#85000154)	Roughly bounded by 5th, N. King, 6th, and Shipley Sts. 39°44′30″N 75°33′02″W	
56	Philips-Thompson Buildings	Philips-Thompson Buildings	April 16, 1980 (#80000937)	200-206 E. 4th St. 39°44′22″N 75°32′59″W	Replaced by new construction.
57	Postles House	Postles House	November 12, 1982 (#82001028)	1007 N. Broom St. 39°45′09″N 75°33′43″W	
58	Public School No. 19	Public School No. 19	December 20, 1984 (#84000453)	801 S. Harrison St. 39°44′15″N 75°34′07″W	Susan McLaughlin Treatment Ctr.
59	Howard Pyle Studios	Howard Pyle Studios	March 8, 1978 (#78000911)	1305 and 1307 N. Franklin St. 39°45′17″N 75°33′28″W	
60	Quaker Hill Historic District	Quaker Hill Historic District	September 6, 1979 (#79000635)	Roughly bounded by Tatnall, Jefferson, 2nd and 7th Sts. 39°44′31″N 75°33′18″W	
61	Reynold's Candy Company Building	Reynold's Candy Company Building	January 30, 1985 (#85000155)	703 N. Market St. 39°44′34″N 75°33′00″W	Cavanaugh's Restaurant
62	Riverview Cemetery Company of Wilmington, Delaware	Riverview Cemetery Company of Wilmington, Delaware	July 3, 2012 (#12000378)	3300 & 3117 N. Market St. 39°45′31″N 75°31′51″W	
63	Rockford Park	Rockford Park	September 20, 1978 (#78000912)	Roughly bounded by Red Oak and Rockford Rds., Church and Rising Sun Lanes, and the Brandywine River; 39°46′00″N 75°34′18″W	
64	Rodney Court	Rodney Court	April 2, 1980 (#80000938)	1100 Pennsylvania Ave. 39°45′09″N 75°33′25″W	
65	Rodney Square Historic District	Rodney Square Historic District	August 10, 2011 (#11000522)	Buildings fronting Rodney Square at 10th, 11th, Market & King Sts. 39°44′45″N 75°32′49″W	
66	St. Anthony's Roman Catholic Church	St. Anthony's Roman Catholic Church	May 3, 1984 (#84000851)	W. 9th and N. DuPont Sts. 39°45′09″N 75°34′00″W	
67	St. Hedwig's Roman Catholic Church	St. Hedwig's Roman Catholic Church	November 12, 1982 (#82001024)	Linden and S. Harrison Sts. 39°44′25″N 75°33′57″W	
68	St. Joseph's Catholic Church	St. Joseph's Catholic Church	January 14, 2004 (#03001385)	1012 N. French St. 39°44′43″N 75°32′43″W	
69	St. Mary of the Immaculate Conception Church	St. Mary of the Immaculate Conception Church	December 12, 1976 (#76000580)	6th and Pine Sts. 39°44′21″N 75°32′38″W	
70	St. Mary's School	St. Mary's School	January 5, 1983 (#83001339)	502 Pine St. 39°44′20″N 75°32′39″W	Elementary Workshop Montessori School
71	St. Nicholas Ukrainian Catholic Church	St. Nicholas Ukrainian Catholic Church	January 25, 2021 (#100006071)	610 South Heald St. 39°43′40″N 75°32′42″W	
72	Charles Schagrin Building	Charles Schagrin Building	January 30, 1985 (#85000156)	608 N. Market St. 39°44′32″N 75°32′59″W	Demolished in 2014.
73	Frank E. Schoonover Studios	Frank E. Schoonover Studios	April 20, 1979 (#79000636)	1616 Rodney St. 39°45′26″N 75°33′30″W	Four studios used by Frank Schoonover and other students of Howard Pyle
74	Scott A.M.E. Zion Church		March 28, 2024 (#100010113)	629 E. 7th Street; 39°44′23″N 75°32′33″W	
75	Shipley Run Historic District	Shipley Run Historic District	August 9, 1984 (#84000854)	Roughly bounded by Adams, 11th, Jefferson, and 7th Sts. 39°44′49″N 75°33′21″W	
76	Starr House	Starr House	March 24, 1971 (#71000232)	1310 King St. 39°44′53″N 75°32′41″W	
77	STATE OF PENNSYLVANIA (steamboat)	STATE OF PENNSYLVANIA (steamboat)	April 20, 1979 (#79000637)	Christina River; 39°43′53″N 75°33′39″W	Scrapped in 2005.
78	Torbert Street Livery Stables	Torbert Street Livery Stables	September 14, 1998 (#98001095)	305-307 Torbert St. 39°44′57″N 75°32′59″W	
79	Henry Townsend Building	Henry Townsend Building	January 30, 1985 (#85000157)	709 N. Market St. 39°44′35″N 75°32′59″W	
80	Trinity Episcopal Church	Trinity Episcopal Church	August 16, 1984 (#84000855)	1108 N. Adams St. 39°45′01″N 75°33′17″W	
81	U.S. Post Office, Courthouse, and Customhouse	U.S. Post Office, Courthouse, and Customhouse	June 14, 1979 (#79000638)	11th and Market Sts. 39°44′48″N 75°32′48″W	Wilmington Trust Building
82	Water Witch Steam Fire Engine Company No. 5	Water Witch Steam Fire Engine Company No. 5	September 23, 2011 (#11000697)	1814 Gilpin Ave. 39°45′36″N 75°33′47″W	
83	Wawaset Park Historic District	Wawaset Park Historic District	January 3, 1986 (#86000008)	Bounded by Pennsylvania Ave., Woodlawn Ave., Seventh St., and Greenhill Ave. 39°45′22″N 75°34′31″W	
84	West 9th Street Commercial Historic District	West 9th Street Commercial Historic District	December 22, 2008 (#08001204)	111-320 W. 9th St., 901-909 N. Orange St., 825-901 N. Tatnall St. 39°44′44″N 75°33′02″W	
85	Wilmington Amtrak Station	Wilmington Amtrak Station	November 21, 1976 (#76000581)	Front and French Sts. 39°44′12″N 75°33′04″W	Frank Furness, architect (1908).
86	Wilmington Club	Wilmington Club	April 19, 2006 (#06000282)	1103 N. Market St. 39°44′49″N 75°32′51″W	
87	Wilmington Rail Viaduct	Wilmington Rail Viaduct	November 10, 1999 (#99001276)	Amtrak's northeast corridor through Wilmington; 39°44′17″N 75°33′43″W	
88	Wilmington Savings Fund Society	Wilmington Savings Fund Society	January 30, 1985 (#85000158)	838 N. Market St. 39°44′40″N 75°32′53″W	
89	Wilmington YMCA	Wilmington YMCA	February 20, 2002 (#02000035)	501 W. 11th St. 39°44′55″N 75°33′05″W	
90	Woodward Houses	Woodward Houses	April 20, 1979 (#79000639)	701-703 West St. 39°44′39″N 75°33′10″W	
91	F. W. Woolworth Company Building	F. W. Woolworth Company Building	January 2, 1987 (#86003755)	839 N. Market St. 39°44′41″N 75°32′55″W	Downtown Happy Harry's

== Former listing ==
	Name on the Register	Image	Date listed	Date removed	Location	Description
1	Capt. Thomas Mendenhall House	Capt. Thomas Mendenhall House	September 17, 1970 (#70000174)	February 16, 1983	205 E. Front St. 39°44′14″N 75°33′01″W	Torn down in December 1981.

== See also ==
- National Register of Historic Places listings in Delaware
- List of National Historic Landmarks in Delaware
- Wilmington Landmarks
