= Max Keil Building =

Max Keil Building may refer to the following buildings in Wilmington, Delaware:

- Max Keil Building (700 N. Market Street)
- Max Keil Building (712 N. Market Street)
