= F. W. Woolworth Building (Wilmington, Delaware) =

- F. W. Woolworth Company Building
- U.S. National Register of Historic Places
- U.S. Historic district – Contributing property
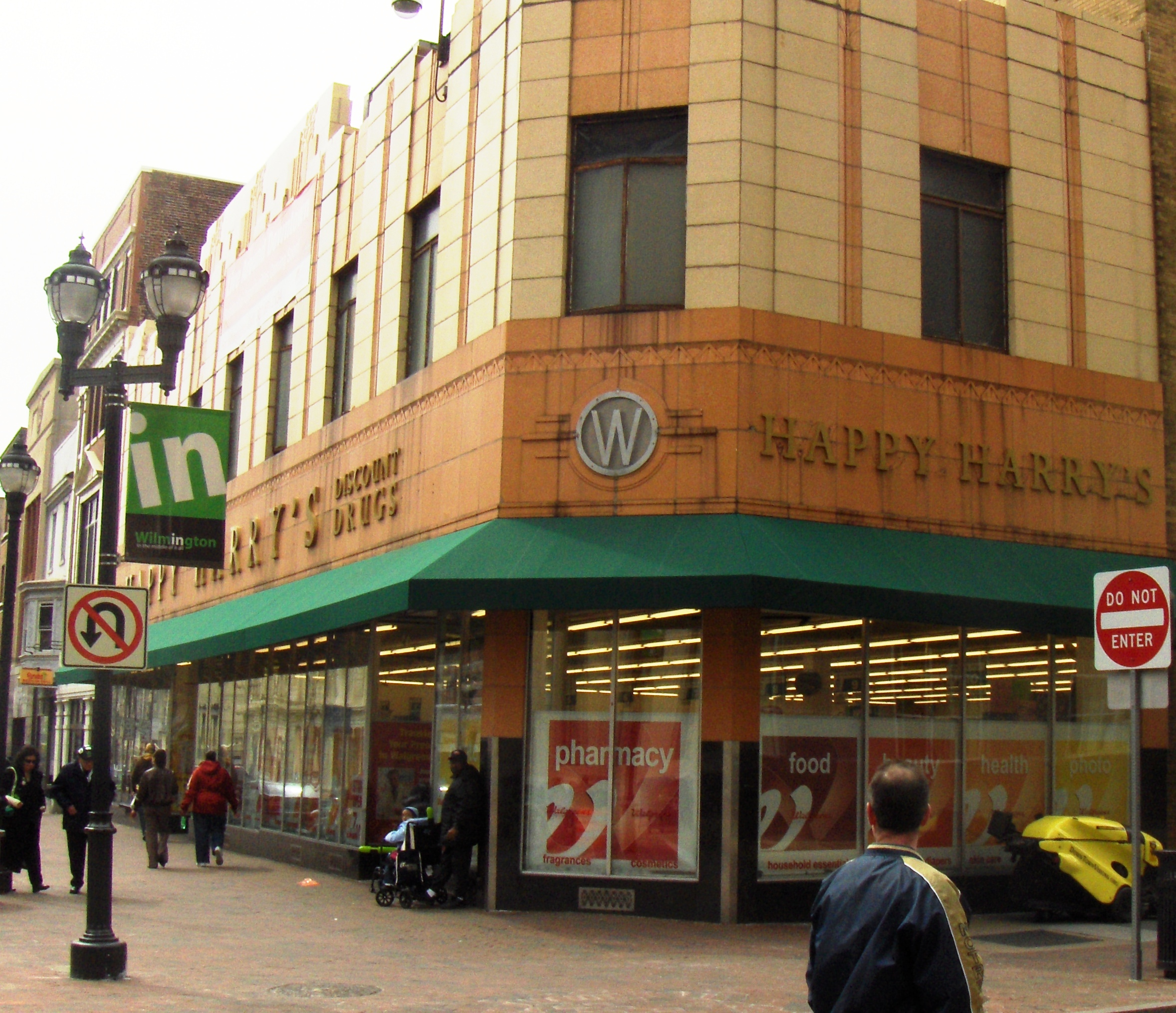
- Facing the corner with Market Street to the left and 9th to the right.

- Location within Delaware Location within the United States
- Location: 839 N. Market St., Wilmington, Delaware
- Coordinates: 39.744644°N 75.548589°W
- Area: 0.3 acres (0.12 ha)
- Built: 1940
- Architect: Stakes, H.W.
- Architectural style: Art Deco
- Part of: Downtown Wilmington Commercial Historic District (ID10000079)
- MPS: Market Street MRA (65000105)
- NRHP reference No.: 86003755

Significant dates
- Added to NRHP: January 2, 1987
- Designated CP: March 24, 2017

The F. W. Woolworth Company Building is a historic department store building located in downtown Wilmington, Delaware.

== History ==
From 1940 to 1997, the F. W. Woolworth Company operated the store, this location being one of the last to close. The building then housed a Happy Harry's drug store and pharmacy for several years until that company was purchased by Walgreens in 2007. Walgreens continued to operate the acquired Happy Harry's stores, including the Market Street store, under the Happy Harry's name for some time. The building was purchased by a subsidiary of BPG Property Group in 2008 who now leases the location back to Walgreens and it's opened under the Walgreens name.

== Architecture ==
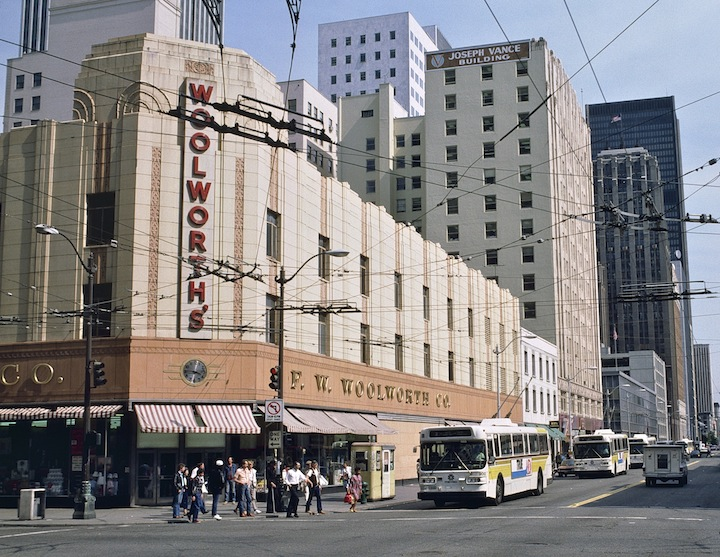
The Woolworth's in downtown Seattle used similar architectural elements.

Designed by company architect H. W. Stakes, the art deco building uses steel frame construction with a masonry curtain wall. The facade on the 2nd and 3rd stories displays alternating peach and cream vertical stripes of terra cotta tile with lotus motifs. The building has a grey medallion with a raised "W" on the chamfered corner on 9th and Market.

When a Woolworth's store, the interior had two sales floors, the current ground floor and the bargain basement. The escalators to the basement floor are still visible in the store.

In 1959, Woolworth added a third story which appeared in the original blue prints. BPG has plans to renovate the building's upper floors and to add an additional two stories to the building for use as apartments.

== Location ==
The building stands at the shopping intersection of 9th and Market streets a block off Rodney Square at the heart of the central business district. Woolworths also operated another store four blocks away at 504 Market Street. That second location now houses the Delaware History Museum.

== See also ==
- List of Woolworth buildings
- Delaware Historical Society
- National Register of Historic Places listings in Wilmington, Delaware
