= Reynold's Candy Company Building =

- U.S. National Register of Historic Places
- U.S. Historic district – Contributing property
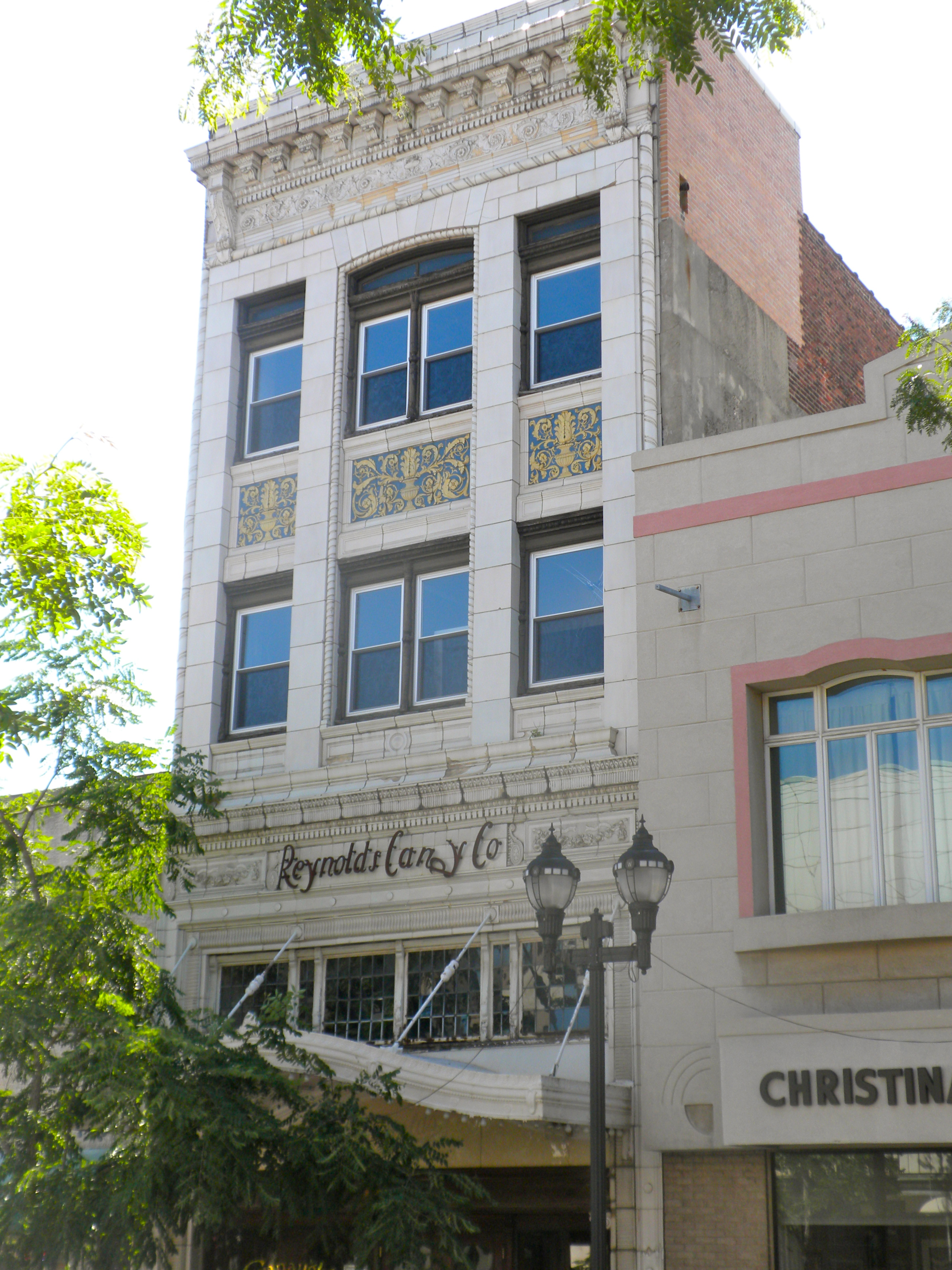
- Reynold's Candy Company Building, June 2010

- Location within Delaware Location within the United States
- Location: 703 N. Market St., Wilmington, Delaware
- Coordinates: 39.742898°N 75.549908°W
- Area: 0.1 acres (0.040 ha)
- Built: 1929; 97 years ago
- Architectural style: Beaux Arts, Italian Renaissance
- Part of: Downtown Wilmington Commercial Historic District (ID10000079)
- MPS: Market Street MRA (64000105)
- NRHP reference No.: 85000155

Significant dates
- Added to NRHP: January 30, 1985
- Designated CP: March 24, 2017

Reynold's Candy Company Building is a historic commercial building located at Wilmington, New Castle County, Delaware, United States. It was built in 1929 as a restaurant and candy factory. It is a three-story, three bay commercial building with a rectangular plan built of wall bearing brick construction. It features a curved cast metal canopy over the front doors, an ornate white terra cotta facade, terra cotta panels with stylized vine pattern relief, and is in the Beaux Arts style.

It was added to the National Register of Historic Places in 1985.

== See also ==
- Govatos'/McVey Building
- National Register of Historic Places listings in Wilmington, Delaware
