= Harlan and Hollingsworth Office Building =

- U.S. National Register of Historic Places
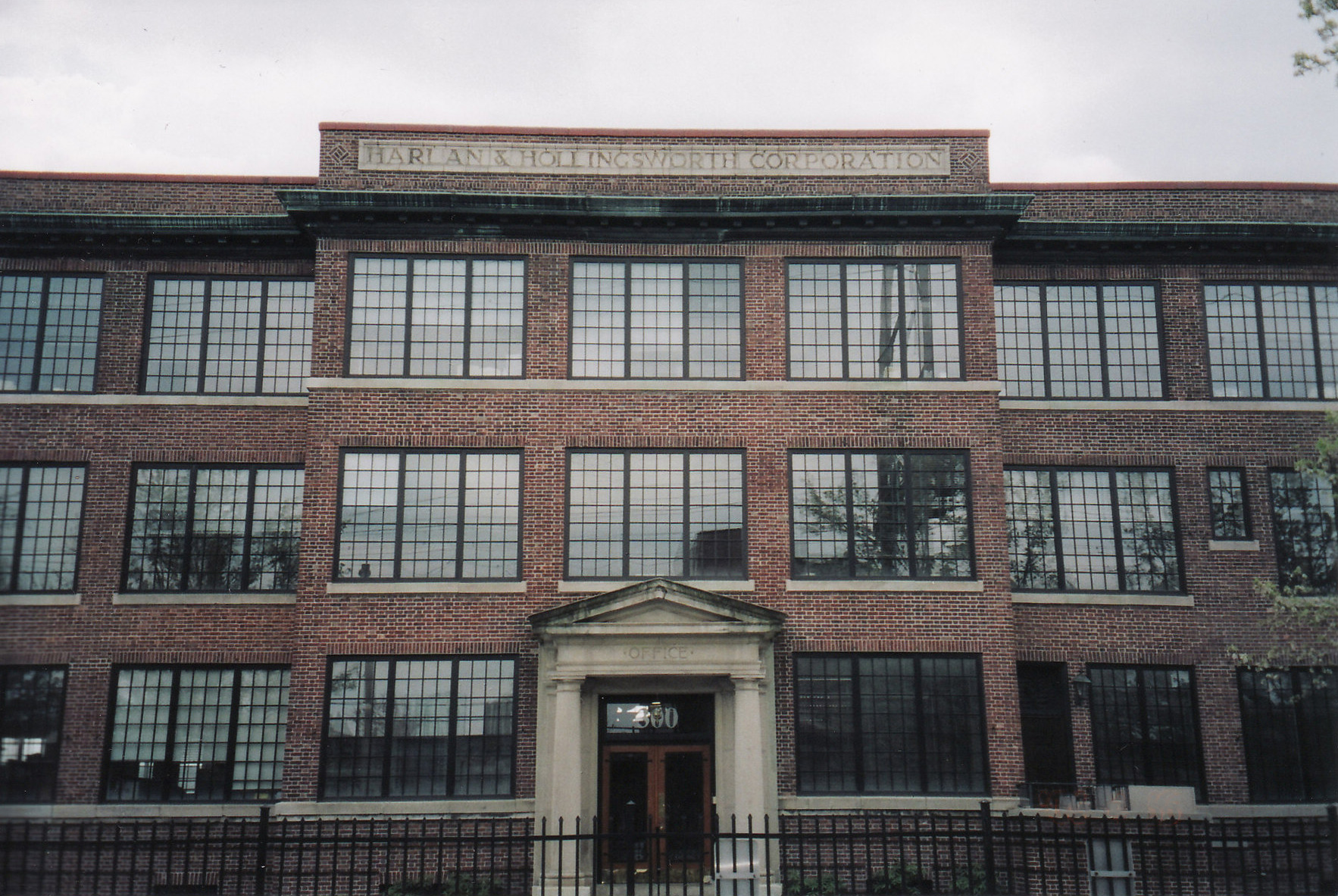
- Front of the Harlan and Hollingsworth Office Building.

- Location within Delaware Location within the United States
- Location: West St., Wilmington, Delaware
- Coordinates: 39.738469°N 75.555964°W
- Area: 0.5 acres (0.20 ha)
- Built: 1912
- Architectural style: Colonial Revival
- NRHP reference No.: 79000634
- Added to NRHP: April 26, 1979

The Harlan and Hollingsworth Office Building is a historic office building located in Wilmington, New Castle County, Delaware. It was completed in 1912, and stands on the corner of West St. and the Wilmington Rail Viaduct. It is a three-story, detached, rectangular brick-faced building with two small rear wings in the Colonial Revival style. It features two large, decorated copper-faced bay windows projecting from each face of the right corner of the second story.

By 1910, existing office facilities at the Harlan Plant of Bethlehem Steel (formerly Harlan and Hollingsworth) had become inadequate, and work started on a new office building. It survived the closing of the Harlan Plant in 1944, and once housed laboratories for Gates Engineering Company. The building was purchased by 100 South West Street Associates in 1991 and restored.

It was listed in the National Register of Historic Places in 1979.

== See also ==
- Jackson and Sharp Company
- National Register of Historic Places listings in Wilmington, Delaware
