= Water Witch Steam Fire Engine Company No. 5 =

- U.S. National Register of Historic Places
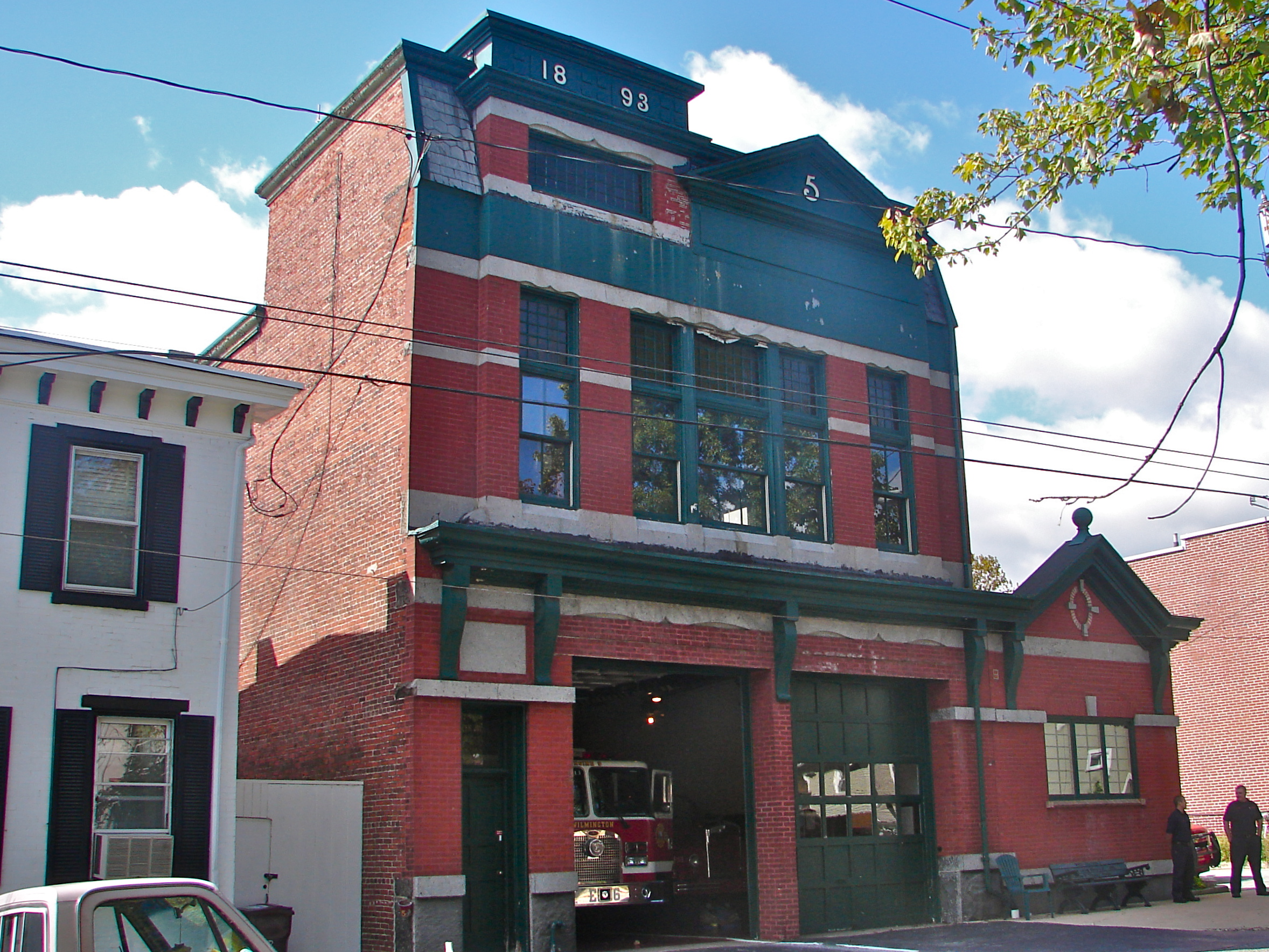

- Location within Delaware Location within the United States
- Location: 1814 Gilpin Ave., Wilmington, Delaware
- Coordinates: 39.759926°N 75.563189°W
- Built: 1893
- Architect: Edward L. Rice, Jr.
- NRHP reference No.: 11000697
- Added to NRHP: September 23, 2011

The Water Witch Steam Fire Engine Company No. 5 is a historic fire station at 1814 Gilpin Avenue in Wilmington, Delaware. The 2 1/2-story brick building was designed by Edward L. Rice, Jr., a leading Wilmington architect, and built in 1893. The building is an architecturally eclectic mix of Queen Anne and Second Empire styling, and has retained many of its original interior details.

The building was listed on the National Register of Historic Places in 2011.

== See also ==
- National Register of Historic Places listings in Wilmington, Delaware
