= Govatos'/McVey Building =

- U.S. National Register of Historic Places
- U.S. Historic district – Contributing property
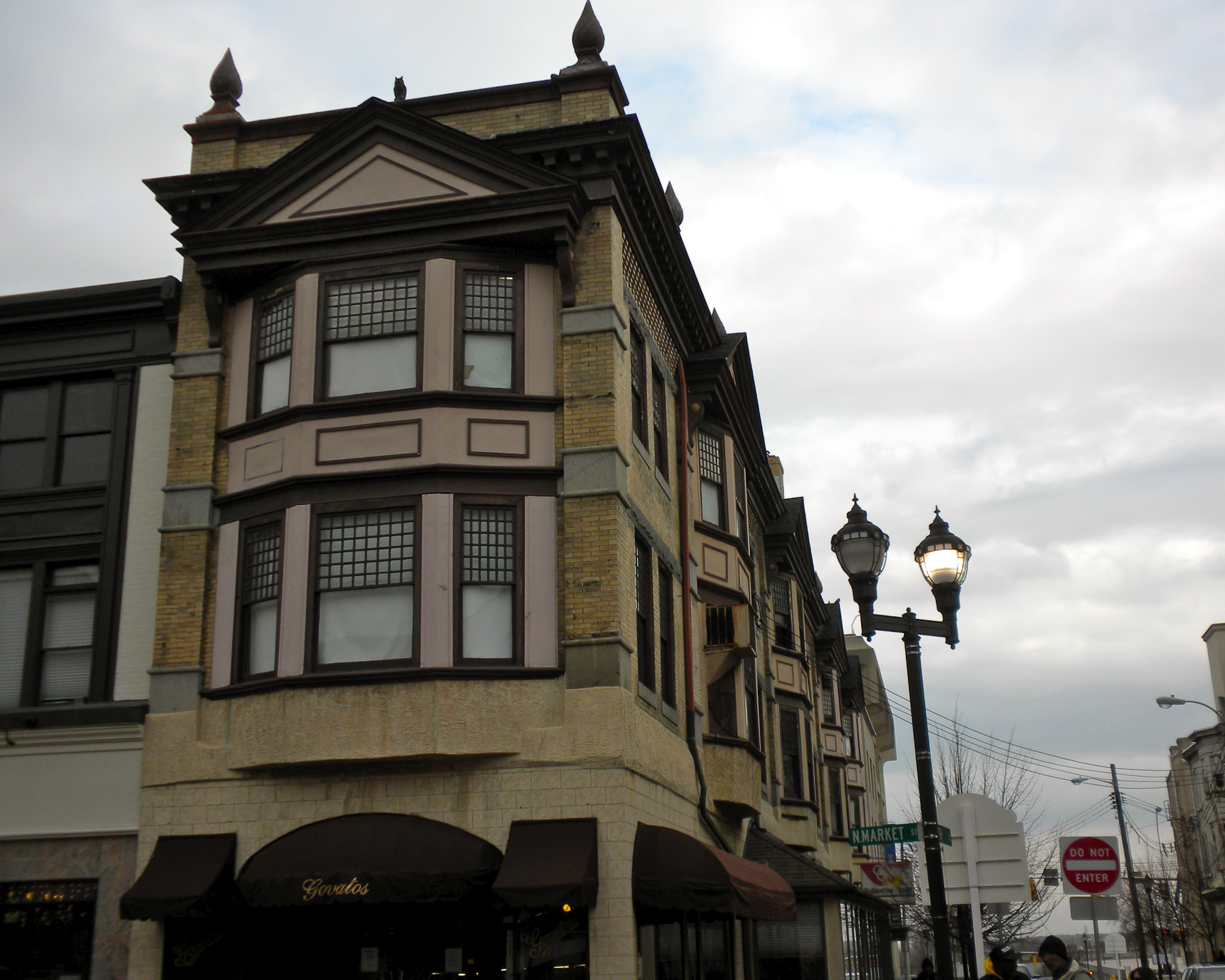
- Govatos'/McVey Building, January 2010

- Location within Delaware Location within the United States
- Location: 800 N. Market St., Wilmington, Delaware
- Coordinates: 39.743368°N 75.548848°W
- Area: 0.1 acres (0.040 ha)
- Built: 1895
- Architectural style: Late Victorian, Queen Anne
- Part of: Downtown Wilmington Commercial Historic District (ID10000079)
- MPS: Market Street MRA
- NRHP reference No.: 85000150

Significant dates
- Added to NRHP: January 30, 1985
- Designated CP: March 24, 2017

Govatos'/McVey Building is a historic commercial building located at Wilmington, New Castle County, Delaware. It was built in 1895, and is a three-story, rectangular plan building of bearing wall brick construction. During the first half of the 20th century, it was converted into a restaurant, candy factory/shop by removing original storefronts along East Eighth Street. The building features large half-hexagonal pedimented copper bays on the second and third stories in the Queen Anne style. The building has housed Govatos Chocolates since 1910–1918. Govatos is the last candy making firm in Wilmington and still makes hand-dipped candy by the same method as in 1894.

It was added to the National Register of Historic Places in 1985.

== See also ==
- Reynold's Candy Company Building
- National Register of Historic Places listings in Wilmington, Delaware
