= Downtown Wilmington Commercial Historic District =

Historic district in Delaware, United States

- U.S. National Register of Historic Places
- U.S. Historic district
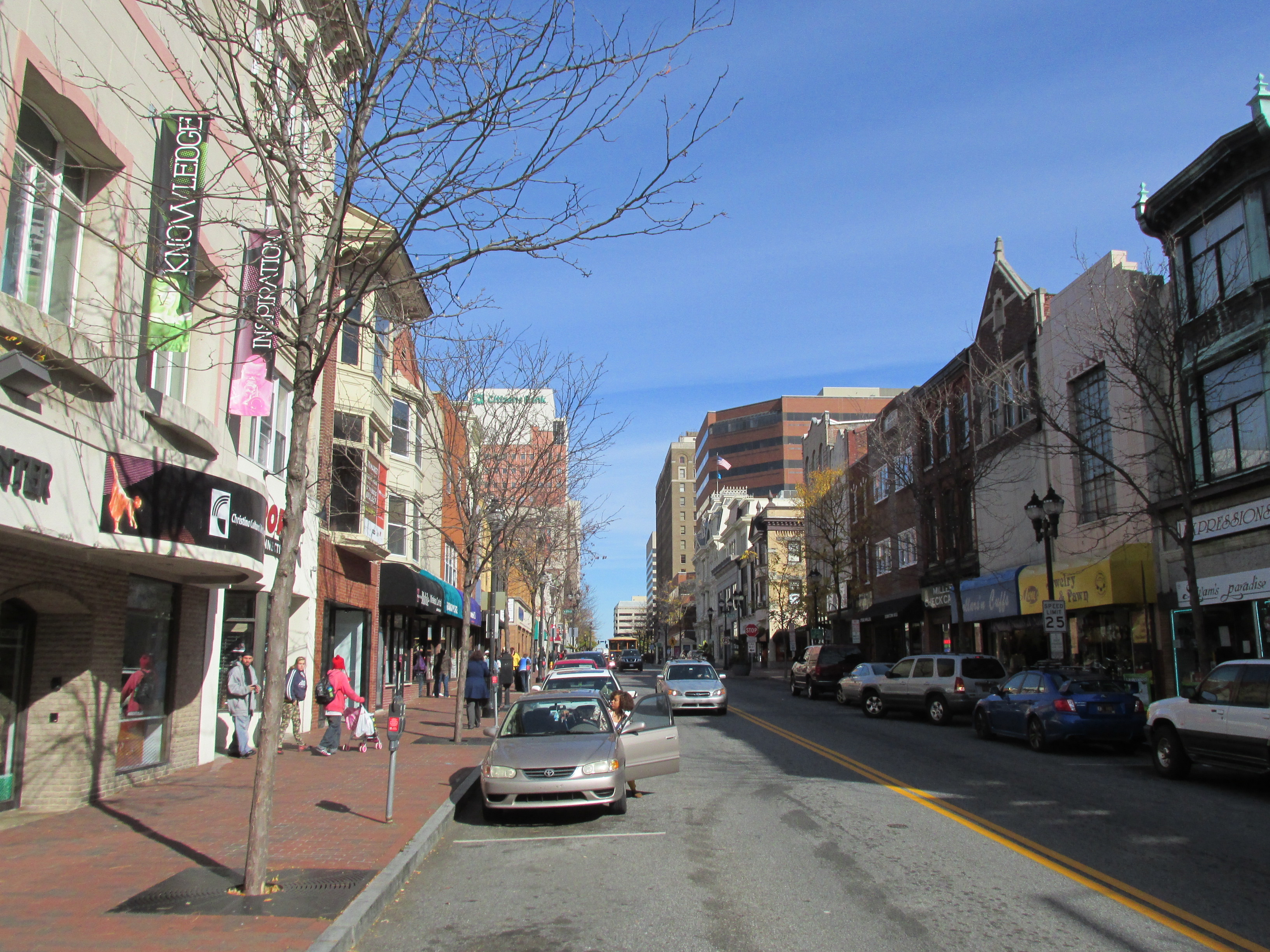

- Location within Delaware Location within the United States
- Location: Roughly North Market St. between 6th and 9th Avenues, Wilmington, Delaware
- Coordinates: 39°44′34″N 75°32′59″W
- Area: 12 acres (4.9 ha)
- Built: 1870-1968
- Architect: Multiple
- NRHP reference No.: 100000790
- Added to NRHP: March 24, 2017

Downtown Wilmington Commercial Historic District is a national historic district in Wilmington, New Castle County, Delaware. It encompasses 44 buildings in the city's downtown, most on North Market Street between 6th and 9th avenues. The district was the commercial center of the city between roughly 1870 and 1968, and contains an architecturally distinguished collection of late 19th- and early 20th-century architecture. The Grand Opera House, built in 1871, is the oldest surviving building in the district.

The district was added to the National Register of Historic Places in 2017.

== Contributing properties ==
The district includes 45 contributing properties including 12 that are also individually listed on the National Register:

- North Market Street
  - 600: Delmarva Power & Light Building
  - 605: Crosby and Hill Building
  - 700: Max Keil Building (1875)
  - 703: Reynold's Candy Company Building
  - 704-706: Braunstein's Building
  - 709: Henry Townsend Building
  - 712: Max Keil Building (1850)
  - 800: Govatos'/McVey Building
  - 818: Grand Opera House
  - 838: Wilmington Savings Fund Society
  - 839: F. W. Woolworth Building
- North Shipley Street
  - 701: Foord & Massey Furniture Company Building

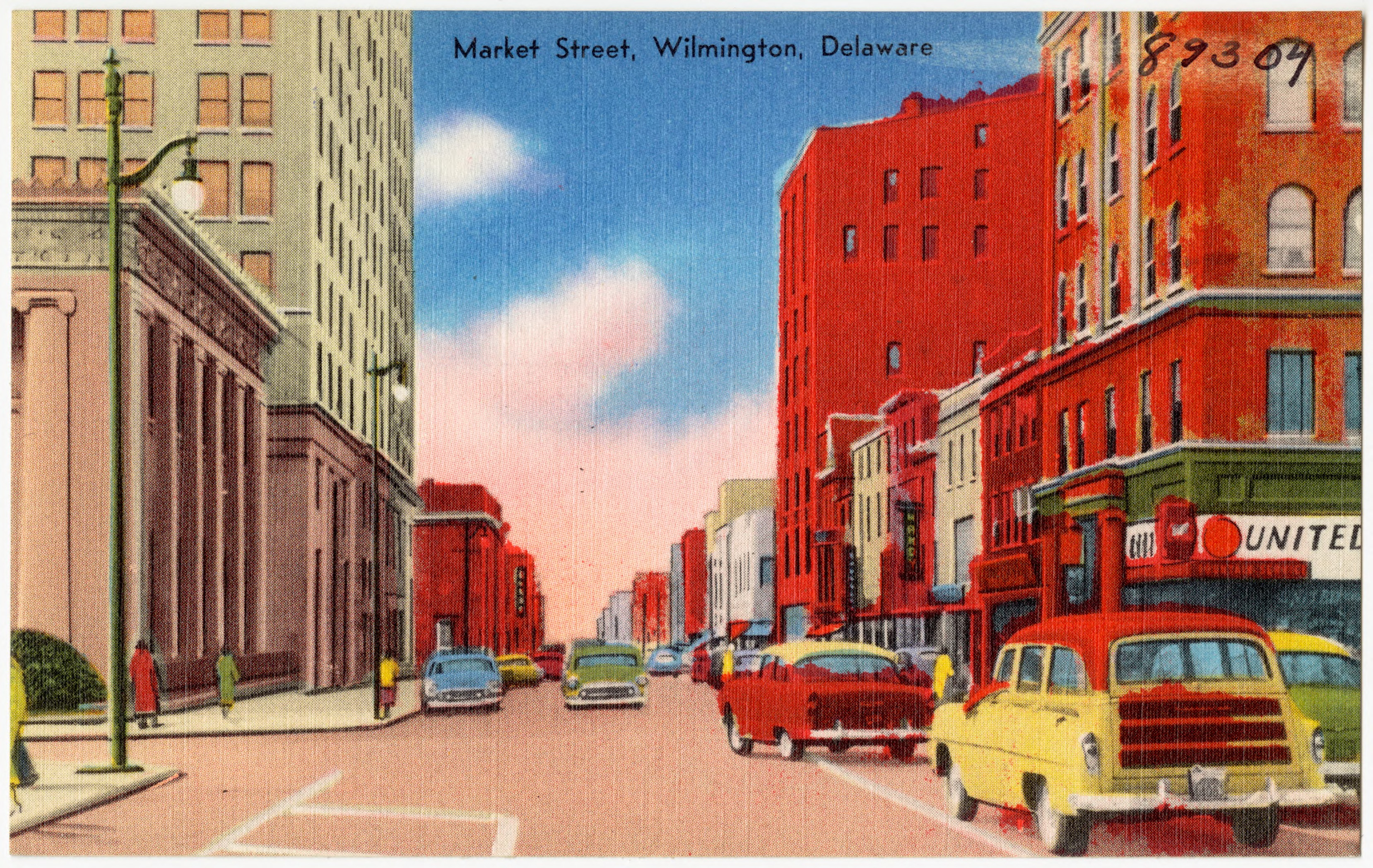
Antique postcard looking south (circa 1930-1945)

== See also ==
- Lower Market Street Historic District
- Rodney Square Historic District
- National Register of Historic Places listings in Wilmington, Delaware
