= Lower Market Street Historic District =

Historic district in Delaware, United States

- U.S. National Register of Historic Places
- U.S. Historic district
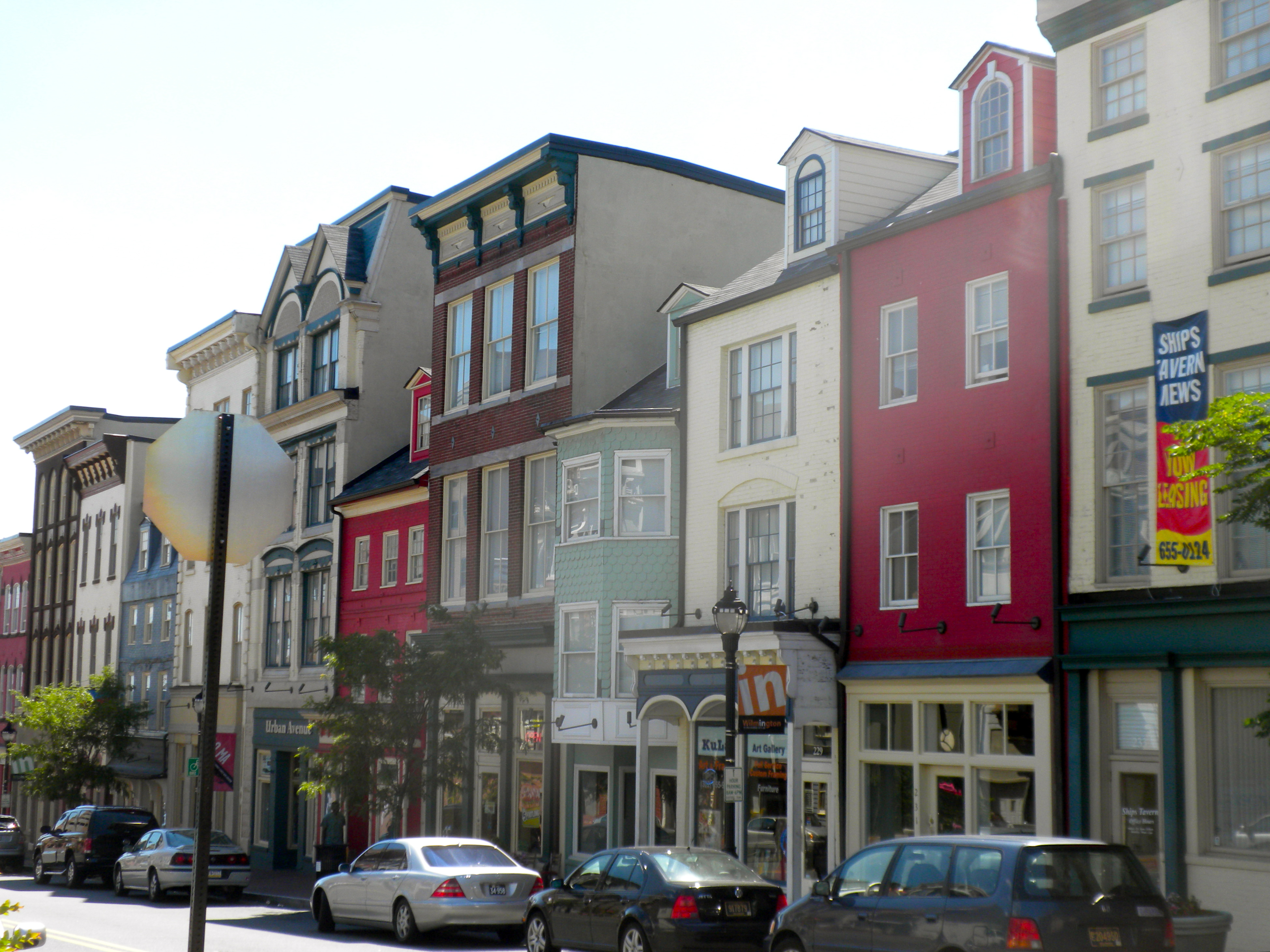
- 200 bk N. Market Street, June 2010

- Location within Delaware Location within the United States
- Location: Market St., Wilmington, Delaware
- Coordinates: 39°44′21″N 75°33′07″W
- Area: 13 acres (5.3 ha)
- Architect: Royer Bros.
- Architectural style: Classical Revival, Greek Revival, Art Deco, Late 19th And 20th Century Revivals, Late Victorian, Federal
- NRHP reference No.: 80000936, 85000314 (Boundary Increase)
- Added to NRHP: May 15, 1980, February 21, 1985 (Boundary Increase)

Lower Market Street Historic District is a national historic district located at Wilmington, New Castle County, Delaware. It encompasses 132 contributing buildings the central business district of Wilmington. It includes attached commercial and commercial/residential structures dating from the mid-18th to the early-20th century. The buildings reflect a variety of popular architectural styles including Classical Revival, Greek Revival, Federal, and Art Deco. Notable buildings include the Farmers Bank (1912), Jake's Market (c. 1870), Wilmington and Brandywine Bank, Joshua Conner and Sons, J.T. Montgomery Jewelry Store, and Wilmington Publishing Company Building.

It was added to the National Register of Historic Places in 1980, with a boundary increase in 1985.

Market Street looking North from Eighth, Wilmington, Delaware. about 1906

== See also ==
- Downtown Wilmington Commercial Historic District
- National Register of Historic Places listings in Wilmington, Delaware
