= Philips-Thompson Buildings =

- U.S. National Register of Historic Places
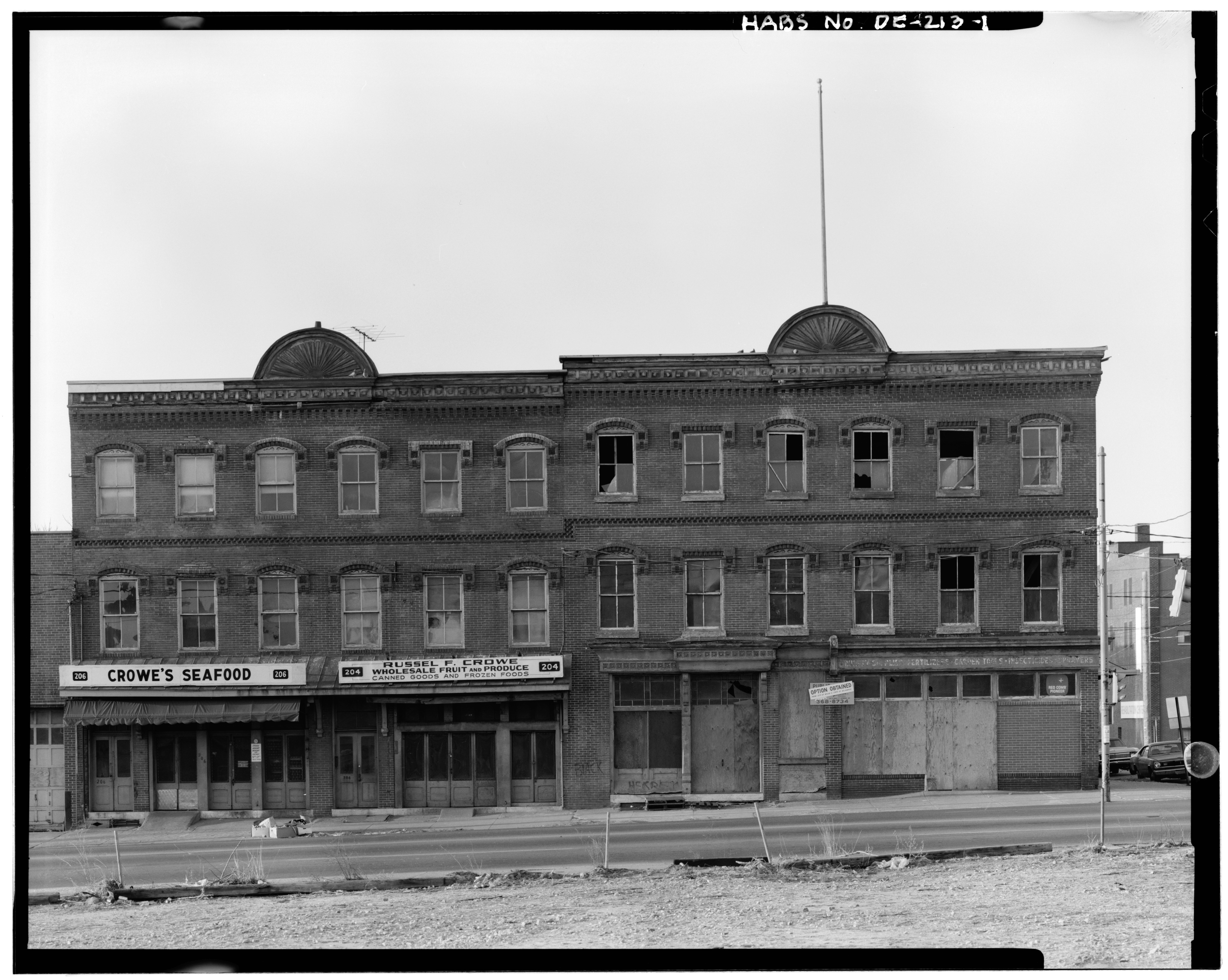
- The former buildings

- Location within Delaware Location within the United States
- Location: 200-206 E. 4th St., Wilmington, Delaware
- Coordinates: 39°44′22″N 75°32′59″W
- Area: 0.2 acres (0.081 ha)
- Built: c. 1884
- NRHP reference No.: 80000937
- Added to NRHP: April 16, 1980

Philips-Thompson Buildings was a set of two historic commercial buildings located at Wilmington, New Castle County, Delaware. They were built about 1884, and were two three-story, red brick buildings. They had a row of square decorative terra cotta tiles divides the second and third stories. They featured a corbelled brick cornice and sunburst decorations capping the central bays. The buildings housed a wholesale farm supply company, wholesale grocers and produce shops. It was added to the National Register of Historic Places in 1980.

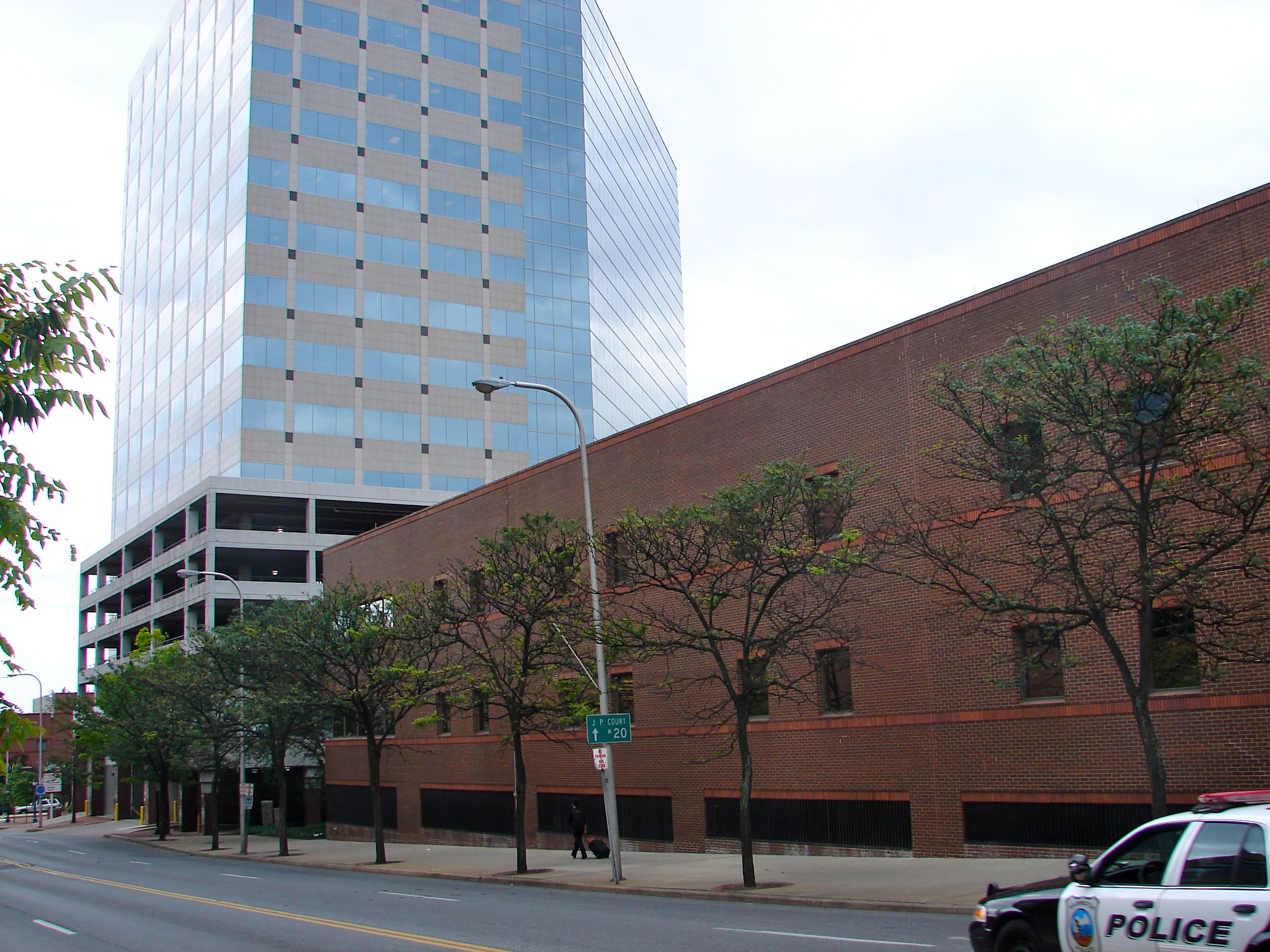
Former site within Chase Bank complex

The buildings have been demolished. A two-story office building now sits on the site that was originally built for First Chicago Bank but is now occupied by Chase Bank.
