= Woodward Houses =

Historic houses in Delaware, United States

- U.S. National Register of Historic Places
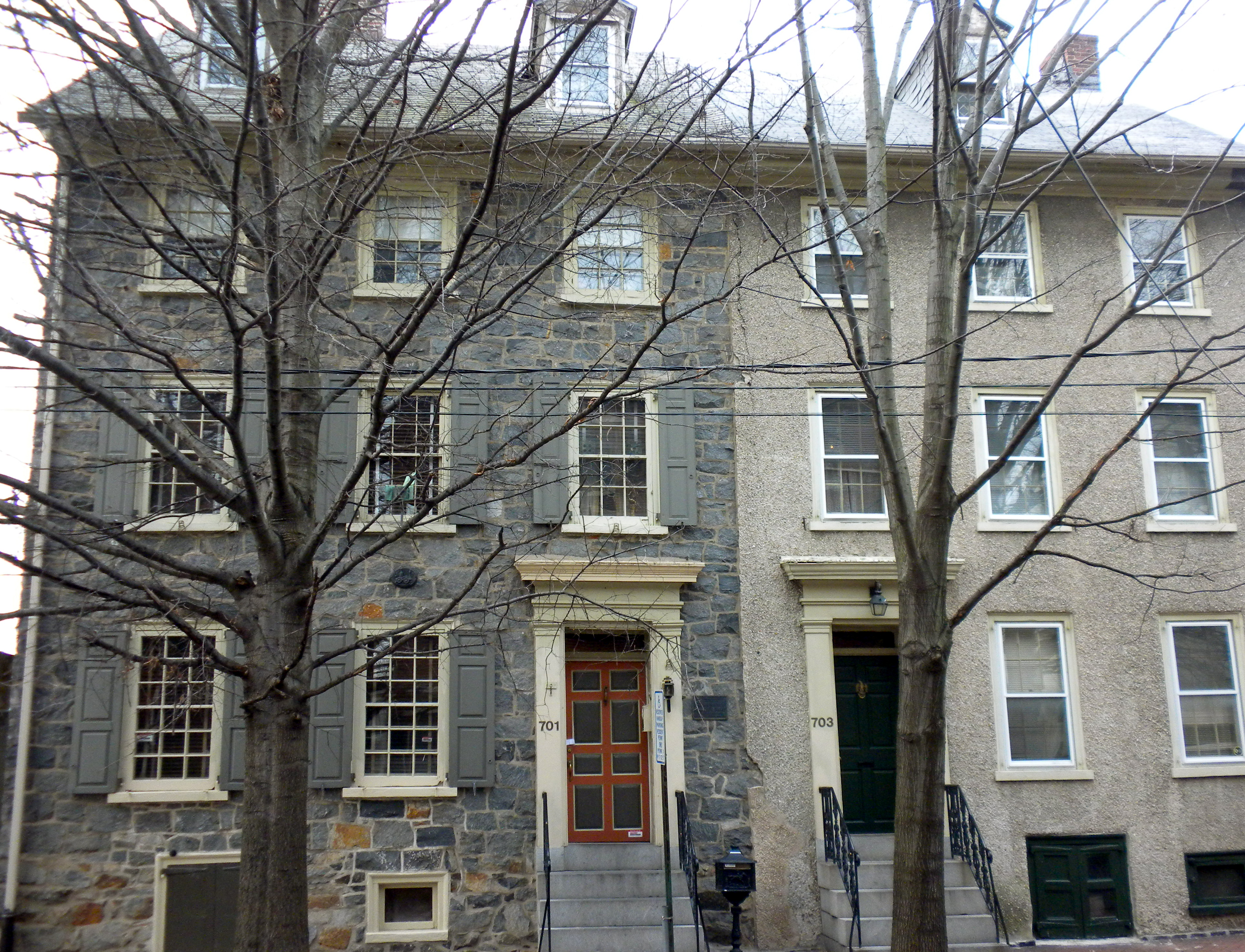
- Woodward Houses, January 2010

- Location within Delaware Location within the United States
- Location: 701-703 West St., Wilmington, Delaware
- Coordinates: 39°44′39″N 75°33′10″W
- Area: 0.4 acres (0.16 ha)
- Built: c. 1745, 1760
- Architectural style: Georgian
- NRHP reference No.: 79000639
- Added to NRHP: April 20, 1979

Woodward Houses are two historic homes located at Wilmington, New Castle County, Delaware. The house at 701 West Street was built about 1745, and is a 3 1/2-story, three-bay, quarried granite dwelling with a gable roof. It has an L-shaped, side-hall plan. The house at 703 West Street was built about 1760, and is a 3 1/2-story, three-bay, stuccoed stone dwelling with a gable roof. It is three feet shorter in both length and width than 701. Its interior was altered in the mid-19th century and then in the 1930s to accommodate apartment dwellings. They are excellent examples of the Georgian style. The houses were probably built by Joseph Woodward, a Quaker ropemaker from West Chester, Pennsylvania. There is a legend that the house at 703 contains a hearthstone which was a section of the platform where Thomas Jefferson stood to read the Declaration of Independence to the people of Philadelphia.

The houses were added to the National Register of Historic Places in 1979.
