= Max Keil Building (712 N. Market Street) =

- U.S. National Register of Historic Places
- U.S. Historic district – Contributing property
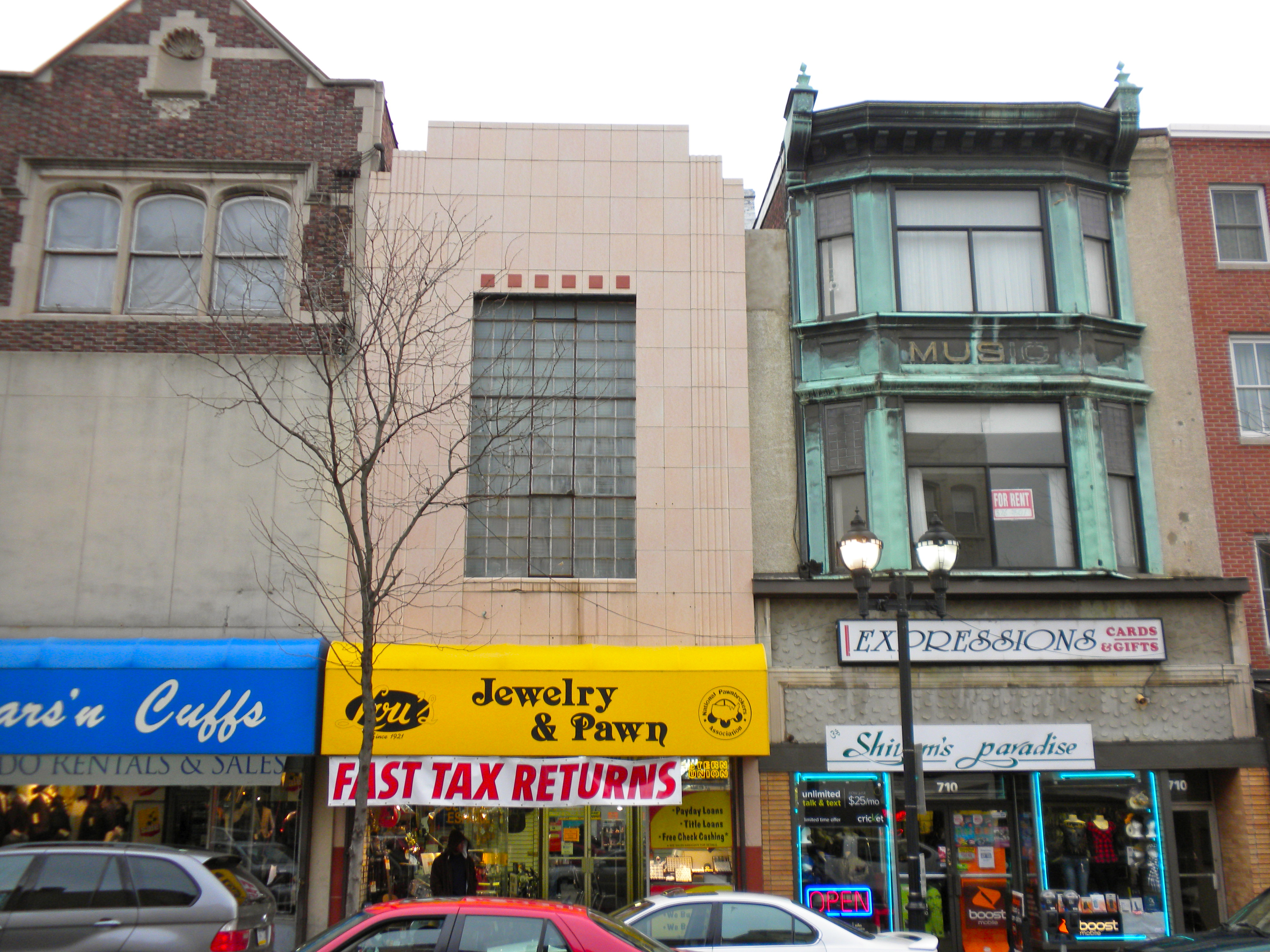
- Max Keil Building, January 2010

- Location within Delaware Location within the United States
- Location: 712 N. Market St., Wilmington, Delaware
- Coordinates: 39.742928°N 75.549219°W
- Area: 0.1 acres (0.040 ha)
- Built: 1850, 1938
- Architectural style: Moderne, Art Deco
- Part of: Downtown Wilmington Commercial Historic District (ID10000079)
- MPS: Market Street MRA
- NRHP reference No.: 85000152

Significant dates
- Added to NRHP: January 30, 1985
- Designated CP: March 24, 2017

Max Keil Building is a historic commercial building located at Wilmington, New Castle County, Delaware. It was built about 1850, and modified in the Art Moderne / Art Deco style in 1938. It is a three-story, single-bay commercial building with a rectangular plan built of wall bearing brick construction. The front facade features a large curved glass display window on the first floor and an austere, peach-colored terra-cotta wall with a large rectangular window of structural glass block at the second and third floors.

It was added to the National Register of Historic Places in 1985.

== See also ==
- Max Keil Building (700 N. Market Street)
- National Register of Historic Places listings in Wilmington, Delaware
