= Torbert Street Livery Stables =

- U.S. National Register of Historic Places
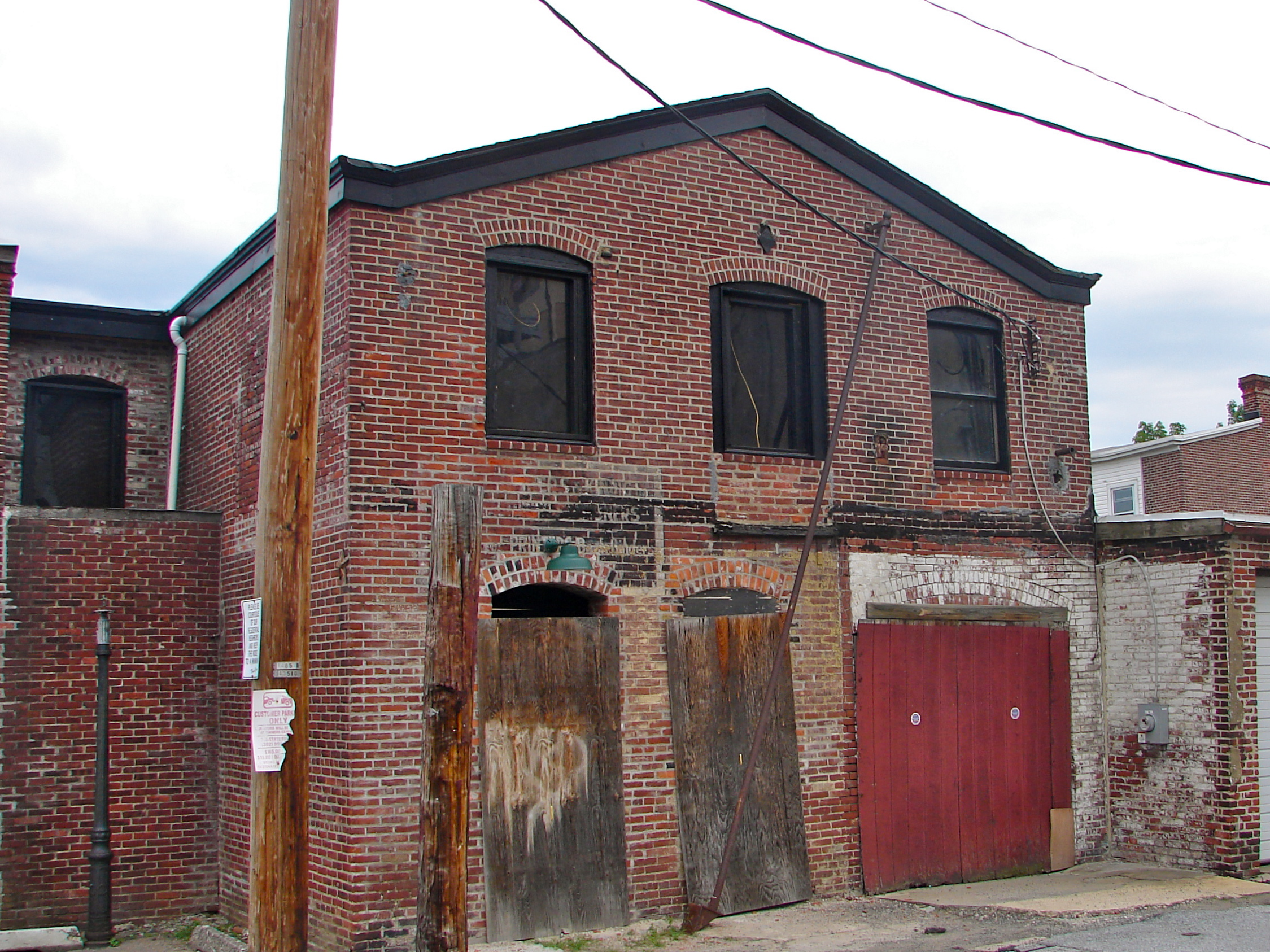
- Torbert Street Livery Stables, June 2011

- Location within Delaware Location within the United States
- Location: 305-307 Torbert St., Wilmington, Delaware
- Coordinates: 39.749234°N 75.549773°W
- Area: less than one acre
- Built: 1887
- Architectural style: Late Victorian
- NRHP reference No.: 98001095
- Added to NRHP: September 14, 1998

Torbert Street Livery Stables, also known as Hercules Powder Company Printing Department, Charles Printing Co., Wilmington Motorcycle Club, Cann Bros & Kindig Printers, and Barclay Bros Printing, is a historic livery stable located at Wilmington, New Castle County, Delaware. It was built in 1887, and consists of two separately-built, two-story livery stables, joined and expanded through additions and internal alterations. A connecting hyphen was built during or after 1946. Both structures are constructed of brick and have gable roofs. The interior consists of large open spaces supported by cast iron columns and historic wood beams reinforced with iron rods. Also on the property is a contributing cast iron street lamp. The buildings housed livery stables into the early 20th century, after which they were occupied as a cabinet-making shop, a cycle club, auto garages, commercial and corporate printing facilities, and a warehouse.

It was added to the National Register of Historic Places in 1998.
