= Max Keil Building (700 N. Market Street) =

- U.S. National Register of Historic Places
- U.S. Historic district – Contributing property
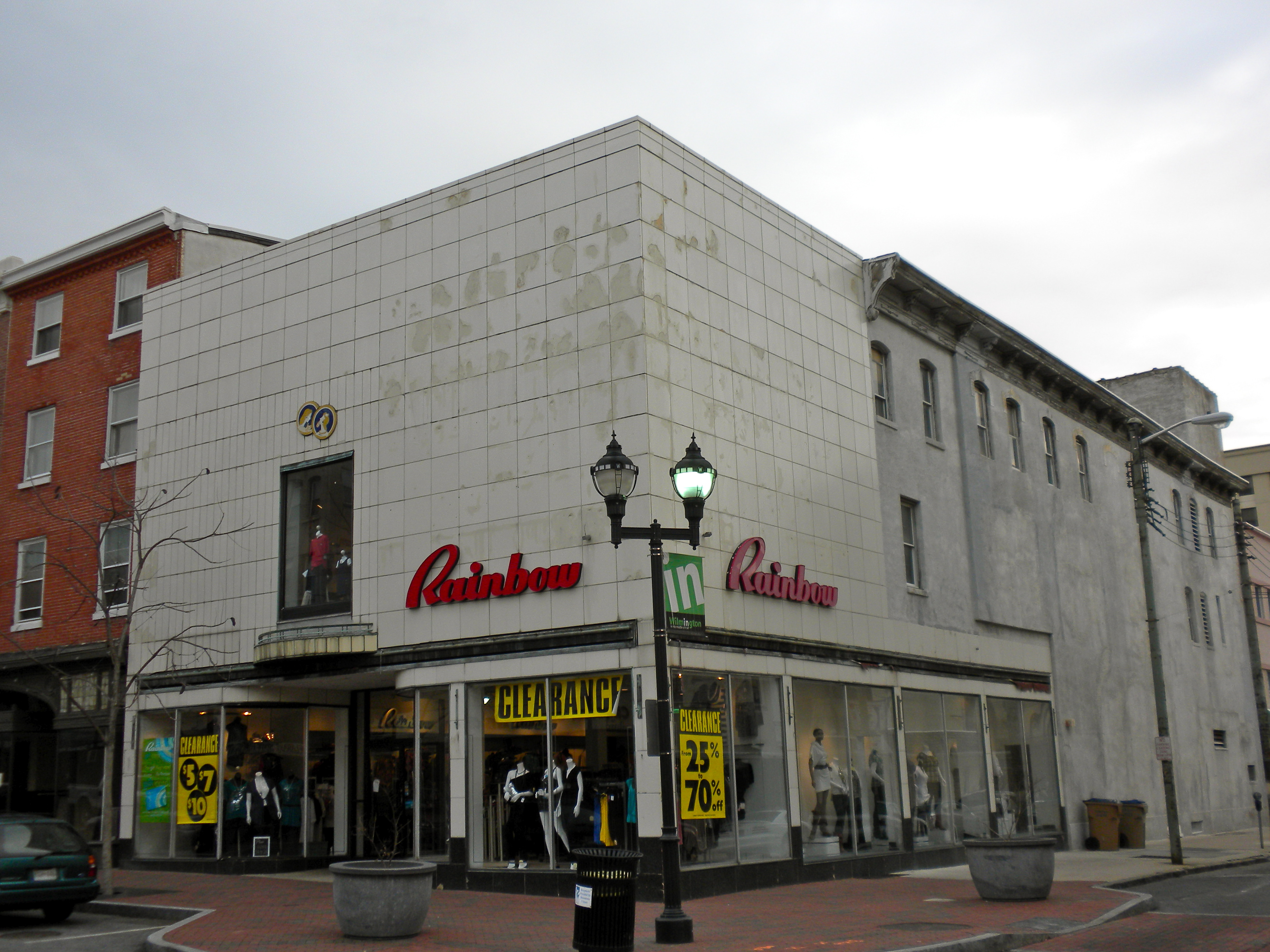
- Max Keil Building, January 2010

- Location within Delaware Location within the United States
- Coordinates: 39.742650°N 75.549405°W
- Area: 0.1 acres (0.040 ha)
- Built: 1938
- Architect: Ballinger, H. M.
- Architectural style: Moderne
- Part of: Downtown Wilmington Commercial Historic District (ID10000079)
- MPS: Market Street MRA (64000105)
- NRHP reference No.: 85000153

Significant dates
- Added to NRHP: January 30, 1985
- Designated CP: March 24, 2017

Max Keil Building is a historic commercial building located at Wilmington, New Castle County, Delaware. It was built about 1875, and modified in the Art Moderne/Art Deco style in 1938. It is a three-story, single-bay commercial building with a rectangular plan built of wall bearing brick construction. The front facade features large display windows on the first floor and an austere, peach-colored terra-cotta wall with a large rectangular display window at the second and third floors. In 2010, it was occupied by an outlet of Rainbow Shops.

It was added to the National Register of Historic Places in 1985.

== See also ==
- Max Keil Building (712 N. Market Street)
- National Register of Historic Places listings in Wilmington, Delaware
