= Braunstein's Building =

- U.S. National Register of Historic Places
- U.S. Historic district – Contributing property
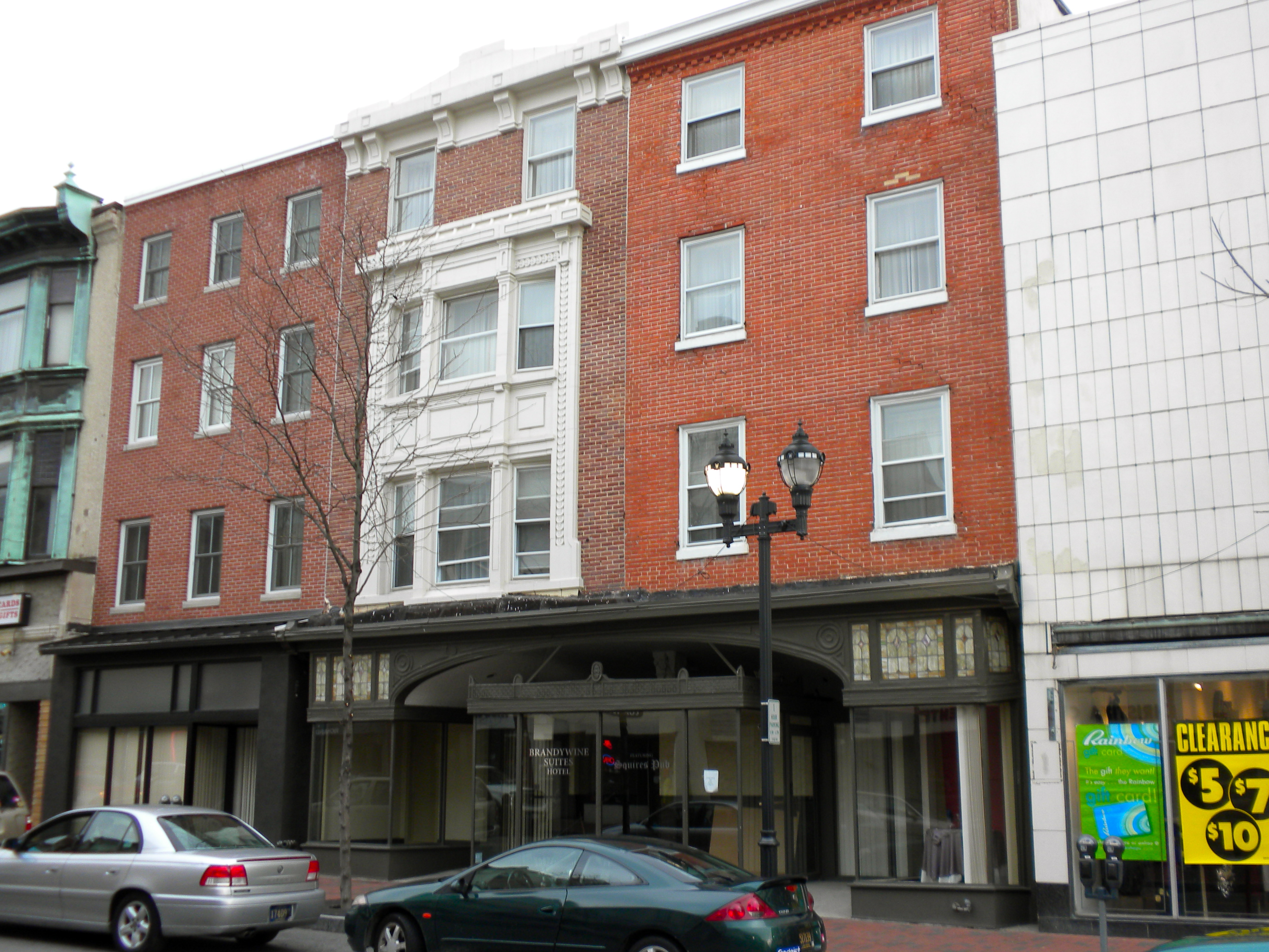
- Braunstein Building, January 2010

- Location within Delaware Location within the United States
- Location: 704-706 N. Market St., Wilmington, Delaware
- Coordinates: 39.742764°N 75.549287°W
- Area: 0.1 acres (0.040 ha)
- Built: c. 1900, 1924
- Architectural style: Beaux Arts
- Part of: Downtown Wilmington Commercial Historic District (ID10000079)
- MPS: Market Street MRA (64000105)
- NRHP reference No.: 85003190

Significant dates
- Added to NRHP: December 19, 1985
- Designated CP: March 24, 2017

Braunstein's Building is a historic commercial building located in Wilmington, New Castle County, Delaware. It consists of two buildings built about 1900, and combined in 1924 as a single unit. The building at 704 is a four-story, two bay brick commercial building and the buildings at 706 is a four-story, three bay brick commercial building. It features a unifying first floor display window made of pressed metal, with accents of raised bands, panels with basket weave design, and stained glass in the Beaux Arts style. The storefront was added in 1924.

It was added to the National Register of Historic Places in 1985.
