= Charles Schagrin Building =

Historic building in Delaware, US

- U.S. National Register of Historic Places
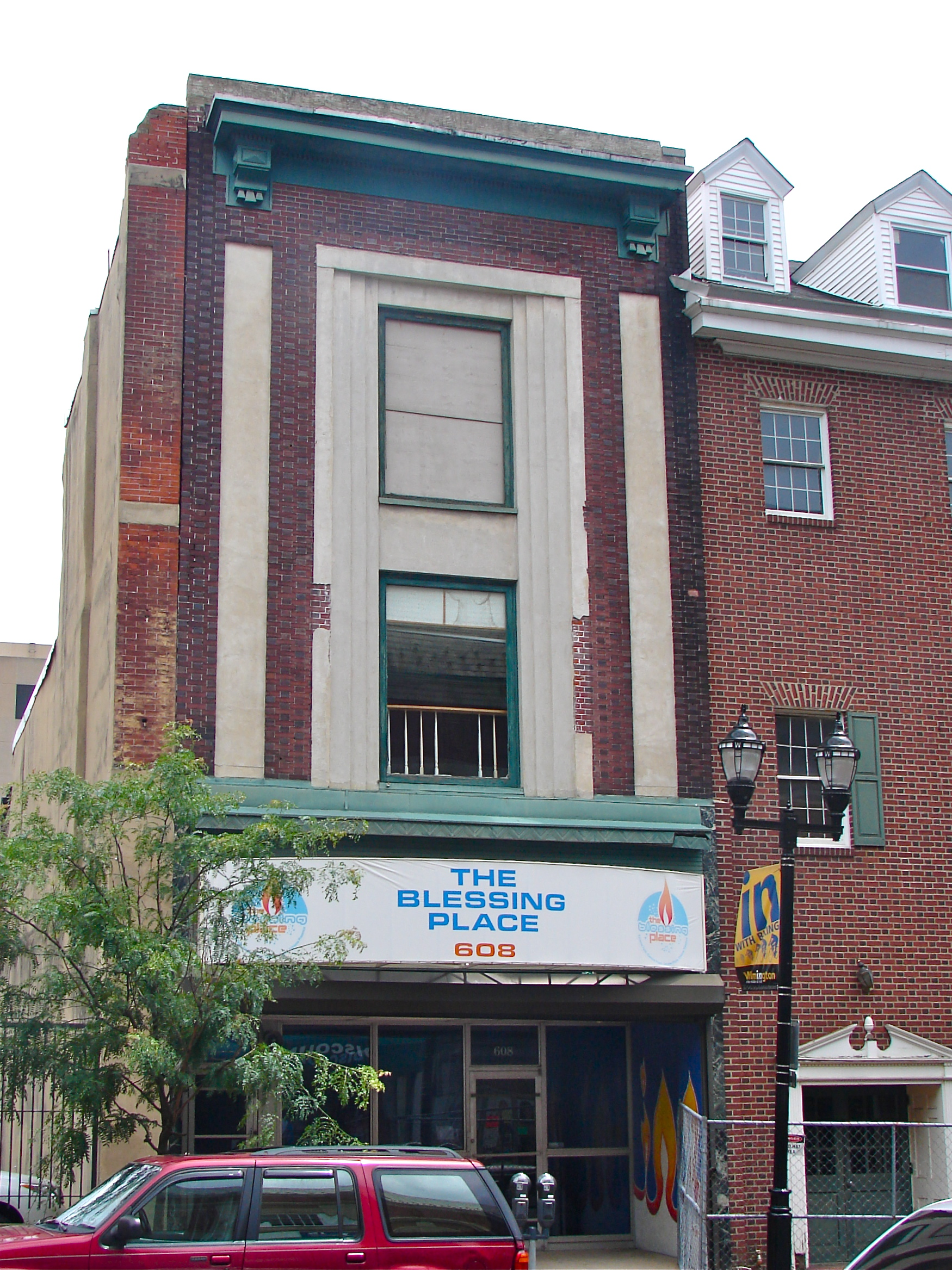
- Charles Schagrin Building, June 2011

- Location within Delaware Location within the United States
- Location: 608 N. Market St., Wilmington, Delaware
- Coordinates: 39.742220°N 75.549788°W
- Area: 0.1 acres (0.040 ha)
- Built: 1918, 1948
- Architectural style: Art Deco
- MPS: Market Street MRA
- NRHP reference No.: 85000156
- Added to NRHP: January 30, 1985

Charles Schagrin Building is a historic commercial building located in Wilmington, New Castle County, Delaware. It was built in the first quarter of the 19th century, with a new facade added in 1918, and modified again in 1948. It is a three-story, single bay commercial building with a rectangular plan built of wall bearing brick construction. The building features a recessed display window, vertical black granite strips on both sides of the building, a stuccoed sign framed by horizontal copper bands, a large single-light central window with a stepped concrete window frame, and is in the Art Deco style.

Charles Schagrin was an immigrant from Austria who came to the United States in the late 1800's, working as a peddler before settling in Wilmington, Delaware and opening a women's clothing store.

The building was added to the National Register of Historic Places in 1985.
