= Postles House =

Historic house in Delaware, United States

- U.S. National Register of Historic Places
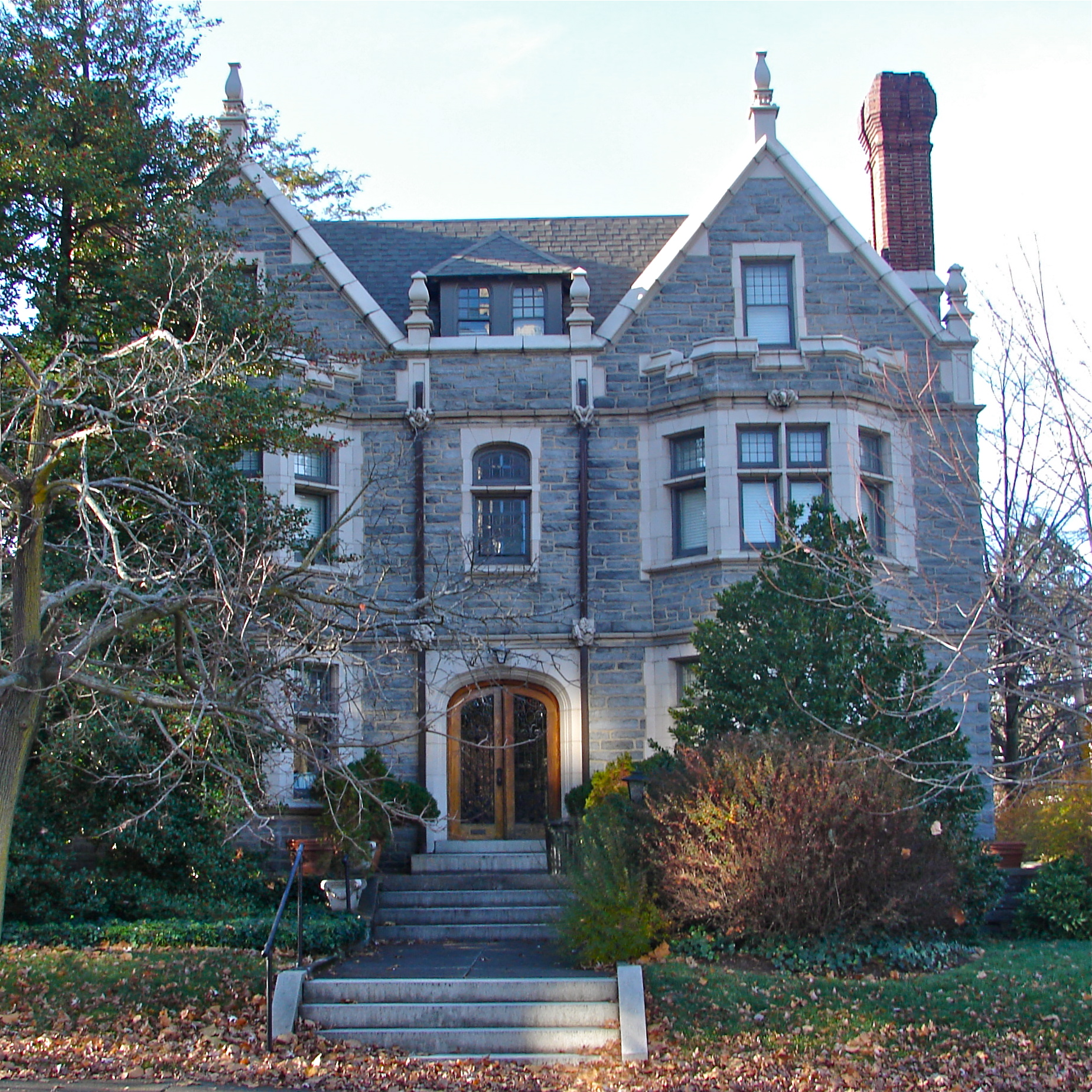
- Postles House, November 2010

- Location within Delaware Location within the United States
- Location: 1007 N. Broom St., Wilmington, Delaware
- Coordinates: 39.752355°N 75.562016°W
- Area: 0.3 acres (0.12 ha)
- Built: 1905
- Architectural style: Tudor Revival, Gothic
- NRHP reference No.: 82001028
- Added to NRHP: November 12, 1982

Postles House, also known as "The Gargoyle House", is a historic home located at Wilmington, New Castle County, Delaware. It was built in 1905, and is a three-story, T-shaped stone dwelling with eclectic Tudor Gothic style elements. It features two-story polygonal bays topped with battlements, steep parapeted gables, decorative wrought iron work, and a slate roof. Also on the property are a contributing carriage house.

It was added to the National Register of Historic Places in 1982.
