= Charles Gray Printing Shop =

- U.S. National Register of Historic Places
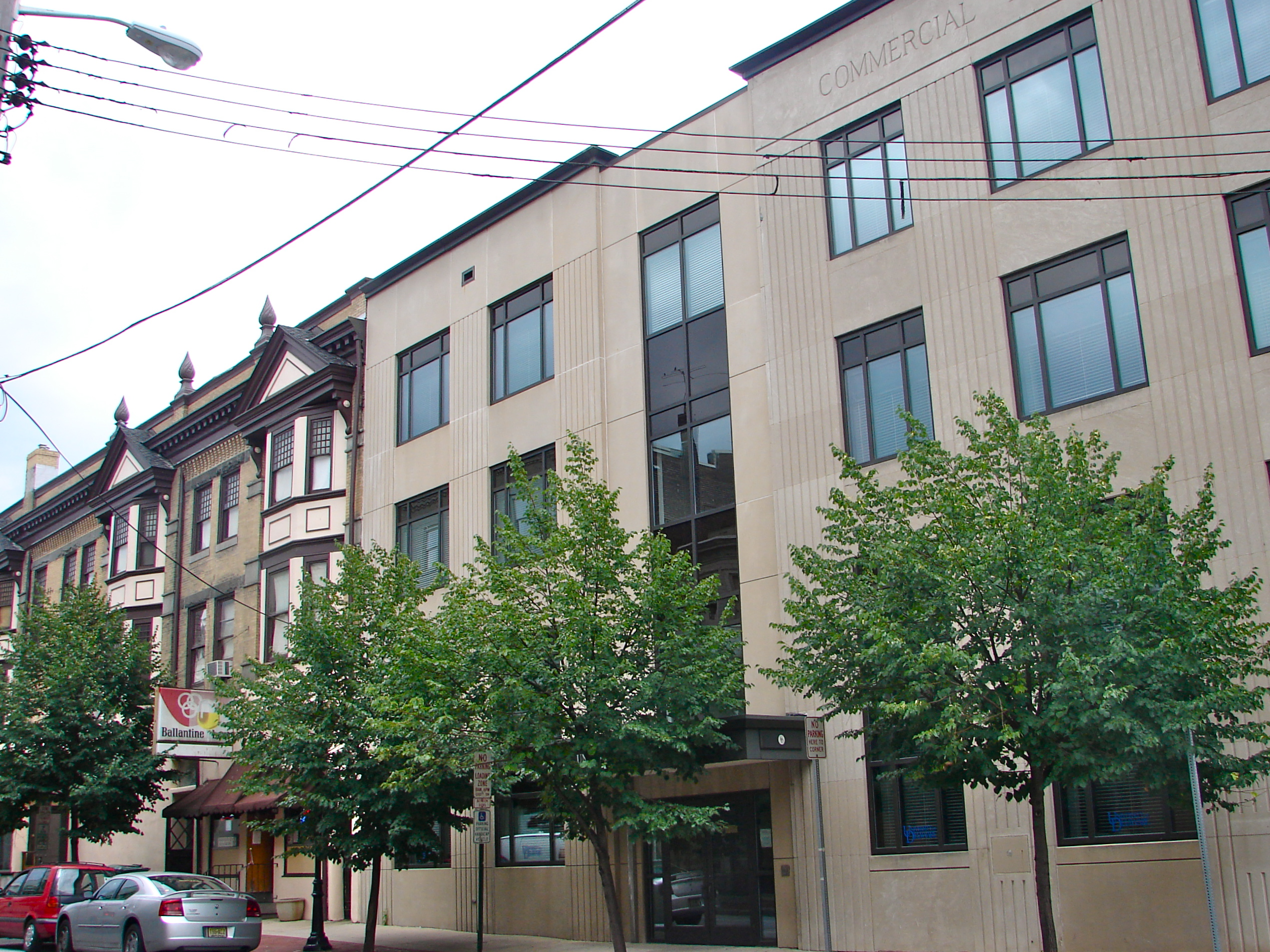
- Former Gray Printing Building, June 2011

- Location within Delaware Location within the United States
- Location: 11 E. 8th St., Wilmington, Delaware
- Coordinates: 39.743252°N 75.548498°W
- Area: 0.1 acres (0.040 ha)
- Built: 1874
- Architectural style: Italianate
- MPS: Market Street MRA
- NRHP reference No.: 85000151
- Added to NRHP: January 30, 1985

Charles Gray Printing Shop was a historic commercial building located at Wilmington, New Castle County, Delaware. It was built in 1874, and was a three-story, commercial/office building with a rectangular plan built of wall bearing brick construction. It featured a half-octagonal display window and is in the Italianate style. The building was demolished and replaced with an office of the University of Delaware.

It was added to the National Register of Historic Places in 1985.
