= Eighth Street Park Historic District =

Historic district in Delaware, United States

- U.S. National Register of Historic Places
- U.S. Historic district
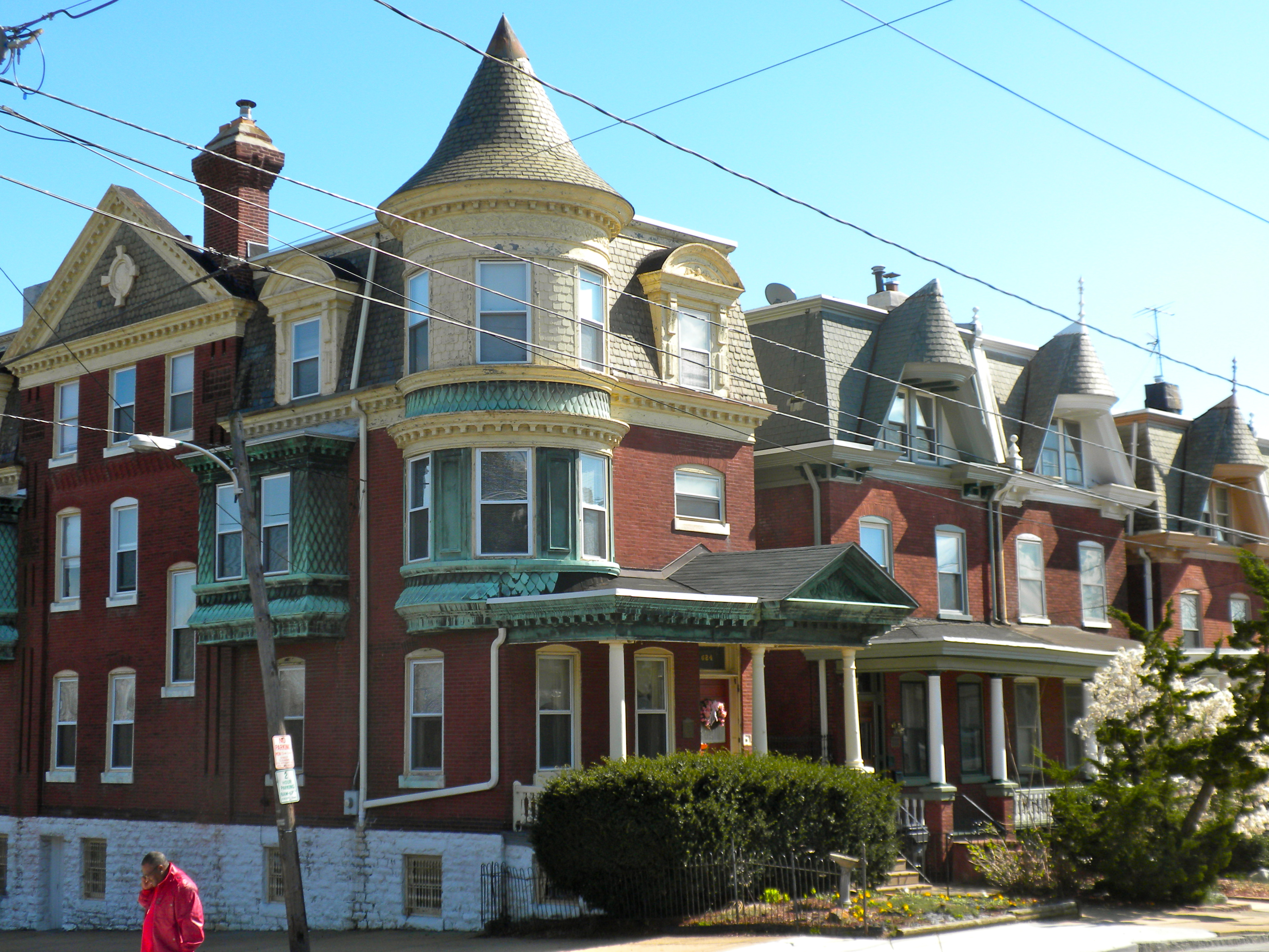
- Houses in Eighth Street Park Historic District, March 2010

- Location within Delaware Location within the United States
- Location: Roughly bounded by 6th, 10th, Harrison, and Broom Sts., Wilmington, Delaware
- Coordinates: 39°44′56″N 75°33′47″W
- Area: 39 acres (16 ha)
- Built: 1865
- Architectural style: Mixed (more Than 2 Styles From Different Periods), Second Empire
- NRHP reference No.: 83001334, 84000841 (Boundary Increase)
- Added to NRHP: August 4, 1983, May 3, 1984 (Boundary Increase)

Eighth Street Park Historic District, also known as Tilton Park Historic District, is a national historic district located at Wilmington, New Castle County, Delaware. It encompasses 208 contributing buildings located around Eighth Street Park in Wilmington. It is a primarily residential district developed in the late-19th and early-20th century. They include rowhouse, semi-detached, and detached dwellings are in a variety of popular styles including Second Empire and Queen Anne. The oldest house is the James Tilton house (1802), home of Surgeon General of the United States Army James Tilton. Also located in the district is the Second Baptist Church.

It was added to the National Register of Historic Places in 1983, with a boundary increase in 1984.
