= Rodney Court =

- U.S. National Register of Historic Places
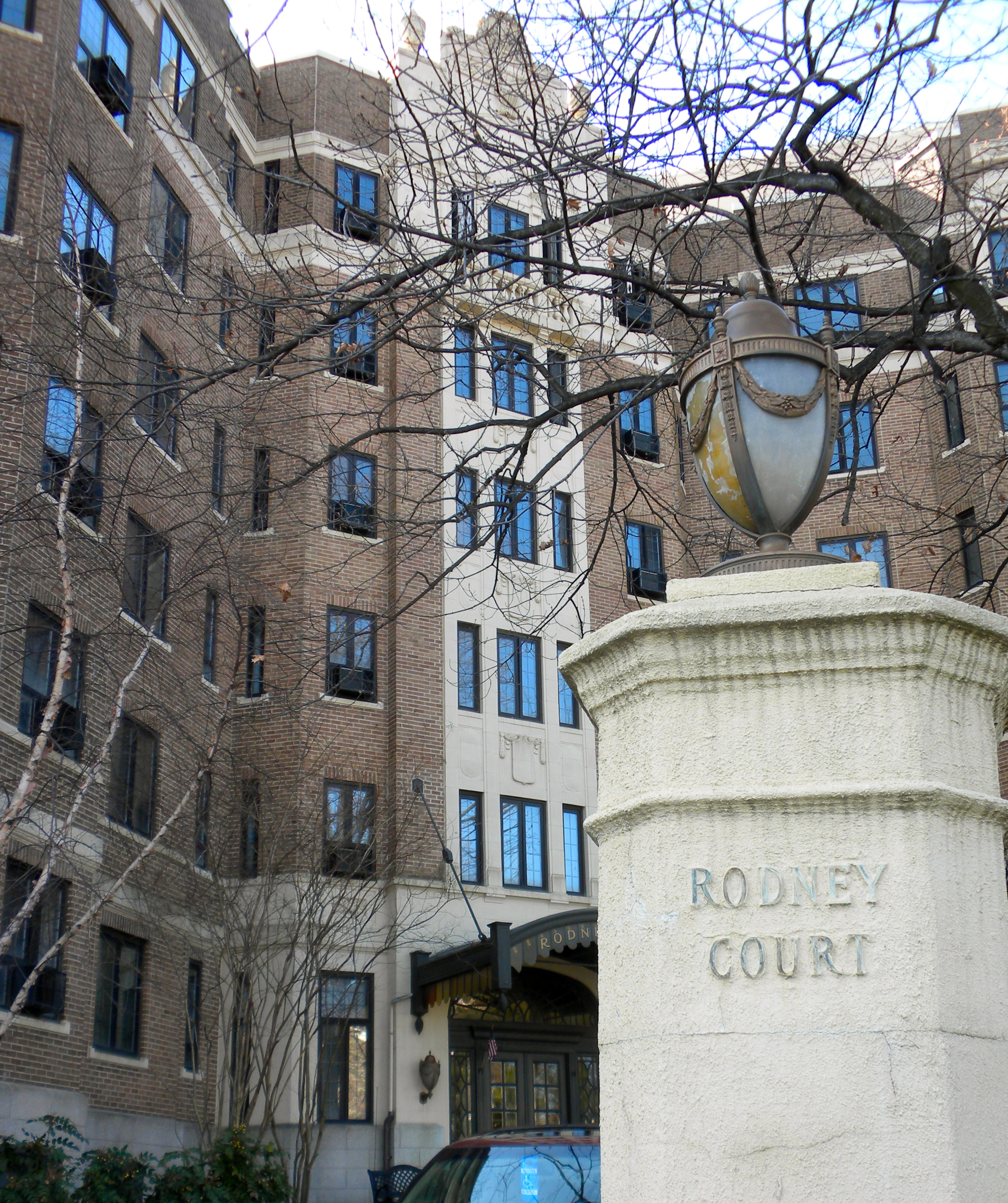
- Rodney Court, March 2010

- Location within Delaware Location within the United States
- Location: 1100 Pennsylvania Ave., Wilmington, Delaware
- Coordinates: 39.752350°N 75.557039°W
- Area: 0.5 acres (0.20 ha)
- Built: 1928
- Built by: VanSant Brothers
- Architect: Hance, Wallace
- NRHP reference No.: 80000938
- Added to NRHP: April 2, 1980

Rodney Court, also known as Rodney Court Co-operative, is a historic apartment building located at Wilmington, New Castle County, Delaware.

== Career ==
Rodney Court was built in 1928, and is a six-story, L-shaped steel frame apartment building. The frame is sheathed in cinder block and faced with light-colored tapestry bricks. It features cast-stone trimmings with classical motifs and an elaborate cast-stone classically styled parapet.

It once had a large social hall adjoining a rooftop dance floor and roof garden, that has since been converted to a penthouse apartment. It is the last extant luxury apartment built in Wilmington before the Great Depression of the 1930s.

It was added to the National Register of Historic Places in 1980.
