= Henry Townsend Building =

- U.S. National Register of Historic Places
- U.S. Historic district – Contributing property
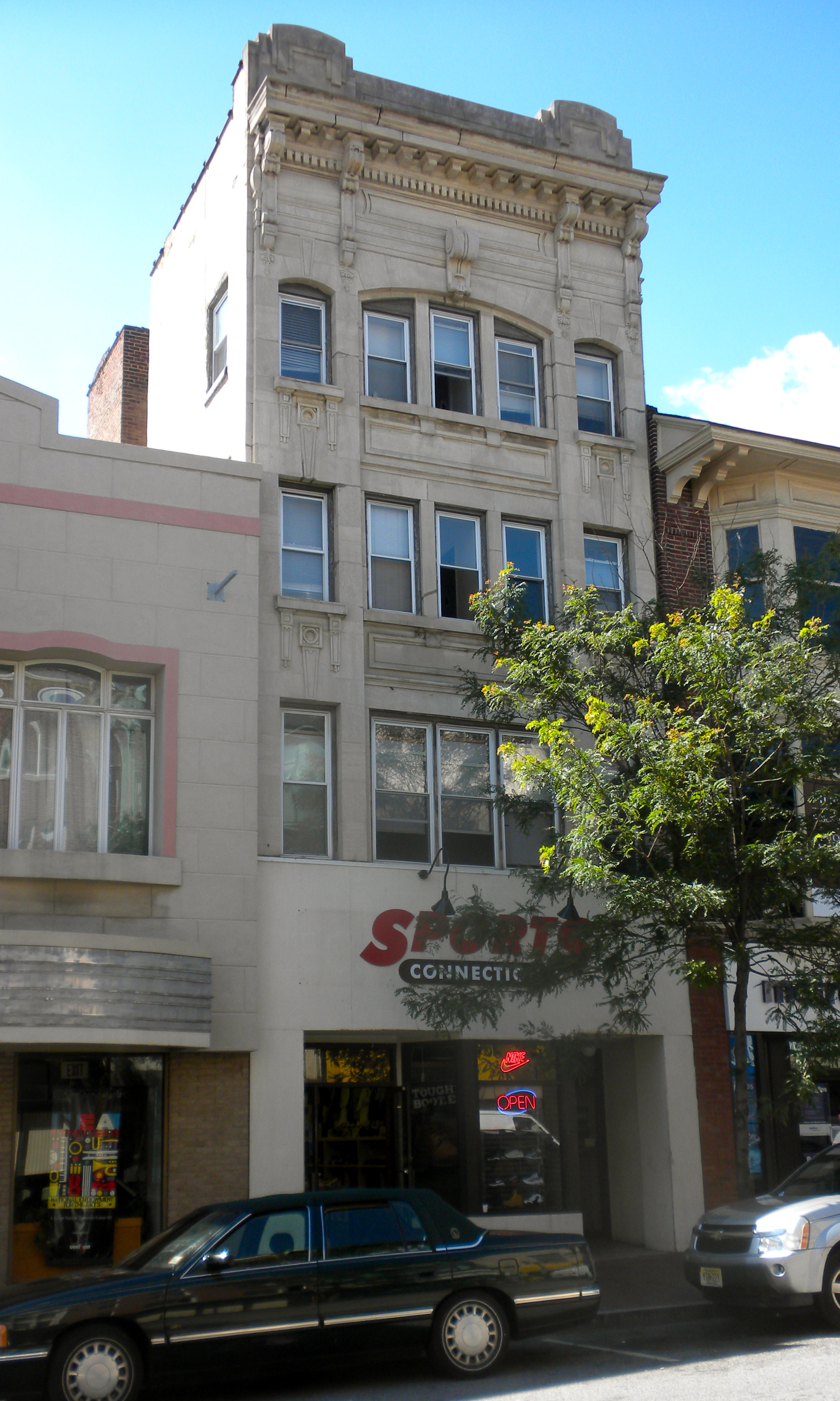
- Henry Townsend Building, June 2010

- Location within Delaware Location within the United States
- Location: 709 N. Market St., Wilmington, Delaware
- Coordinates: 39.743068°N 75.549779°W
- Area: 0.1 acres (0.040 ha)
- Built: 1913-1914
- Architectural style: Renaissance, Beaux Arts
- Part of: Downtown Wilmington Commercial Historic District (ID10000079)
- MPS: Market Street MRA (64000105)
- NRHP reference No.: 85000157

Significant dates
- Added to NRHP: January 30, 1985
- Designated CP: March 24, 2017

Henry Townsend Building is a historic commercial/residential building located at Wilmington, New Castle County, Delaware. It was built in 1913–1914, and is a four-story, five bay commercial apartment building with a rectangular plan built of wall bearing brick construction. It features a limestone facade with ornate denticulated cornice supported by four large brackets in the Beaux Arts style. Between 1922 and 1964, the first floor was used as a W. T. Grant Department Store.

It was added to the National Register of Historic Places in 1985.
