= St. Nicholas Ukrainian Catholic Church (Wilmington, Delaware) =

- U.S. National Register of Historic Places
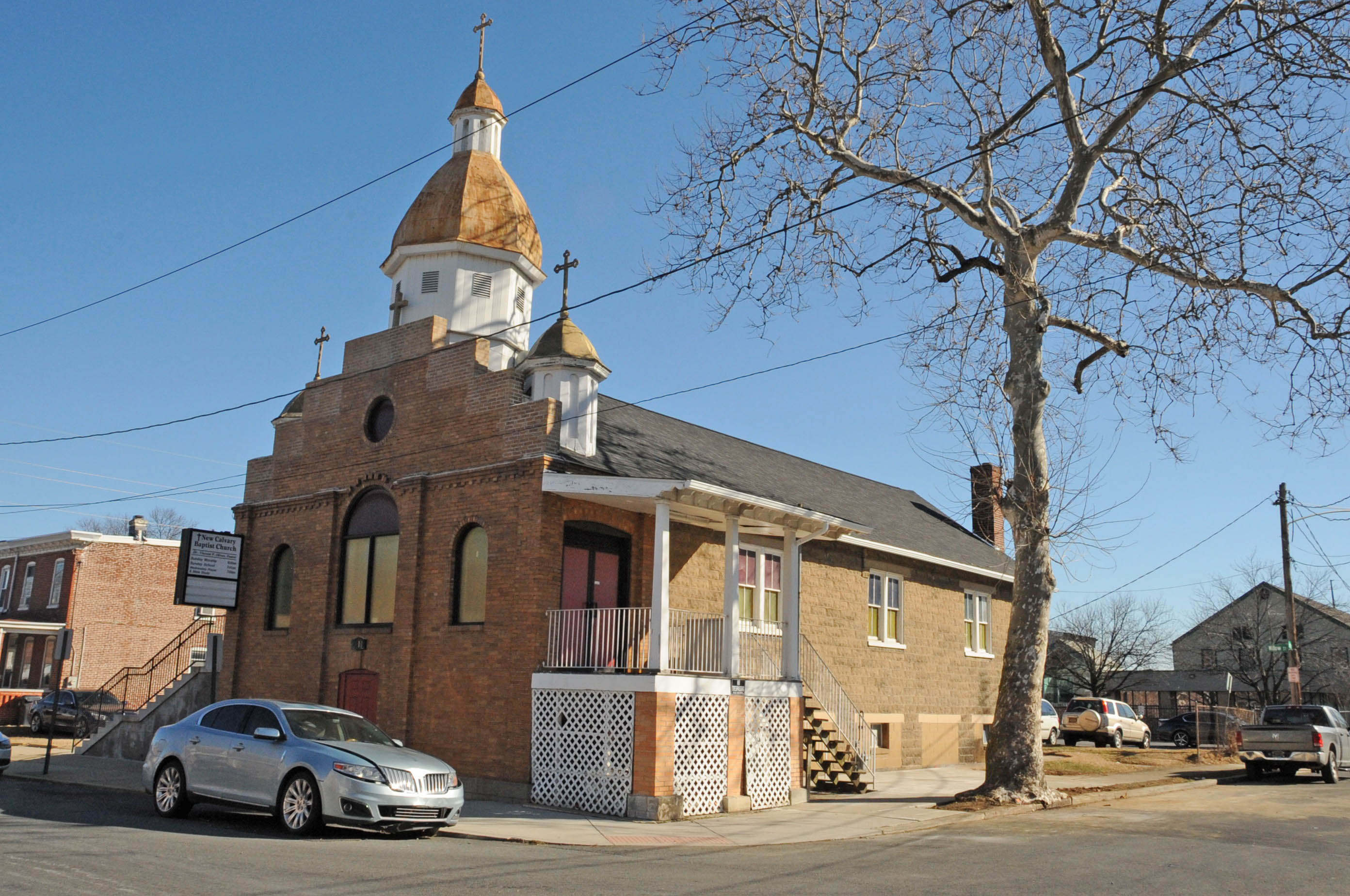
- St. Nicholas Ukrainian Catholic Church, January 30, 2021

- Location within Delaware Location within the United States
- Location: 610 South Heald St., Wilmington, Delaware
- Coordinates: 39.7277°N 75.5449°W
- NRHP reference No.: 100006071
- Added to NRHP: 2021-01-25

The St. Nicholas Ukrainian Catholic Church was built in 1909 to serve the growing immigrant community. Preceding World War I, Wilmington experienced an exponential influx of new residents from Ukraine. The neighborhood that subsenquently became known as “Little Ukraine” was home to Saints Peter and Paul Ukrainian Orthodox Church, and also to St. Nicholas Ukrainian Catholic Church.

The church became the pulse of the Ukrainian community, serving as a gathering place for debates and resolutions on current events both local and national.

Eventually, the church membership outgrew the capacity of the structure to accommodate all, and in 1968 erected a new building on Miller Road and Lea Boulevard. The South Heald St. structure was eventually sold to the New Calvary Baptist Church.

== See also ==
- Ukrainian Catholic Church
- St. Nicholas Ukrainian Catholic Church (Watervliet, New York)
