= Foord & Massey Furniture Company Building =

- U.S. National Register of Historic Places
- U.S. Historic district – Contributing property
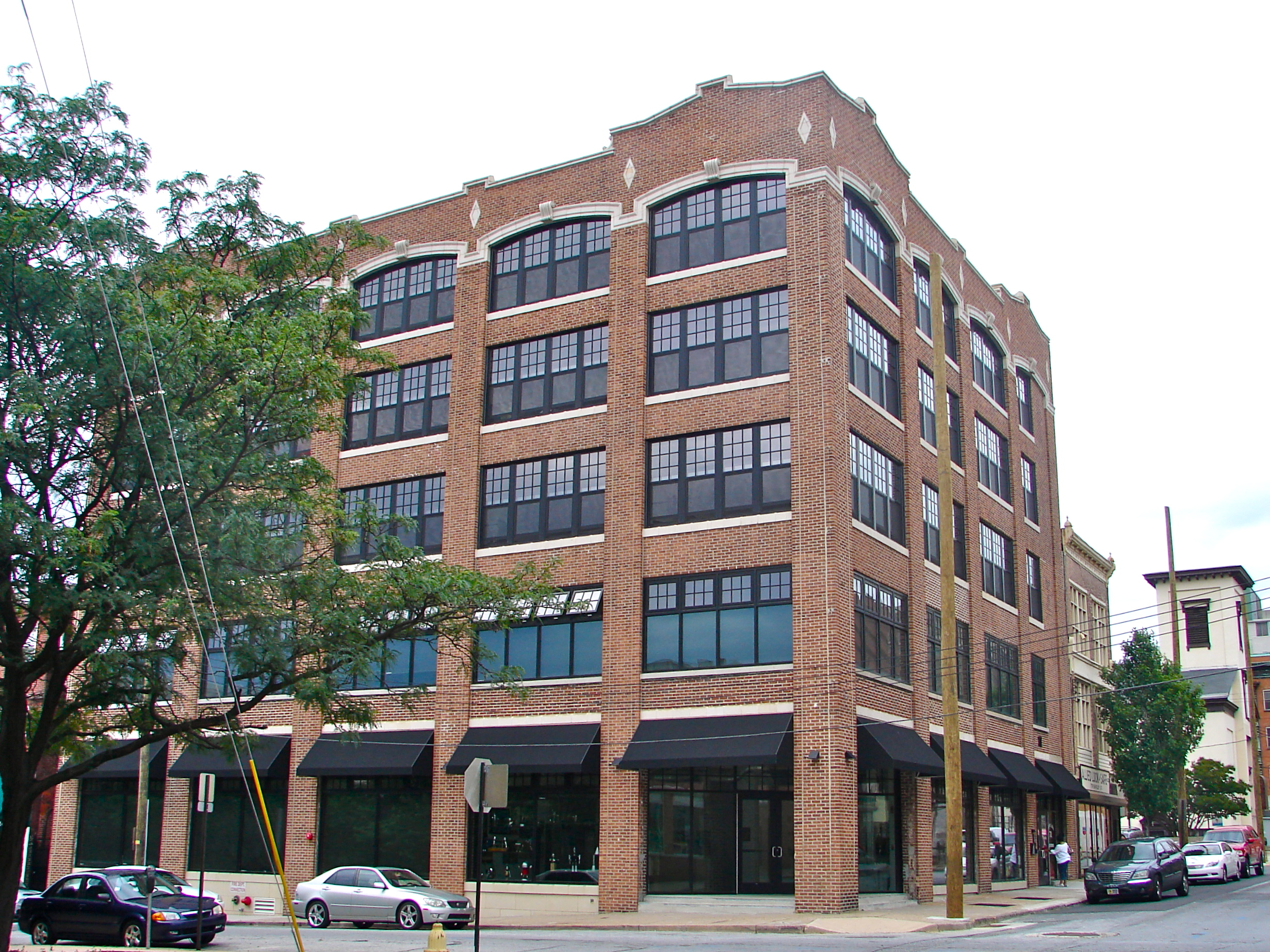
- Foord & Massey Furniture Company Building, June 2011

- Location within Delaware Location within the United States
- Location: 701 N. Shipley St., Wilmington, Delaware
- Coordinates: 39.743106°N 75.550368°W
- Area: less than one acre
- Built: 1917-1919
- Architect: Kennedy, John J.
- Architectural style: Early Commercial
- Part of: Downtown Wilmington Commercial Historic District (ID10000079)
- NRHP reference No.: 06000145

Significant dates
- Added to NRHP: March 24, 2006
- Designated CP: March 24, 2017

Foord & Massey Furniture Company Building is a historic warehouse and showroom located at Wilmington, New Castle County, Delaware. It was built between 1917 and 1919, and is a five-story, five bay by four bay, brick commercial building. It has Collegiate Gothic Revival elements, one of the few commercial buildings in the immediate area designed in this style.

It was added to the National Register of Historic Places in 2006.
