= Happy Harry's =

Defunct drugstore chain

Happy Harry's Discount Drugs
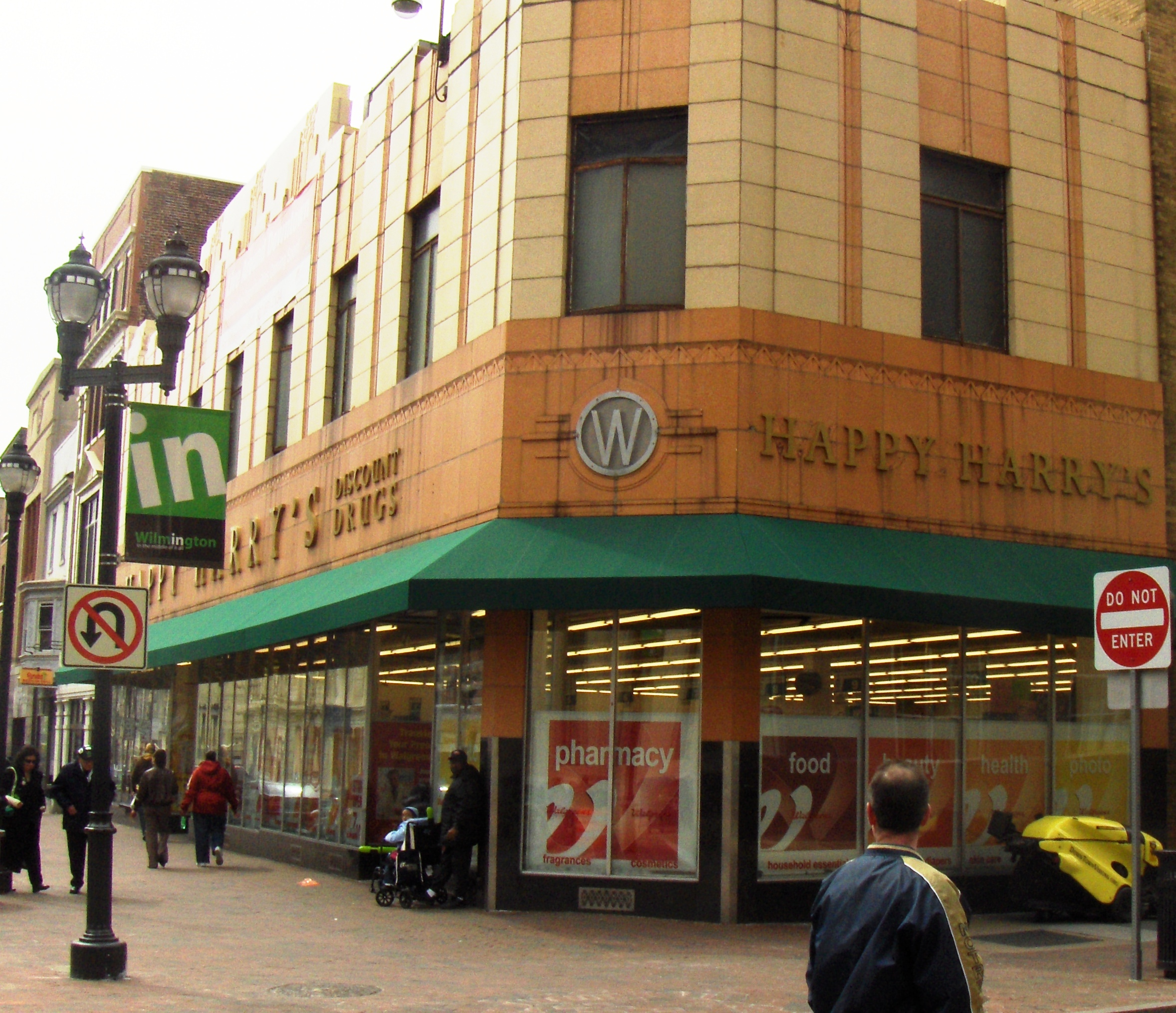
- Happy Harry's on Market Street in Wilmington, Delaware in the old Woolworth's store in 2009
- Formerly: Discount Center (1962–1965)
- Founded: 1962 in Wilmington, Delaware
- Founder: Harry Levin
- Defunct: April 2011
- Fate: Acquisition and conversion to Walgreens
- Successor: Walgreens
- Number of locations: 76 (2006)
- Key people: Alan Levin (president and CEO prior to closure)
- Parent: Walgreens

Happy Harry's was an American drugstore chain that was merged into Walgreens starting in 2006. Happy Harry's operated 76 locations in Delaware, Pennsylvania, Maryland, and New Jersey. Harry Levin, and entrepreneur, started it in 1962.

On June 5, 2006, it was revealed that the chain had agreed to be acquired by Walgreens.

== History ==
In 1962, Harry Levin (1928-1987) opened his first store in Wilmington, Delaware, simply called "Discount Center". He quickly gained a reputation for his always-cheerful disposition, and customers soon simply referred to his store as "Happy's". In 1965, upon opening his third store, the name of the chain was changed to "Happy Harry's Discount Drugs". Just before the company's 25th anniversary in 1987, "Happy Harry" died, and his son, Alan Levin, took over the growing company. At the time, Happy Harry's was the largest drugstore chain in Delaware and soon grew to 76 stores.

=== Acquisition and closure ===
On June 5, 2006, Happy Harry's announced that it would be acquired by Walgreens. Jeffrey Rein, Chief Executive Officer (CEO) and President of Walgreen announced the acquisition in July of 2006. The announcement of the acquisition was surprising for Walgreens, whose approach differs most notably from its competitors when it comes to growth. Walgreens expansion is fueled primarily by opening new, freestanding locations with drive-thru pharmacies and occasionally by quiet acquisitions of small pharmacies, rather than expanding through mergers and public acquisitions. However, with little presence in Happy Harry's primary market, the addition of Happy Harry's was a valuable new resource for Walgreens to leverage in its continuing expansion.

Initially, Walgreens decided to keep Happy Harry's name on its existing stores. However, the eight stores in Pennsylvania were revamped as standard stores due to Walgreens' stronger branding there. Happy Harry's remained open in Delaware but was modified to read "Happy Harry's, a Walgreens Pharmacy." These stores went through significant interior and exterior modifications to conform to Walgreens standards for product display, store arrangement, and pharmacy design. Task forces from various Walgreens districts around the country were mobilized to convert the various store systems to Walgreens equivalents. The most important conversion was for the pharmacy, whose computer system was changed to Walgreens homegrown Intercom Plus pharmacy computer software, along with the installation of satellite equipment, which linked each pharmacy with over 7,000 other Walgreens pharmacies in the continental United States, Hawaii, and Puerto Rico. This enabled Happy Harry's customers to have prescriptions refilled and records retrieved at any Walgreens pharmacy nationwide.

In April 2011, the last Happy Harry's pharmacies in the Wilmington area leaving converted to Walgreens, with no remains of Happy Harry's.
