= Starr (surname) =

Origin
- Meaning: Star
- Region of origin: England

Other names
- Variant forms: Steorra, Stjarna, Sterre, Starre

Starr is a family name, originating from the pre-Modern English word starre or sterre, meaning "star".

== People ==
- Albert Starr (1926–2024), American cardiovascular surgeon and inventor
- Allison Starr (born 1977), American collegiate basketball player and coach
- Antony Starr (born 1975), New Zealand television actor
- Ayra Starr (born 2002), Nigerian singer and songwriter
- Barbara Starr (born 1950), American television news journalist
- Barbara Starr Scott (1939–2020), Cherokee Nation politician
- Bart Starr (1934–2019), American football quarterback and coach
- Beau Starr (1944–2026), American actor
- Belle Starr (1848–1889), American outlaw
- Ben Starr (television producer) (1921–2014), American television producer, creator, writer and playwright
- Blaze Starr (1932–2015), American stripper and burlesque star
- Bob Starr, several people
- Bobbi Starr (born 1983), stage name of an American pornographic actress
- Brenda K. Starr (born 1966), American singer
- Bruce Starr (born 1969), American politician in Oregon
- Candace Lynn Starr (born 1975), American murder victim
- Charles Starr (born 1933), American politician in Oregon
- Charmaine Starr (born 1979), Philippine-born American pornographic actress
- Chauncey Starr (1912–2007), American nuclear physicist
- Chester G. Starr (1914–1999), American historian
- Comfort Starr (1589–1659), English physician
- Cornelius Vander Starr (1892–1968), a founder of the American International Group insurance corporation
- David Starr, several people
- Don Starr (1917–1995), American actor
- Edwin Starr (1942–2003), American soul and R&B singer
- Ernest Starr (1890–1981), Canadian politician
- Freddie Starr (1943–2019), English comedian, impressionist and singer
- Frederick Starr (1858–1933), American anthropologist
- S. Frederick Starr (born 1940), American founder and chairman of the Central Asia-Caucasus Institute
- Fredro Starr, born Fred Scruggs in 1970, American rapper and actor
- G. Gabrielle Starr, president of Pomona College
- Garrison Starr (born 1975), American singer-songwriter
- George Reginald Starr (1904–1980), British organiser of a resistance network in France during World War II
- Georgina Starr (born 1968), English artist
- Harry W. Starr (1879–1934), American politician
- Henry Starr (1873–1921), American outlaw
- H. James Starr (1931–2008), American politician
- Irving Starr (1905–1982), American film producer
- Isaac Starr (1895–1989), American physician
- Jack Starr, several people
  - Jack Starr (Texas guitarist), American musician
  - Jack Starr, American metal and blues guitarist and songwriter
- James Starr, several people
  - James Harper Starr (1809–1890), Surgeon General and Secretary of the Treasury of the Republic of Texas
  - James Starr (philatelist) (1870–1948), American philatelist
- Jason Starr (born 1966), American author and screenplay writer
- Joeystarr (born 1967), French rapper of Martinican origin
- John Starr, several people
  - John Howard Starr (1898–1989), American hockey coach
  - John Renshaw Starr (1908–1996), British artist and soldier in World War II
  - John Robert Starr (1927–2000), American journalist and newspaper columnist
- Katarzyna Starr (born 1982), Polish and English chess master
- Kay Starr, stage name of Katherine Starks (1922–2016), American jazz and popular music singer
- Keith Starr (born 1954), American professional basketball player for the Chicago Bulls
- Ken Starr (1946–2022), American judge
- Kenn Starr, American rapper
- Kenny Starr (born 1952), American country singer
- Kenneth I. Starr (born 1943/1944), American former certified public accountant and disbarred attorney
- Kevin Starr (1940–2017), historian and author, State Librarian of California
- Kimberley Starr (born 1970), Australian author
- Kinnie Starr (born 1970), Canadian singer-songwriter
- Lee Anna Starr (1853–1937), American minister, writer, suffragist
- Leonard Starr (1925–2015), American cartoonist
- Lucille Starr (1938–2020), Canadian singer, songwriter, and yodeler
- Lucky Starr (singer) (born 1940), Australian singer
- Manya Starr (1921–2000), American writer
- Mark Starr (1962–2013), English professional wrestler
- Mark Starr (labor educationalist) (1894–1985), British American historian and pedagogue
- Martin Starr (born 1982), American television and film actor
- Maurice Starr (born 1953), American musician, songwriter, and record producer
- Michael/Mike Starr, several people
  - Michael Starr (politician) (1910–2000), Canadian politician
  - Michael Starr (singer) (born 1965), American singer, songwriter and musician
  - Mike Starr (actor) (born 1950), American actor
  - Mike Starr (musician) (1966–2011), American bassist in the band Alice in Chains
- Mortimer P. Starr (1917–1989), American microbiologist
- Nava Starr (born 1949), Canadian female chess player
- Natasha Starr, Polish model
- Natalia Starr, Polish model
- Oliver Starr (1883–1961), American judge
- Patti Starr (1941–2024), Canadian businesswoman
- Paul Starr (born 1949), professor of sociology and public affairs
- Pearl Starr (1868–1925), American prostitute, bordello owner and businesswoman
- Phil Starr (1932–2005), cabaret comedian and singer in England
- Rachel Starr, American pornographic actress
- Richard Starr, several people
- Ringo Starr (born 1940), English musician, drummer for The Beatles
- Ron Starr (1951–2017), American professional wrestler
- Ruby Starr (1949–1995), American singer
- Ryan Starr (born 1982), American Idol contestant
- Sable Starr (1957–2009), American rock and roll groupie
- Sally Starr, several people
- Samuel H. Starr (1810–1891), American cavalry commander
- Stephen Starr, Philadelphia restaurateur
- Steven Starr (born 1957), American filmmaker and media activist
- Stevie Starr (born 1962), Scottish performance artist
- Susan Starr, American pianist
- Tom Starr (c. 1813–1890), American outlaw
- Terrell Starr (1925–2009), American politician
- Tyler Starr (born 1991), American football linebacker
- Walter A. Starr, Jr. (1903–1933), American lawyer and mountain climber
- William Starr, several people

== Fictional characters ==
- Brenda Starr, heroine of the Brenda Starr, Reporter comic strip and its film adaptations
- Clive Starr, on the soap opera Family Affairs
- Daniel Starr, nicknamed Dear Daniel, a cat and Hello Kitty's boyfriend in the Sanrio universe
- David "Lucky" Starr, hero of the Lucky Starr series of science fiction books by Isaac Asimov
- Dudley Starr, on the soap opera Family Affairs
- Elihas Starr or Egghead, a Marvel Comics character
- Ava Starr or Ghost, a Marvel Cinematic Universe character
- Herr Starr, from the comic book Preacher
- Karen Starr or Power Girl, a DC Comics superheroine
- Lone Starr, in the film Spaceballs
- Poppy Starr, on the Nickelodeon comedy Lego City Adventures

== See also ==
- Justice Starr (disambiguation)
- Star (name), given name and surname
- Patrick Starrr (born 1989), American make-up artist
