= Starr =

Starr may refer to:

== People and fictional characters ==
- Starr (surname), a list of people and fictional characters
- Starr (given name), a list of people and fictional characters

== Places ==
=== United States ===
- Starr, Ohio, an unincorporated community
- Starr, South Carolina, a town
- Starr County, Texas
- Starr Township, Cloud County, Kansas
- Starr Township, Hocking County, Ohio
- Starr Historic District, Richmond, Indiana
- Mount Starr, a mountain in California

=== Antarctica ===
- Starr Peninsula, Ellsworth Land
- Starr Lake (McMurdo Station), Ross Island
- Starr Nunatak, Victoria Land

=== Elsewhere ===
- Starr Gate, a location in Blackpool, Lancashire, England
- 4150 Starr, a minor planet

== Buildings ==
- Starr House (disambiguation), various houses on the United States National Register of Historic Places
- Starr Mill, Middletown, Connecticut, on the National Register of Historic Places
- Starr Arena, a sports facility in Hamilton, New York, United States

== Ships ==
- HMS Starr, various Royal Navy ships
- George E. Starr, as steamboat of the Puget Sound Mosquito Fleet
- USS Starr (AKA-67), an attack cargo ship

== Firearms ==
- Starr M1816 Musket, a muzzle-loading contract of Springfield Model
- Starr carbine, a single-shot United States Army rifle
- Starr revolver, a 19th-century double-action revolver designed by E. T. Starr

== Organizations and companies ==
- Starr Foundation, providing grants in education and healthcare
- Starr Companies, an insurance company
- Starr Records, a defunct American record label
- STARR Restaurants, an American restaurant company
- Starr Labs, a musical equipment manufacturer

== Other uses ==
- Starr (law) or starra, an old term for the contract or obligation of a Jew
- Stapled trans-anal rectal resection (STARR), a surgical procedure

== See also ==
- Starr Report, a government report that led to the impeachment of President Bill Clinton in the Lewinsky scandal
- Star (disambiguation)
