= Ollerton (disambiguation) =

Ollerton is a town in the English county of Nottinghamshire.

- New Ollerton is contiguous

Additionally Ollerton can refer to the settlements of:

- Ollerton, Cheshire
- Ollerton, Shropshire
