= Jason Sutton (entertainer) =

American drag artist (1968–2024)

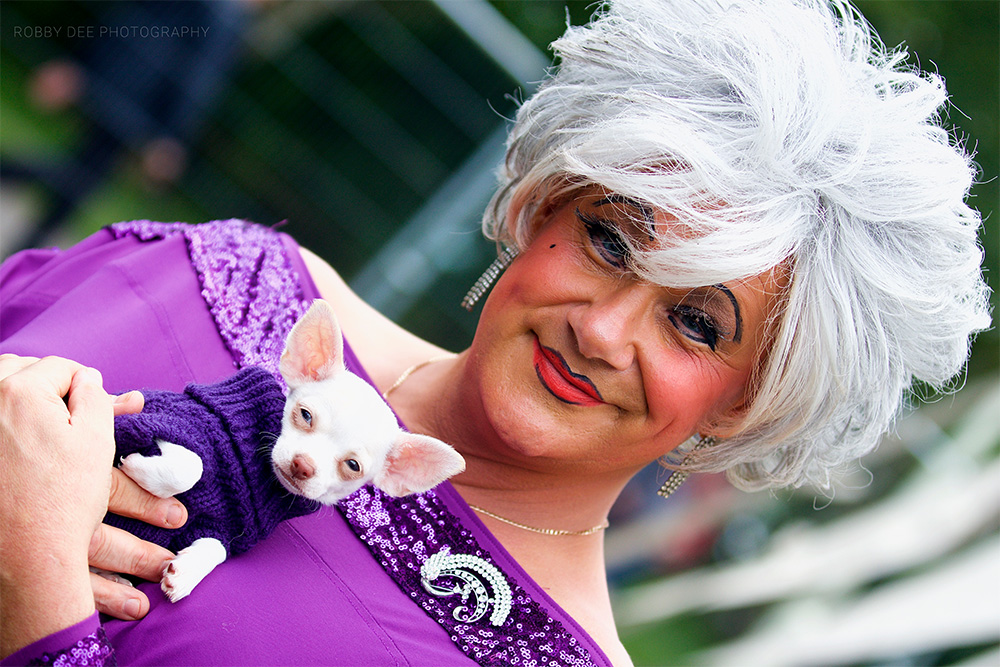
- Miss Jason with dog Chester.
- Born: 27 February 1968; Portsmouth, Hampshire, England
- Died: 22 April 2024 (aged 56); Rottingdean, East Sussex, England
- Other name: Miss Jason
- Occupation: Drag artist

Jason Frederick Sutton (27 February 1968 – 22 April 2024), also known under his stage name as Miss Jason, was an English actor, comedian, drag artist, pantomime dame, and a community and philanthropic activist.

== Career ==
Born 27 February 1968, Jason Sutton began performing in drag at The Old Vic in Portsmouth in August 1996. His drag persona was inspired by gay cabaret comedian and singer Phil Starr. Starr bestowed the stage name "Miss Jason" on Sutton.

Drag artist Stephen Richards, who performs under the name Lola Lasagne, told BBC Radio Sussex that, personality wise, "Miss Jason" was very much like Sutton himself.

Sutton often performed at the Two Brewers pub in London, but was a resident of the village of Rottingdean near the city of Brighton. He was a long-time performer in the Sunday cabaret at the bar at the Legends Hotel. He was named the best local entertainer in Brighton in 2016.

As Miss Jason, Sutton appeared on several television programmes, including the comedy game show Blankety Blank, the reality cooking game show Come Dine With Me, the antiquing game show Put Your Money Where Your Mouth Is, and Weakest Link.

Sutton's performances included pantomime at Portsmouth (2016), Bromley (2017), High Wycombe (2018), Richmond (2019), Barnstaple (2021), Stafford (2022), and Brighton (2023).

== Activism ==
Sutton frequently donated his time and raised funds for LGBTQ causes and for local organizations. Among the more notable recipients were Albert Kennedy Trust, Brighton Rainbow Fund (a fundraising aggregator for the Brighton and Hove LGBTQ community), The Ledward Centre (an LGBTQ community centre and meeting space), The Sussex Beacon (a charity specialising in care and support for people living with HIV), and released a single (Hold On To Your Dream)by Tony Power, to fundraise for the Terrence Higgins Trust.

In July 2015, there was a suspicious package left near the start of the Brighton Pride parade which led to a bomb scare. Sutton, who was hosting a pre-parade breakfast at the Brighton Hotel, helped keep the crowd calm while police investigated the package. Sutton then assisted police in evacuating the crowd in an orderly fashion. In February 2016, Sussex Police Chief Superintendent Nev Kemp presented Sutton with a community award acknowledging the help he gave to law enforcement that day. In part, the citation read: Miss Jason displayed great professionalism and helped to ensure a calm and organised evacuation putting the safety of the local community first."

== Illness and death ==
In the summer of 2020, Sutton began suffering from issues with his balance and from tinnitus. Physicians discovered he had a tumour adjacent to his ear. The treatment left Sutton deaf in his left ear, and the tinnitus affected his ability to listen and concentrate. An online fundraiser netted £5,678 for hearing aids to help in recovery.

Sutton died after a short illness on 22 April 2024, at the age of 56. He was survived by his partner of 33 years, Terry Ward.

G Scene Magazine eulogised him as "a giant of our community" and the Brighton Pride organisation called Sutton "An unsung hero of the community..." Daniel Sexton of BBC Radio Sussex called him a "phenomenal" pantomime player.

== See also ==
- LGBT culture in Brighton and Hove
