= St Giles' Church, Ollerton =

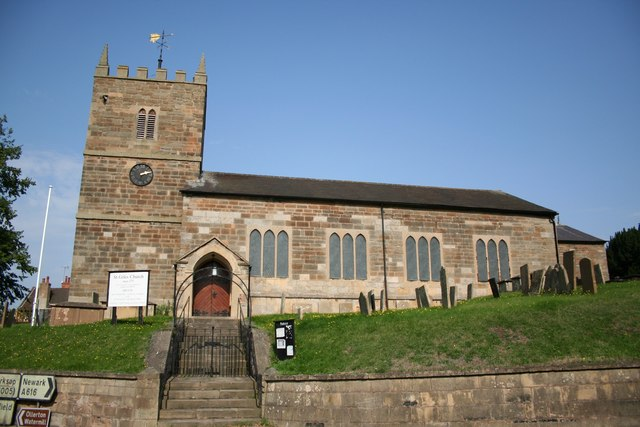
- St Giles' Church, Ollerton
- St Giles' Church, Ollerton
- 53°11′55.56″N 1°1′20.84″W
- OS grid reference: SK 65389 67356
- Location: Ollerton
- Country: England
- Denomination: Church of England

History
- Dedication: St Giles

Architecture
- Heritage designation: Grade II listed

Administration
- Diocese: Southwell and Nottingham
- Archdeaconry: Newark
- Deanery: Newark and Southwell
- Parish: Ollerton with Boughton

St Giles’ Church, Ollerton is a Grade II listed parish church in the Church of England in Ollerton, Nottinghamshire, England.

== History ==
The church dates from around 1790. A new clock was fixed in the tower in 1875. It included Cambridge quarter chimes and was built by the company Thwaites & Reed.

== Parish status ==
The church is in a joint parish with

- St Matthew's Church, Boughton
- St Paulinus' Church, New Ollerton

== See also ==
- Listed buildings in Ollerton and Boughton
