= Ollerton and Boughton =

Civil parish of Nottinghamshire, England

Coordinates: 53.2058°N 1.0078°W

- Civil parish
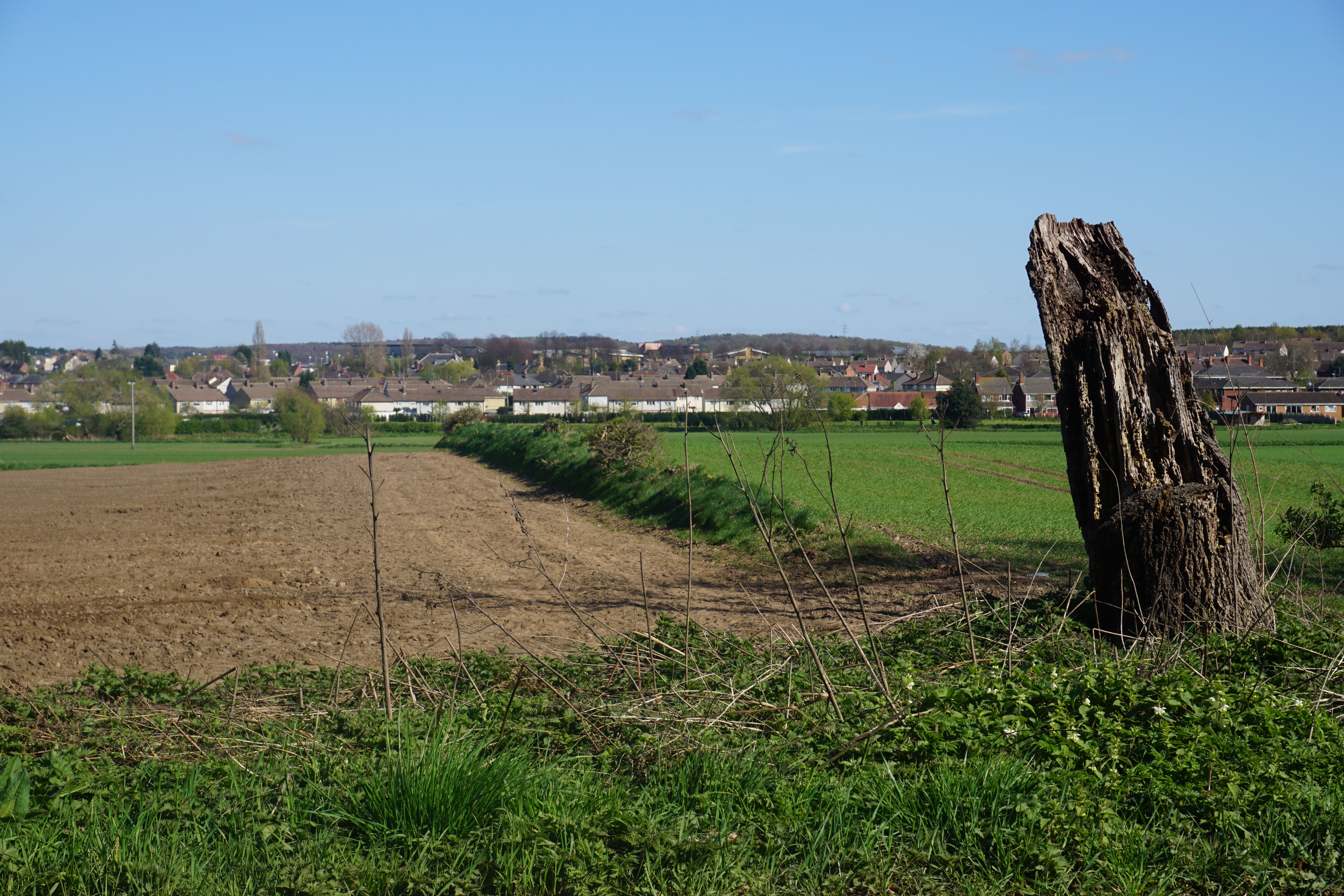
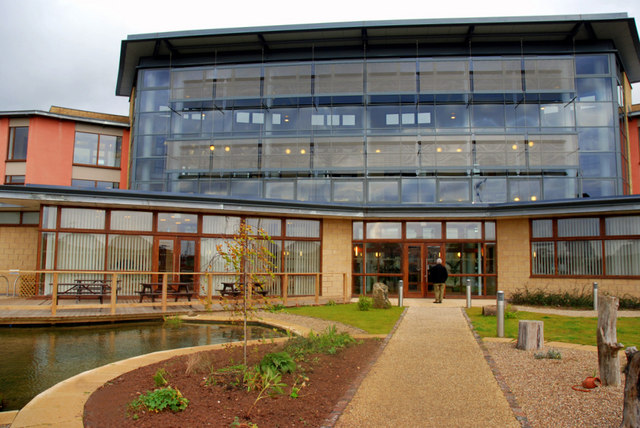
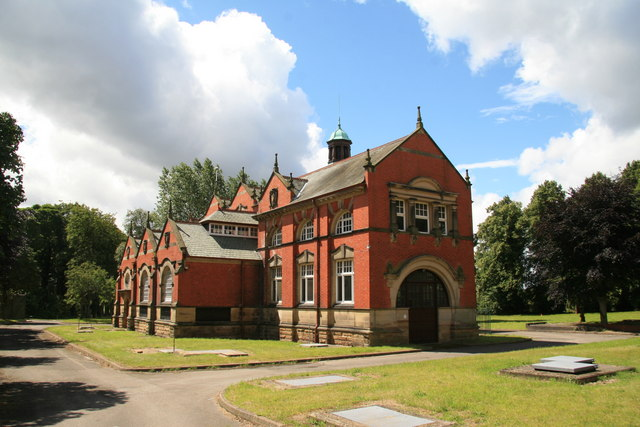
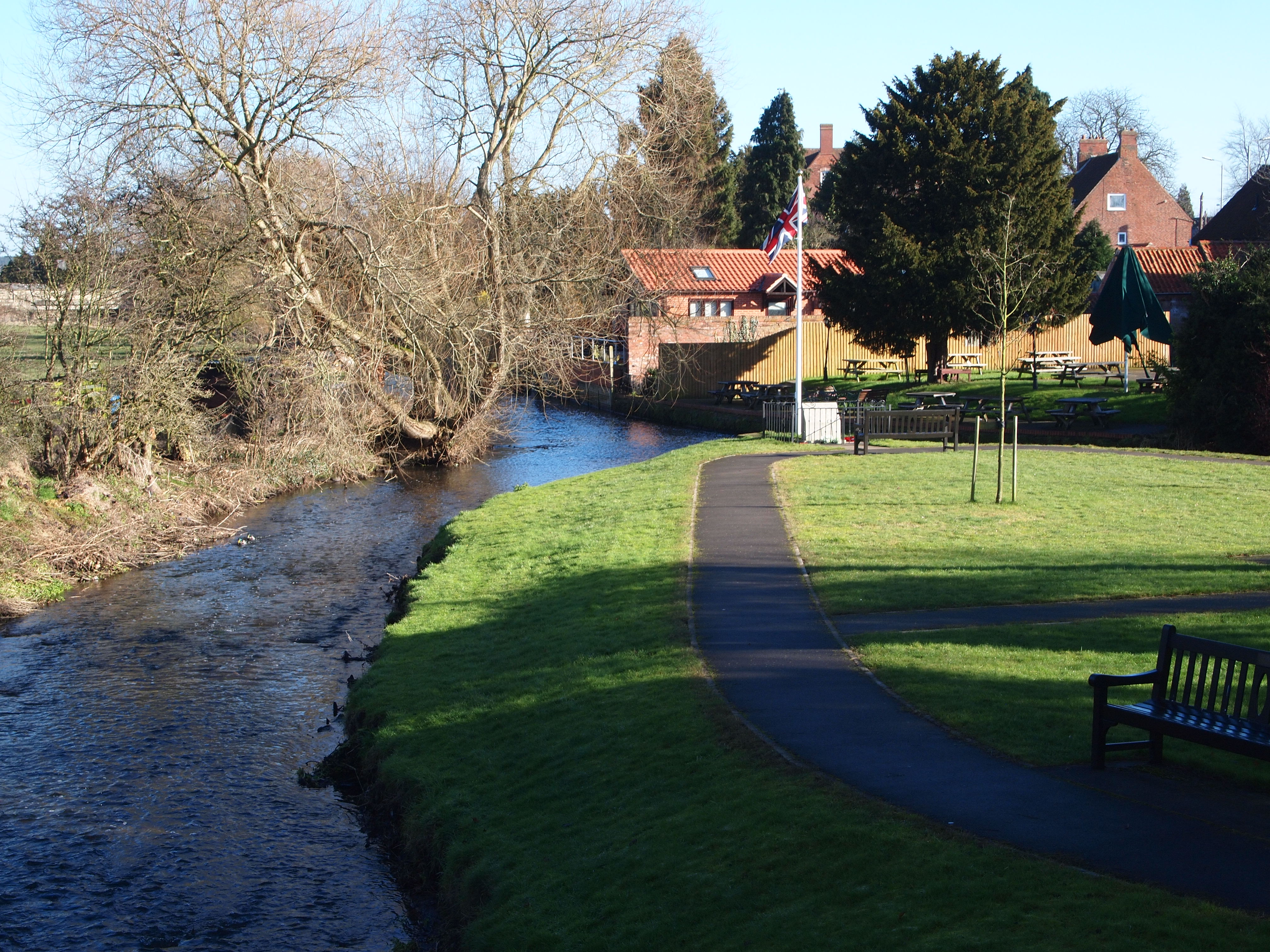
- New Ollerton from afar Sherwood Energy Village Boughton Pumping Station Ollerton Village

- Location within Nottinghamshire
- Interactive map of Ollerton and Boughton
- Area: 4.78 sq mi (12.4 km^{2})
- Population: 11,089 (2021)
  - Density: 2,320/sq mi (900/km^{2})
- Created: 1996
- OS grid reference: SK 664679
  - London: 120 mi (190 km) SSE
- District: Newark and Sherwood
- Shire county: Nottinghamshire
- Region: East Midlands
- Country: England
- Sovereign state: United Kingdom
- Places: Ollerton; Boughton; New Ollerton
- Post town: NEWARK
- Postcode district: NG22
- Dialling code: 01623 / 01636
- Police: Nottinghamshire
- Fire: Nottinghamshire
- Ambulance: East Midlands
- UK Parliament: Sherwood
- Website: https://ollerton-tc.gov.uk

Ollerton and Boughton is a civil parish in the Newark and Sherwood district of Nottinghamshire, England. The main settlements are the village of Ollerton and the town of New Ollerton and Boughton. The civil parish was formed in 1996, when the civil parishes of Ollerton and Boughton were merged. The population of the civil parish at the time of the 2011 census was recorded as 9,840, and this increased to 11,089 residents at the 2021 census.

== New Ollerton ==
The history of the building of New Ollerton can be traced between 1922 and 1932 built by the Butterley Company between Ollerton Hall and the New Plough Public House and cemetery.

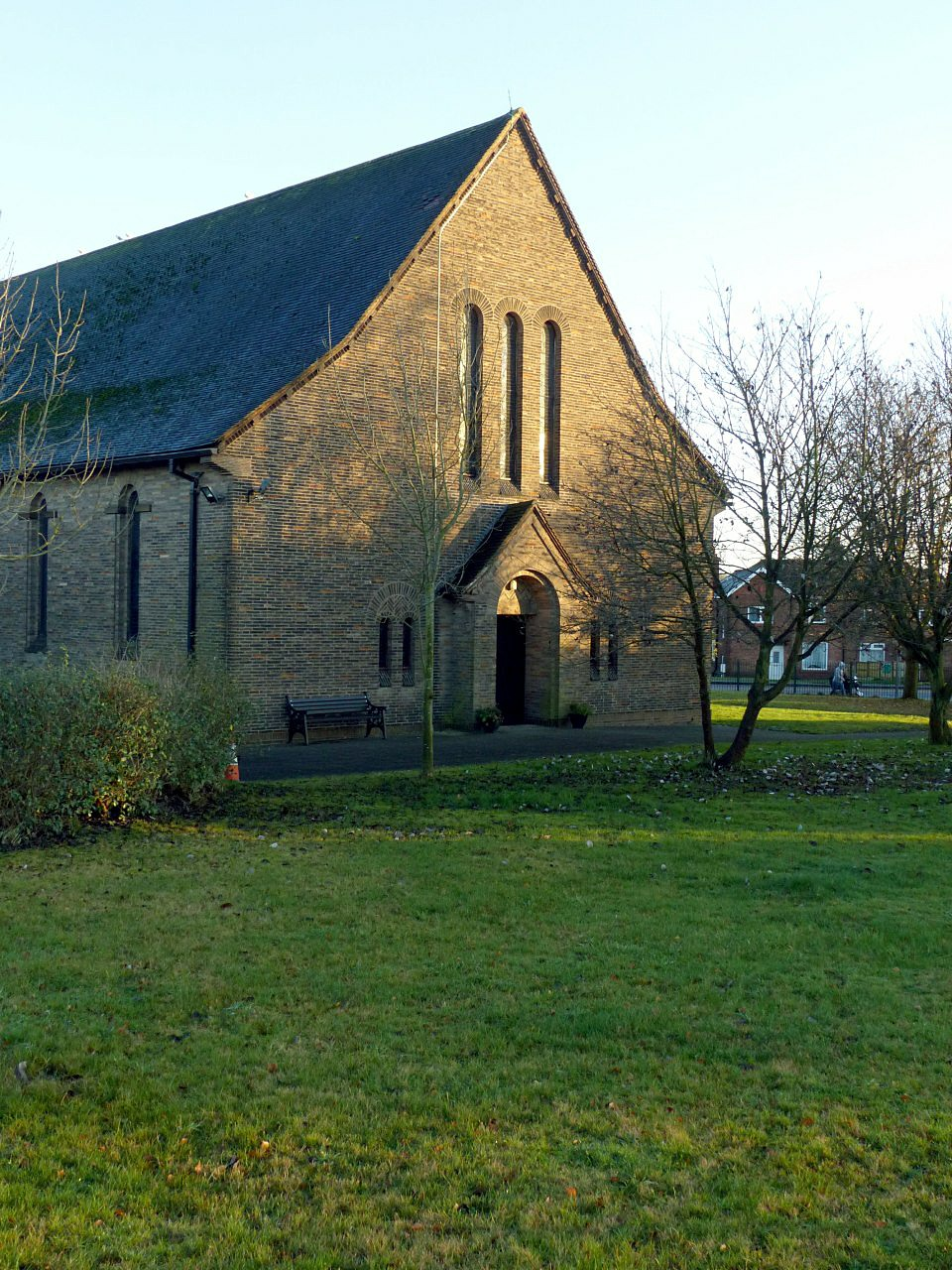
St Paulinus Church, New Ollerton

New Ollerton was greatly expanded towards the small hamlet of Boughton as Ollerton became a colliery village in the mid-1920s. New Ollerton was once acclaimed in the Spectator magazine as 'an admirable industrial housing scheme' – also known as a 'model village'. Miners enjoyed a high standard of living, with semi-detached houses, large gardens and hot water supplied directly from Ollerton Colliery.

== Boughton ==
Boughton (pronounced 'Booton') is recorded in the Domesday Book and has had a varied history: it has played host to Viking invaders and Italian and German prisoners of war, and at one stage formed part of the vast Rufford Estate.

Originally a small hamlet centred on St Matthew's Church, farming was the main occupation until the 1930s, when the face of Boughton began to change dramatically. The sinking of Ollerton Colliery and the housing stock that followed means that today the boundary between New Ollerton and Boughton can be difficult to recognise. A noted architectural feature of the area is the listed Edwardian Boughton Pumping Station, which formerly supplied over three million gallons of clean water each day to homes in the city of Nottingham.

== Ollerton Village ==
Ollerton, originally known as Alreton or Allerton, meaning 'farm among the alders', is situated at the crossroads of the York to London, Worksop to Newark, and Lincoln to Mansfield roads. Due to its location, in medieval times Ollerton became a meeting place for forest officials, commissioners and Justices of the Peace, leading to the development of its two coaching inns, The White Hart and The Hop Pole. For many years, the main occupation in Ollerton was hop growing – there were hop fields along the River Maun from as early as 1691 and a weekly hop market was held in the town on Fridays.

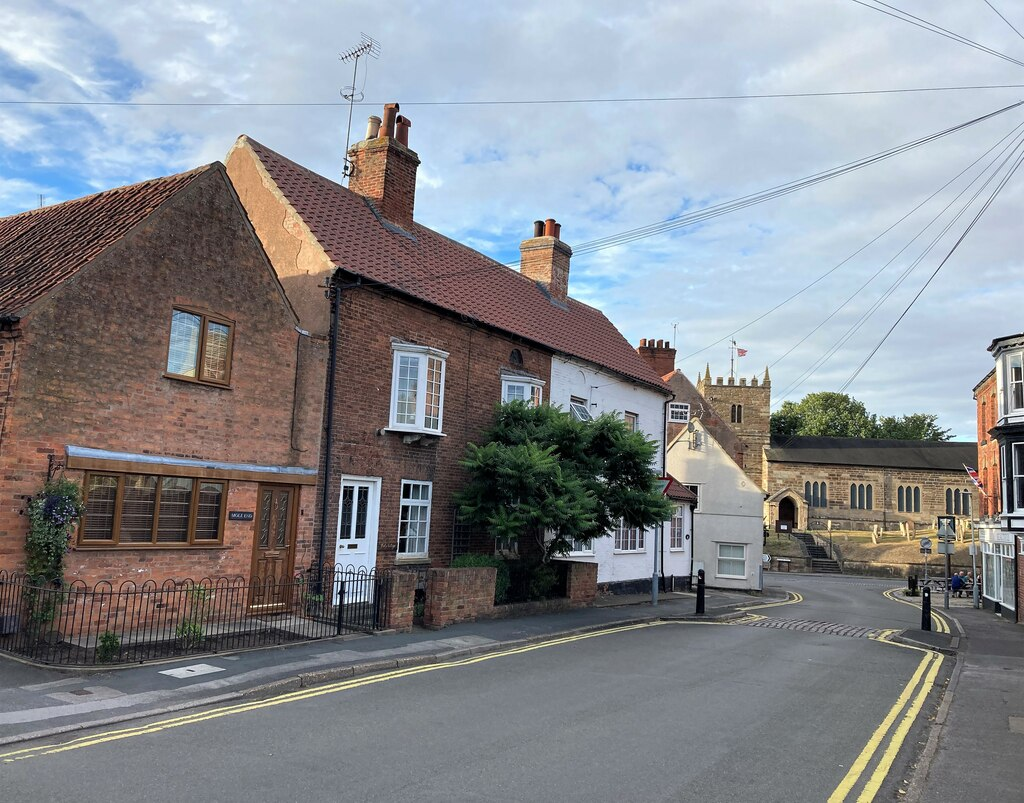
Ollerton Village

The Markhams, a land owning family, were highly influential in the town's development. They built and lived in Ollerton Hall and the story of their life during the Civil War is immortalised in a book by Elizabeth Glaister.

Throughout the centuries, watermills have played an important part of life in Ollerton; today the only working watermill in Nottinghamshire can be found in the village, built in 1713 on the same spot as one of those listed in the Domesday Book.

== Amenities ==
There is a small high street in New Ollerton with shops including a post office, chemist, and grocery stores. There is also a shopping area on Sherwood Drive which includes charity shops and an indoor market. This is also the home of the Town Hall and Lifespring Centre, a local charitable community venue and cafe. There are local churches including Lifespring Church, St Paulinus and the Methodist Church which also acts as the local food bank.

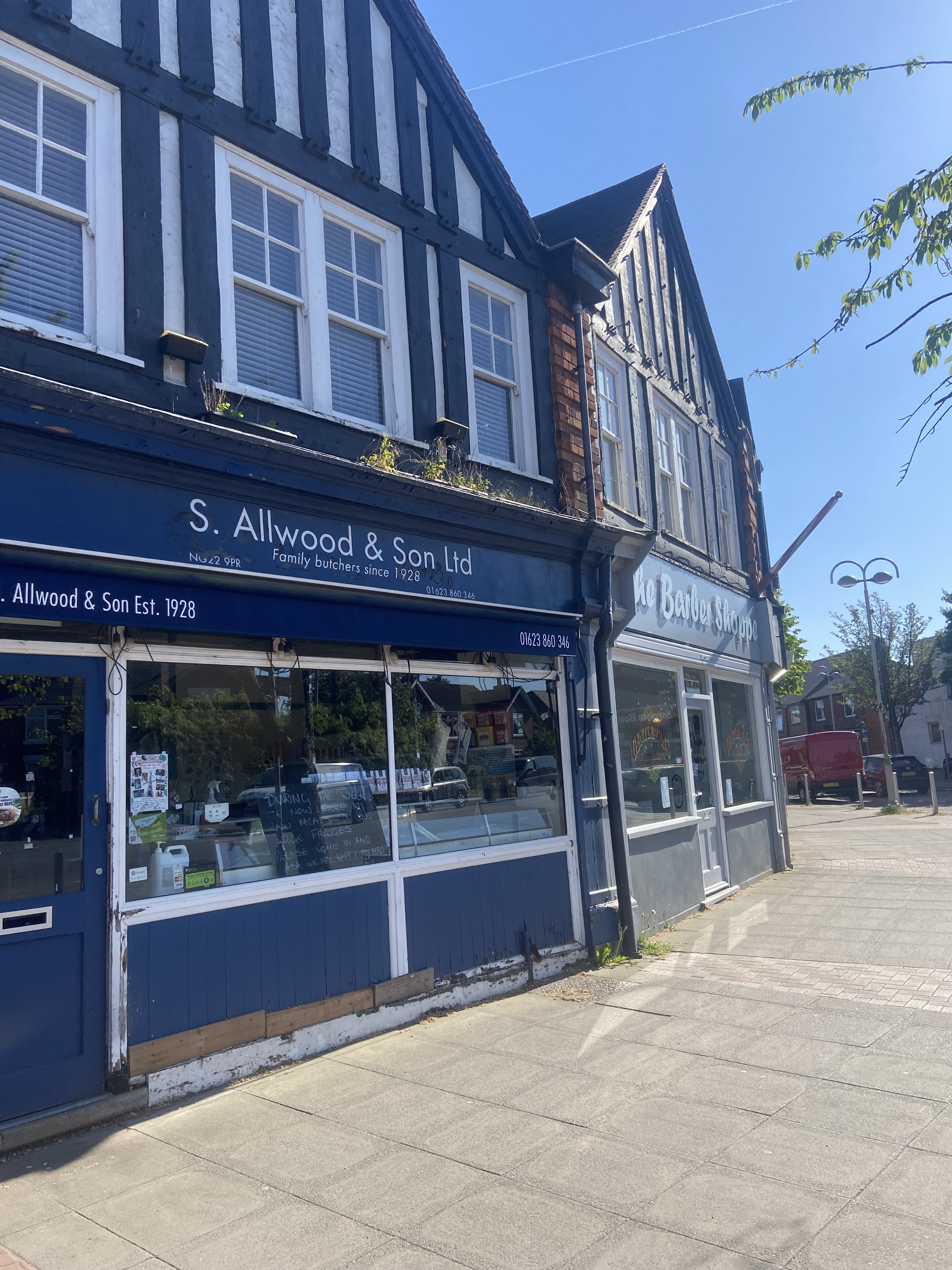
Forest Road, New Ollerton

There is an Army Cadet Force and a community band. The town has two supermarkets.

== History ==
=== The Industrial Revolution and events ===
From the 1920s onwards the main industry was coal mining with Ollerton expanding greatly during the 1960s and 1970s, having the name New Ollerton.

The colliery was sunk in the 1920s and completed during the General Strike of 1926, which led to a saying of "Ollerton was ever built with scab labour".

The coal mine was established and funded by the Butterley Company, having an historic base of coal and iron ore mining in nearby Derbyshire; they created a model village in Ollerton for the colliery higher management and workers. A hosiery factory was established in 1937 to provide work for the miners' wives.

During the expansion of the pit, many miners from closed collieries in north-eastern England and Scotland moved to work at Ollerton. There was a large Polish community amongst the miners at Ollerton, estimated to make up roughly half the workforce at the time of the 1984-1985 strike.

Ollerton Colliery was considered one of the most left-wing pits in Nottinghamshire, and was subject to heavy picketing at the time of the ballot by the Nottinghamshire branch of the National Union of Mineworkers in March 1984. A miner from Ackton Hall Colliery, near Featherstone, West Yorkshire died at Ollerton when picketing during the miners' strike on 15 April 1984. David Gareth Jones was hit in the neck by a brick thrown by a local youth when he was picketing, but the post-mortem ruled that it had not caused his death and that it was more likely to have been caused by being pressed against the pit gates earlier in the day. News of his death led to hundreds of pickets staying in Ollerton town centre overnight. At the request of Nottinghamshire Police, Arthur Scargill appeared and called for calm in the wake of the tragedy. However, several working miners in Ollerton reported that their gardens and cars had been vandalised during the night. A memorial bench was sited near the spot where David died. As a mark of respect for Jones, Ollerton Colliery closed for a few days afterwards.

== Regeneration ==
Ollerton Hall which came into disrepair is now being renovated. Ollerton Hall was purchased by Newark and Sherwood District Council for renovation. The hall will now become 8 apartments.

The Ollerton regeneration project 2023 plans to transform New Ollerton which aims to deliver a state-of-the-art library, boutique cinema and residential, retail and hospitality spaces from the levelling up funds from the UK Government. The plans have been put into place by Newark and Sherwood District Council.

=== The history of regeneration ===
The mine closed in 1994, losing around 1,000 jobs. A group of locals including past colliery workers had a vision to try to establish a new facility that would – at least – provide as many new jobs as were lost. A non-profit organisation run by 10 trustees was established to raise "...just under £50,000" to purchase the 125-acre colliery footprint from British Coal.

A further £4.25 million was needed to reclaim and clean up the land, which was redeveloped as an ecologically sustainable business park of commercial offices occupying 40-acres, named Sherwood Energy Village.

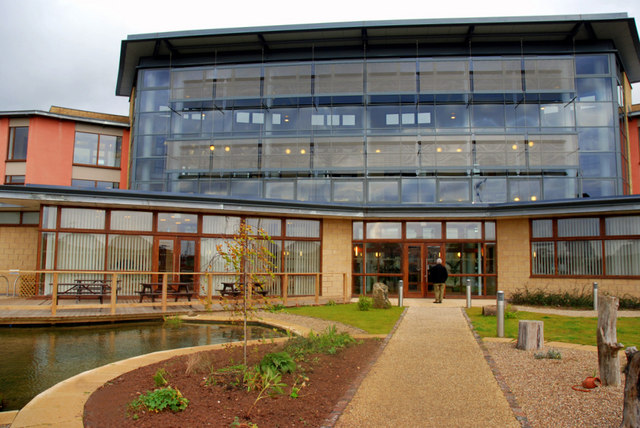
Sherwood Energy Village headquarters in 2006

Key-tenants, including Center Parcs and Nottinghamshire County Council, were responsible for creating their own buildings, with an emphasis on low-energy consumption by using advanced materials and technology including ground source heat pumps. Included into the layout was a nearby Tesco superstore.

The original development organisation failed in 2010 and went into administration, citing difficult trading conditions after the worldwide 2008 financial crisis, having created 500 more jobs than the original 1,000 target, and having been awarded the inaugural Enterprising Britain Award in 2005.

== See also ==
- Listed buildings in Ollerton and Boughton
- Walesby
