= Listed buildings in Ollerton and Boughton =

Ollerton and Boughton is a civil parish in the Newark and Sherwood district of Nottinghamshire, England. The parish contains 22 listed buildings that are recorded in the National Heritage List for England. Of these, one is listed at Grade II*, the middle of the three grades, and the others are at Grade II, the lowest grade. The parish contains the town of Ollerton, the villages of New Ollerton and Boughton, and the surrounding countryside. In the parish is Boughton Pumping Station, and three buildings associated with it are listed. The other listed buildings include houses, cottages and associated structures, three churches and associated structures, a church hall, a hotel and a public house, a former watermill, a bridge, a war memorial and a public house.

== Key ==
Grade	Criteria
II*	Particularly important buildings of more than special interest
II	Buildings of national importance and special interest

== Buildings ==
Name and location	Photograph	Date	Notes	Grade
Ollerton Hall; 53.20098°N 1.02136°W		c. 1700	A country house in brick on a moulded stone plinth, with stone dressings, floor bands, dentilled eaves, and a hipped tile roof. There are two storeys and attics, and an H-shaped plan, with a main range of seven bays, and projecting gabled wings each with two bays. The middle three bays on the north front project and are flanked by pilasters. In the centre is a doorway with a panelled eared architrave, and a segmental pediment on curved brackets. The windows are sashes with moulded panelled architraves, and there are flat-roofed dormers.	II*
Former Forest House Hotel; 53.20016°N 1.02259°W		Early 18th century	The former hotel is in brick, the ground floor rendered and colourwashed, on a plinth, with stone dressings, quoins, a floor band, rebated eaves, and a hipped tile roof. There are two storeys and an L-shaped plan, with fronts of five bays. One of the doorways has a fanlight, and the windows are sashes, those in the upper floor with rubbed brick heads and keystones.	II
Old Post Office; 53.19927°N 1.02315°W		Early 18th century	The post office, later a shop, is in brick with a floor band and a pantile roof. There are two storeys and attics, and four bays. The left two bays contain a 19th-century shop front with pilasters, a dentilled cornice, a central doorway with a round head and a blind fanlight, and flanking windows with elliptical heads and fanlights. The other windows are sashes with rubbed brick heads.	II
Hop Pole Hotel, stable block and outbuilding 53.19983°N 1.02271°W		c. 1740	The hotel and adjoining buildings are in brick with tile roofs. The hotel has a floor band and dentilled eaves. The main block has three storeys and an attic, and five bays, the middle three bays projecting under a dentilled pediment containing a half-round window with imposts and a keystone. In the centre is a round-headed doorway with pilasters, a fanlight and an open pediment. The windows are sashes with splayed lintels. The main block is flanked by two-storey wings, with four bays on the left and three on the right. To the left is a stable block with two storeys and five bays. It contains a central carriage entry with a segmental head, flanked by recessed bays with segmental heads containing casement windows, and in the upper floor are sash windows. The outbuilding on the right has two storeys, a single bay, and a coped gable.	II
Ollerton Watermill and Mill House; 53.19963°N 1.02358°W		Mid 18th century	The former watermill and mill house are in brick with dentilled eaves and tile roofs. The mill has two storeys and an attic, and three bays, the middle bay projecting and containing a doorway. The windows have segmental heads. At the rear is a gabled wing, a wheel opening with a segmental head, and a hatch. To the left, the mill house has a single bay, a doorway with pilasters and a fanlight, and sash windows with segmental heads.	II
2 and 3 Church Lane, Boughton; 53.20913°N 0.98496°W	—	Late 18th century	A pair of cottages that were refronted in 1860, they are in buff brick, on a plinth, with rebated eaves, and a pantile roof. There are two storeys and two bays. Each cottage has a doorway, and the windows are casements with chamfered surrounds and four-centred arched heads.	II
4–8 Church Lane, Boughton; 53.20917°N 0.98467°W	—	Late 18th century	A row of five, later four cottages, that were refronted in the 19th century. They are in brick with pantile roofs, two storeys and six bays. The windows are casements, and the ground floor openings have segmental heads. To the right is a later single-storey single-bay extension.	II
Curiosity Cottage (commercially renamed as Blue Bell Cottage) and former shop, Wellow Road; 53.19936°N 1.02326°W	—	Late 18th century	The cottage is in red brick with the former shop having a painted facade; the eaves are dentilled and there are pantiled roofs. There are two storeys and three bays. There are two cottage doorways, and the windows are casements with mullions.	II
White Hart Inn; 53.19894°N 1.02285°W		Late 18th century	The public house is in brick with a pantile roof. There are three storeys and an L-shaped plan, with a front range of six bays, and a rear wing with two storeys and three bays. On the front are two doorways with hoods on curved brackets, and sash windows with segmental heads, and the windows in the rear wing are casements.	II
St Giles' Church, Ollerton; 53.19929°N 1.02263°W		c. 1780	The church is in stone and brick, partly rendered, with roofs of tile and slate. It consists of a nave and a chancel under a continuous roof, a south porch, a vestry and store, and a west tower. The tower has three stages, a chamfered plinth, two string courses, a north doorway, clock faces, two-light bell openings, an embattled parapet with four crocketed pinnacles, and a wind vane.	II
Boundary wall, Ollerton Hall; 53.20113°N 1.02071°W	—	Early 19th century	The boundary wall of the hall is in brick with stone caps, and has coping in ramped brick and stone. It contains square piers with pyramidal caps, doorways, and a portion of a dwarf wall with a paling fence.	II
Whitewater Bridge; 53.22515°N 1.00863°W		c, 1837	The bridge carries Whitewater Lane over the River Maun. It is in brick with stone dressings, and consists of three semicircular arches, the middle arch larger. The bridge has a chamfered string course, a coped parapet, and four square brick piers with square domed caps. On the parapets are inscribed iron plaques.	II
Church Hall; 53.20936°N 0.98496°W		1859	Originally a school, it is in red and yellow brick on a rendered plinth, with moulded dentilled eaves, and a slate roof with shaped bargeboards and finials. There are five unequal bays, the left bay projecting with two storeys under a gable, and the rest with a single storey. In the angle and in the right bay are gabled porches; the right porch is flanked by diamond-shaped recesses, the right one inscribed. The left bay has a pointed recess containing casement windows, the upper one with a pointed head; the other windows are casements with pointed heads.	II
1 Church Lane, Boughton; 53.20913°N 0.98508°W	—	1861	Originally a school house, it is in buff and red brick, with rebated eaves, and a pantile roof. There are two storeys and two bays. In the left bay is a gabled porch with wavy bargeboards, and a pointed doorway with a chamfered surround. The windows are casements with four-centred arched heads. In the gable end is a two-storey pointed recess containing a window with Y-tracery, and at the rear is a doorway with a rubbed brick head.	II
St Matthew's Church, Boughton; 53.20948°N 0.98542°W		1868	The church, designed by James Fowler, is in stone and brick with a slate roof. It consists of a nave, a south porch, a chancel, a vestry and a southwest steeple. The steeple has a tower with two stages, buttresses, a string course, a clock face, two-light bell openings, billeted eaves and a broach spire with two tiers of lucarnes.	II
Boundary wall, St Matthew's Church, Boughton; 53.20895°N 0.98543°W	—	1868	The boundary wall of the churchyard is in stone with chamfered coping. It extends for about 80 metres (260 ft), and contains nine buttresses with chamfered tops, and a pair of square gate piers with moulded gabled tops.	II
Main pump house, boiler house and workshops, Boughton Pumping Station; 53.21601°N 1.00133°W		1905	The pump house, designed by William Beedham Starr, is in red brick with stone dressings, a chamfered plinth, stone bands, a string course, a modillion cornice, a coped parapet, and slate roofs with coped gables. There are three storeys and a basement, and five bays. The entrance front has a double flight of stairs, and a doorway with a fanlight, a modillion lintel and a segmental head with a keystone. Above it is a Diocletian window flanked by cartouches, and a double casement window with balusters and a pediment. The basement has segmental headed windows, and in the outer bays are casement windows with segmental heads and keystones, above which are Diocletian windows. The workshop has a single storey ad five bays, segmental-headed carriage doors and dormers. The boiler house has two storeys, six bays, an arcade with segmental heads, and above are mullioned and transomed casements.	II
Minor pump house, Boughton Pumping Station; 53.21558°N 1.00179°W		1905	The pump house, designed by William Beedham Starr, is in red brick with stone dressings, on a moulded plinth, with sill bands, a modillion cornice, dentilled eaves, and Westmorland slate roofs with coped gables, kneelers and obelisk finials. There are three storeys and an L-shaped plan, with six bays. Most windows are casements and most have keystones. On the south gable are steps with a scrolled balustrade, a parapet and ball finials, leading to a portico with Tuscan columns, a foliate soffit and a semicircular head. On the west side is a projecting filter house with three storeys and three bays, containing casement windows with shaped heads and Diocletian windows. It is surmounted by an octagonal cupola with a copper ogee dome.	II
Boundary wall and gates, Boughton Pumping Station; 53.21530°N 1.00042°W		1905	The boundary wall, which extends for about 150 metres (490 ft), is in red and blue brick on a chamfered plinth, and has stepped moulded stone coping. The wall contains 23 square brick piers with stone caps. The main north gateway has larger piers with domed caps, and incurved walls, and contains a pair of ornamental wrought iron gates. The south gate has similar piers, and outcurved dwarf walls with wrought iron railing.	II
Ollerton War Memorial; 53.20005°N 1.02349°W		1920	The war memorial stands in a triangular garden, it is in Hopton Wood Stone, and about 3.5 metres (11 ft) high. The memorial consists of a cross with a tall tapering shaft, on a trapezoidal plinth, on a square base of three steps. On the front of the shaft is an inscription, and on the plinth are the names of those lost in the two World Wars. There are two further memorials commemorating later losses, a vase and an inscribed tablet.	II
St Paulinus' Church, New Ollerton; 53.20649°N 1.00627°W		1931	The church, which is in Romanesque style, is in brick with dressings in stone and concrete, and has tile and lead roofs. It consists of a nave, aisles and a chancel under a swept roof, north and south porches, a south transept with a half-round bell turret in the gable, and a baptistry. In the chancel are Diocletian windows, the baptistry has a round-headed opening, and elsewhere are narrow round-headed lancet windows.	II
Telephone kiosk 53.19987°N 1.02309°W		1935	The K6 type telephone kiosk opposite the Hop Pole Hotel was designed by Giles Gilbert Scott. Constructed in cast iron with a square plan and a dome, it has three unperforated crowns in the top panels.	II
