= William Starr =

William Starr may refer to:

- William Starr (politician), American businessman, politician and abolitionist
- William Starr (violinist), American violinist
- William Beedham Starr, architect based in Nottingham, England
- Bill Starr, Major League Baseball catcher

== See also ==
- Will Starr, Scottish accordionist
