= Star (name) =

Star is a given name and a surname. Notable people with the name include:

== Surname ==
- Darren Star (born 1961), American producer, director and writer
- Edy Star (1938–2025), Brazilian singer, composer, actor, theatre producer and TV presenter
- Jeffree Star (born 1985), American CEO of Jeffree Star Cosmetics
- Ryan Star (born 1978), American singer-songwriter
- Susan Leigh Star (1954–2010), American sociologist
- Tamaiti Willie Star (1926–2007), Nauruan diplomat and politician

== Given name ==
=== Women ===
- Star Anna (born 1986), American singer
- Star Black, American poet, photographer, and artist
- Star Fire (wrestler) (born 1992), Mexican professional wrestler
- Star Gossage (born 1973), New Zealand painter
- Star Jones (born 1962), American co-host of the television show The View, lawyer, journalist and writer
- Star Montana (born 1987), American photographer
- Star Parker (born 1956), American columnist, Republican politician, author, and conservative political activist
- Star Simpson, American engineer and inventor
- Star St.Germain (born 1982), American game developer
- Star Stowe (1956–1997), American model and Playboy Playmate of the Month

=== Men ===
- Star Black (wrestler) (born 1993), Mexican professional wrestler
- Star Caywood (1915–1968), American politician
- Star Lotulelei (born 1989), National Football League player
- Star Tauasi (born 1975), Niuean boxer
- Star WallowingBull (born 1973), Native American visual artist
- Star Zulu, Zambian boxer

== Fictional characters ==
- Star, a half-vampire from the film The Lost Boys
- Star, recurring character on Danny Phantom
- Patrick Star, a starfish character from the animated television series SpongeBob SquarePants
- Star Butterfly, the main character from the animated television series Star vs the Forces of Evil

== See also ==
- Starr (given name)
- Starr (surname)
