= Judge Starr =

Judge Starr may refer to:

- Brantley Starr (born 1979), judge of the United States District Court for the Northern District of Texas
- Ken Starr (1946–2022), judge of the United States Court of Appeals for the District of Columbia Circuit
- Raymond Wesley Starr (1888–1968), judge of the United States District Court for the Western District of Michigan

== See also ==
- Justice Starr (disambiguation)
