= East Brandywine Historic District =

Historic district in Delaware, United States

- U.S. National Register of Historic Places
- U.S. Historic district
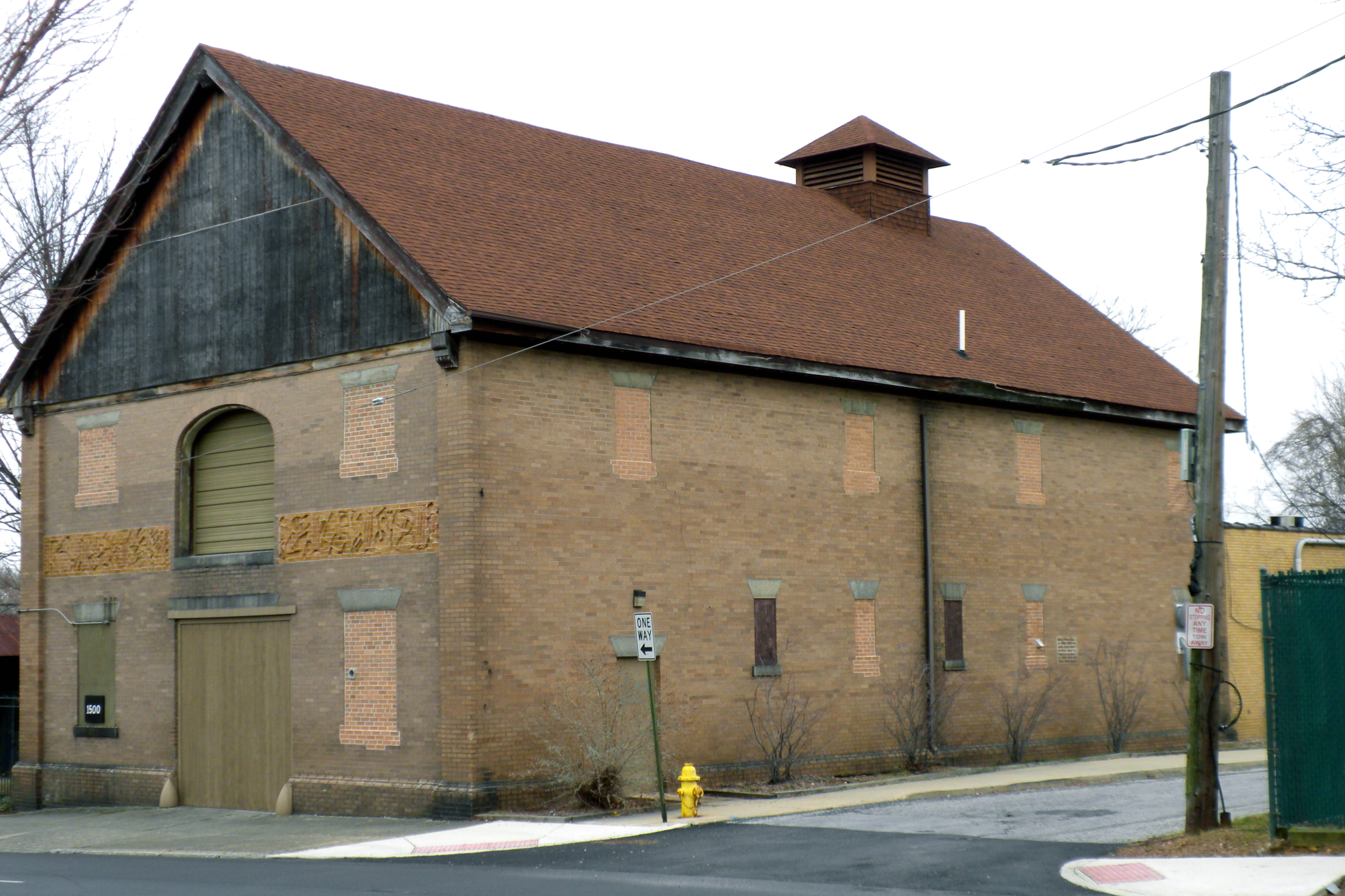
- 1500 Walnut, East Brandywine Historic District, January 2010

- Location within Delaware Location within the United States
- Location: Roughly Bounded by Sixteenth St., Brandywine Creek, Twelfth St., and US 13, Wilmington, Delaware
- Coordinates: 39°44′55″N 75°32′31″W
- Area: 80.3 acres (32.5 ha)
- Architect: Multiple
- Architectural style: Late Victorian, Georgian
- NRHP reference No.: 85003220
- Added to NRHP: December 19, 1985

East Brandywine Historic District is a national historic district located at Wilmington, New Castle County, Delaware. It encompasses 189 contributing buildings located east of the central business district of Wilmington dating from the late-18th to the early-20th century. The buildings reflect a mix of architectural types and styles include industrial buildings, churches, schools, semi-detached houses, rowhouses, apartment houses, restaurants, and stores. Notable non-residential buildings include St. Patrick's Church, Diamond Match Company complex, Security Storage Warehouse, Francis Apartments, Winkler's Restaurant, Delaware Hosiery Manufacturing Company building, F.F. Slocomb Company building. The Howard High School, Kaumagraph Building, and Starr House are located in the district and separately listed.

It was added to the National Register of Historic Places in 1985.
