= New Castle Leather Raw Stock Warehouse =

- U.S. National Register of Historic Places
- U.S. Historic district – Contributing property
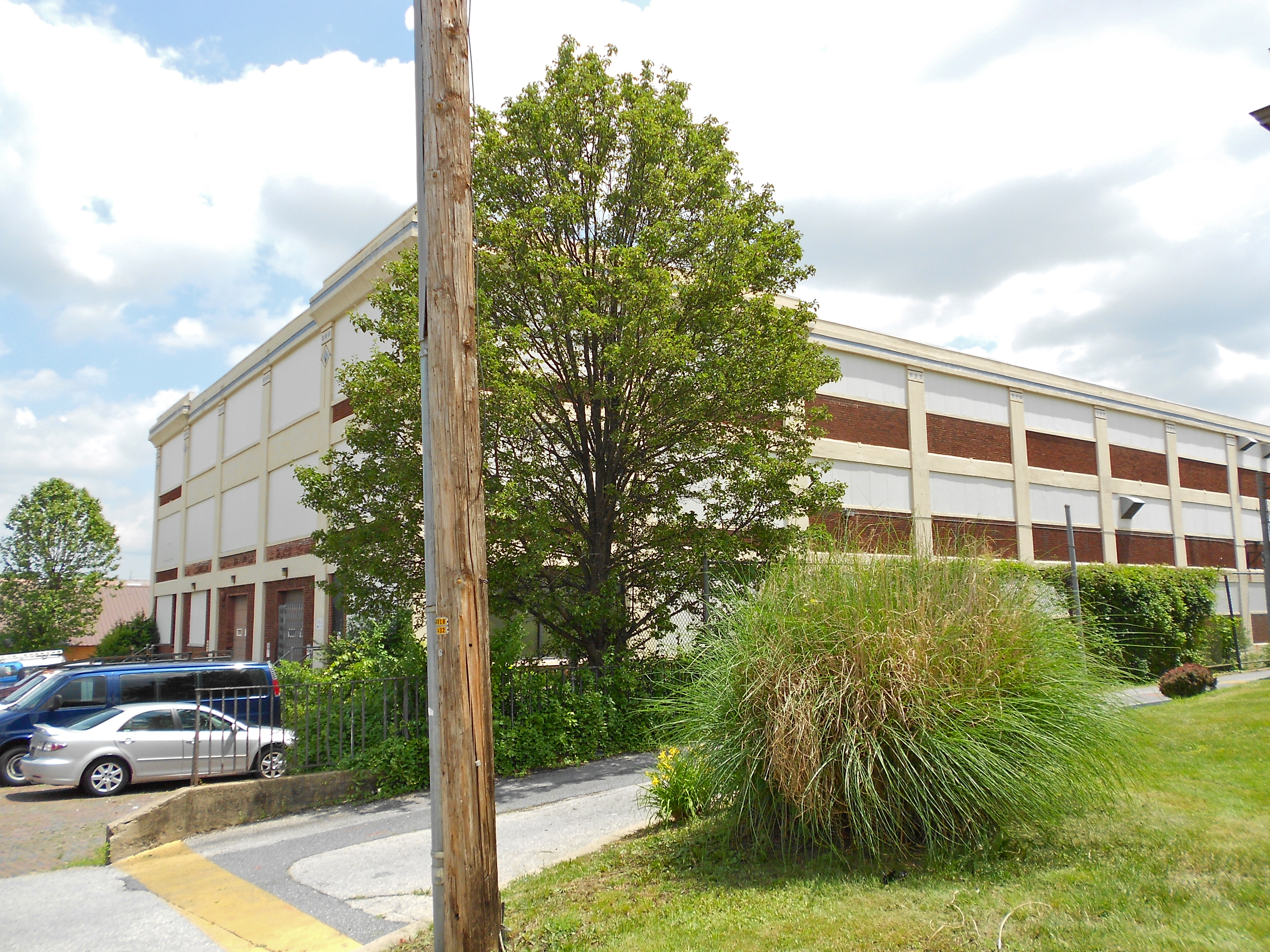

- Location within Delaware Location within the United States
- Location: 14th and Poplar Sts., Wilmington, Delaware
- Coordinates: 39.747047°N 75.541173°W
- Area: 1.6 acres (0.65 ha)
- Built: 1917
- Architectural style: Early Commercial
- NRHP reference No.: 83001401
- Added to NRHP: June 16, 1983

New Castle Leather Raw Stock Warehouse, also known as the Kaumagraph Building, is a historic warehouse building located at Wilmington, New Castle County, Delaware. It was built in 1917, and is a three-story, rectangular steel, concrete, and brick building measuring 100 feet by 200 feet and featuring a projecting roof cornice, flat roof, and large window areas. It is characterized as a fireproof industrial building in the commercial style of the early 1900s. It was originally built as a warehouse to store goatskins for a Wilmington kid leather manufacturer and later housed the plant and offices of a specialty printing firm.

It was added to the National Register of Historic Places in 1983. It is located in the East Brandywine Historic District.

== See also ==
- Main Office of the New Castle Leather Company
