= St Paulinus' Church, New Ollerton =

St Paulinus’ Church, Ollerton
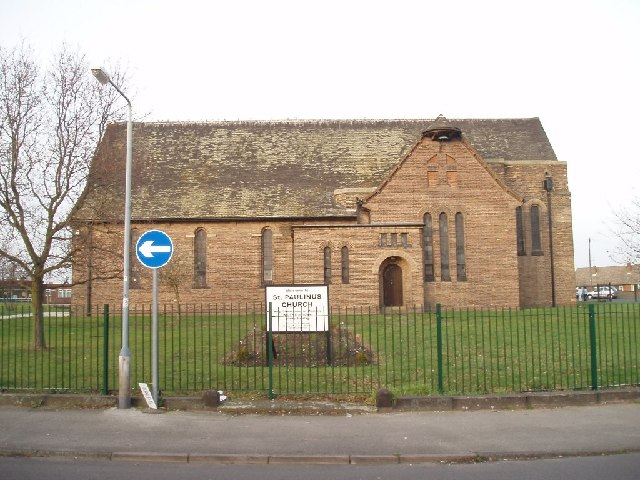
- St Paulinus’ Church, Ollerton
- St Paulinus’ Church, Ollerton
- 53°12′20.86″N 1°0′10.2″W
- OS grid reference: SK 66467 68170
- Location: Ollerton
- Country: England
- Denomination: Church of England

History
- Founder: Butterley Company
- Dedication: St Paulinus
- Consecrated: 1 October 1932

Architecture
- Heritage designation: Grade II listed
- Architect(s): Naylor, Sale and Woore
- Style: Romanesque
- Completed: 1931
- Construction cost: £8,000

Administration
- Diocese: Southwell and Nottingham
- Archdeaconry: Newark
- Deanery: Newark and Southwell
- Parish: Ollerton with Boughton

St Paulinus’ Church, Ollerton is a Grade II listed parish church of the Church of England in Ollerton.

== History ==
The church dates from 1931 and was built by Charles Naylor, George Hanson Sale and Joseph Alfred Woore as Naylor, Sale and Woore of Derby for the Butterley Company.

== Parish status ==
The church is in a joint parish with

- St Matthew's Church, Boughton
- St Giles' Church, Ollerton

== See also ==
- Listed buildings in Ollerton and Boughton
