= Boughton, Nottinghamshire =

Village in Nottinghamshire, England

Coordinates: 53.20°N 00.99°W

Boughton
- Village
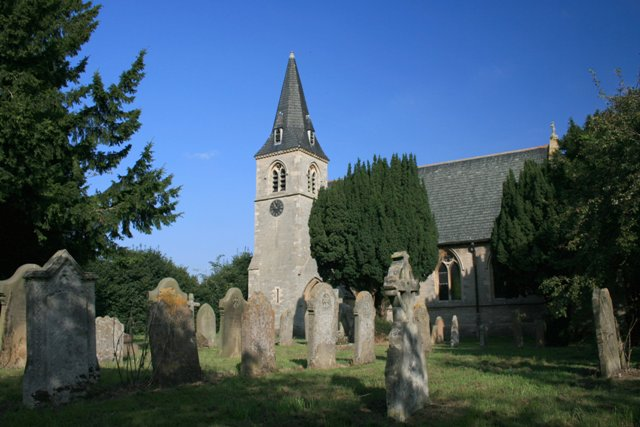
- St Matthew’s Church

- Location within Nottinghamshire
- OS grid reference: SK6768
- Civil parish: Ollerton and Boughton
- District: Newark and Sherwood
- Shire county: Nottinghamshire
- Region: East Midlands
- Country: England
- Sovereign state: United Kingdom
- Post town: Newark
- Postcode district: NG22
- Dialling code: 01623
- Police: Nottinghamshire
- Fire: Nottinghamshire
- Ambulance: East Midlands
- UK Parliament: Sherwood
- Website: https://ollerton-tc.gov.uk

Pronounced
(listen)

Boughton is a village and former civil parish, now in the parish of Ollerton and Boughton, in the Newark and Sherwood district, in Nottinghamshire, England, two miles east of the town of New Ollerton. In 1961 the parish had a population of 1374. On 11 November 1996 the civil parish was abolished and merged with the civil parish of Ollerton to form the new civil parish of "Ollerton and Boughton".

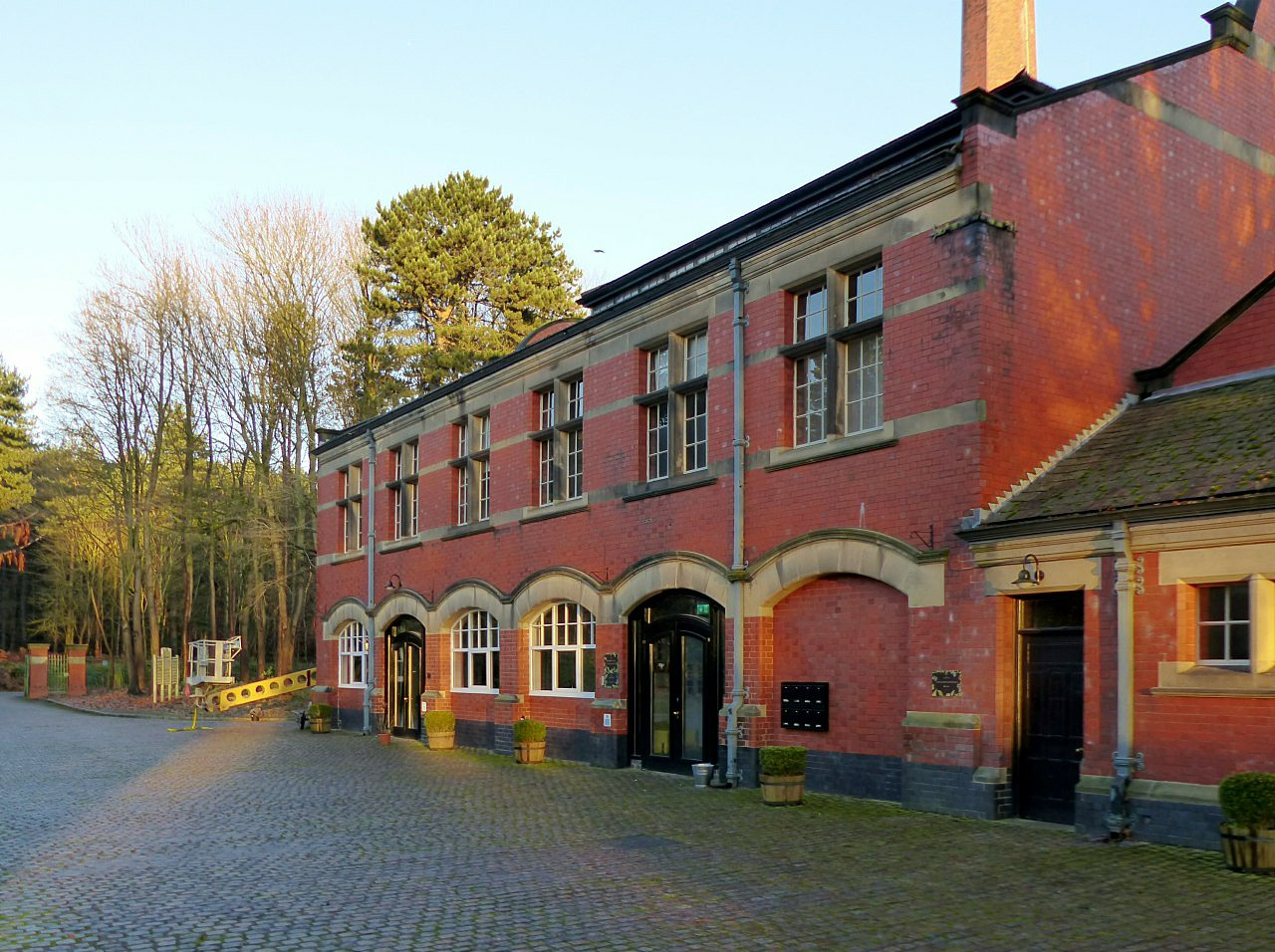
Boughton Pumping Station

Boughton windmill was located close to the present B6381 road (grid reference SK673684).

The parish church is St Matthew's Church, Boughton.

== See also ==
- Listed buildings in Ollerton and Boughton
- Boughton (Nottinghamshire) railway station
