= St Matthew's Church, Boughton =

St Matthew’s Church, Boughton
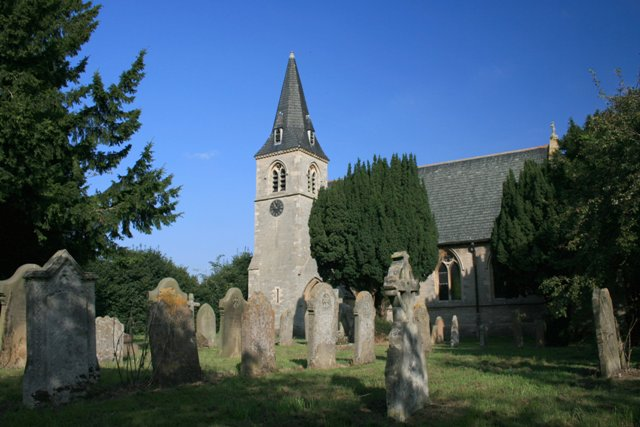
- St Matthew’s Church, Boughton
- St Matthew’s Church, Boughton
- 53°12′33.27″N 0°59′7.38″W
- OS grid reference: SK 67855 68522
- Location: Boughton, Nottinghamshire
- Country: England
- Denomination: Church of England

History
- Dedication: St Matthew
- Consecrated: 15 September 1868

Architecture
- Heritage designation: Grade II listed
- Architect: James Fowler
- Style: Gothic Revival
- Groundbreaking: 19 September 1867
- Completed: 1868

Administration
- Diocese: Southwell and Nottingham
- Archdeaconry: Newark
- Deanery: Newark and Southwell
- Parish: Ollerton with Boughton

St Matthew's Church, Boughton is a Grade II listed parish church in the Church of England in Boughton, Nottinghamshire.

== History ==
The church dates from 1868 and was designed by James Fowler of Louth. It replaced the previous church which had fallen into a dilapidated state.

== Parish status ==
The church is in a joint parish with

- St Giles' Church, Ollerton
- St Paulinus' Church, New Ollerton

St Mathews is no longer used for regular worship but remains part of the parish of Ollerton with Boughton

== Organ ==
The church has a two manual pipe organ by H.S. Vincent and Co dating from 1906. A specification of the organ can be found on the National Pipe Organ Register.

== See also ==
- Listed buildings in Ollerton and Boughton
