= Starr House =

Starr House may refer to:

- Starr Manor, Glenwood Springs, Colorado, listed on the National Register of Historic Places (NRHP) in Garfield County, Colorado
- C. J. Starr Barn and Carriage House, Stamford, Connecticut, NRHP-listed
- Starr House (Wilmington, Delaware), NRHP-listed
- Starr-Truscott House, Birmingham, Ohio, listed on the NRHP in Erie County, Ohio
- Horace C. Starr House and Carriage Barns, Elyria, Ohio, listed on the NRHP in Lorain County, Ohio
- Edwin and Anna Starr House, Monroe, Oregon, listed on the National Register of Historic Places in Benton County, Oregon
- Starr House (Marshall, Texas), listed on the National Register of Historic Places in Harrison County, Texas
- Starr Ranch, Hanksville, Utah, listed on the NRHP in Garfield County, Utah
