= Main Office of the New Castle Leather Company =

- U.S. National Register of Historic Places
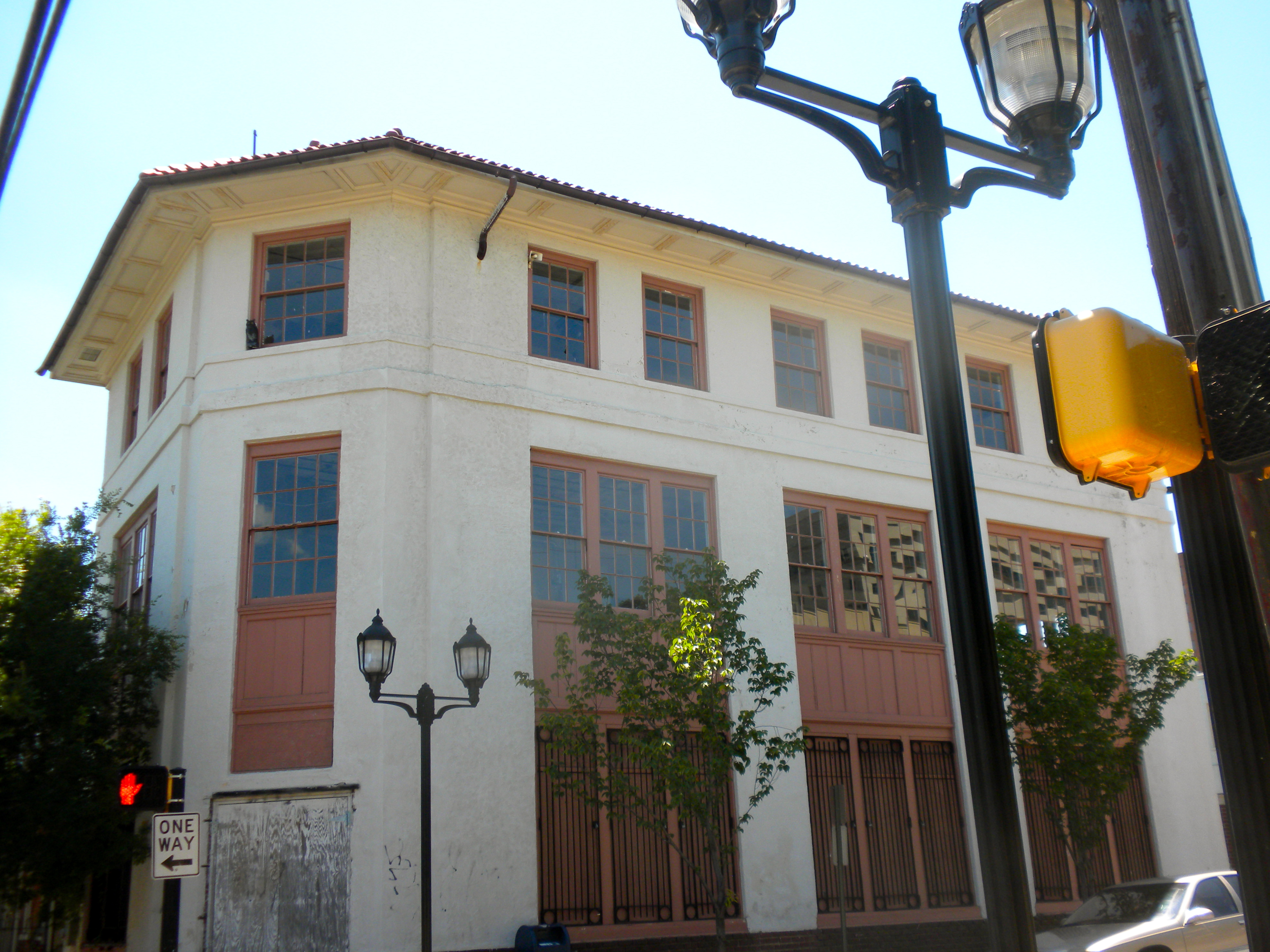
- Main Office of the New Castle Leather Company, June 2010

- Location within Delaware Location within the United States
- Location: Eleventh and Poplar Sts., Wilmington, Delaware
- Coordinates: 39.744813°N 75.543400°W
- Area: 0.5 acres (0.20 ha)
- Built: 1917
- Architectural style: Mission/Spanish Revival
- NRHP reference No.: 85003191
- Added to NRHP: December 19, 1985

Main Office of the New Castle Leather Company, also known as The Main Office of the Allied Kid Company from 1933 to 1977, is a historic office building located at Wilmington, New Castle County, Delaware. It was built in 1917, and is a three-story, steel frame stuccoed brick building in the Mission Revival Style. The building measures 68 feet wide and 30 feet deep. It features a revolving door and curved granite steps at the main entrance, red Mission style tiles on the mansard, and large decorative iron bars and grill work on the first floor windows.

It was added to the National Register of Historic Places in 1985.

== See also ==
- New Castle Leather Raw Stock Warehouse
