= Boughton Pumping Station =

Former water pumping facility

Coordinates: 53.21613°N 1.00143°W

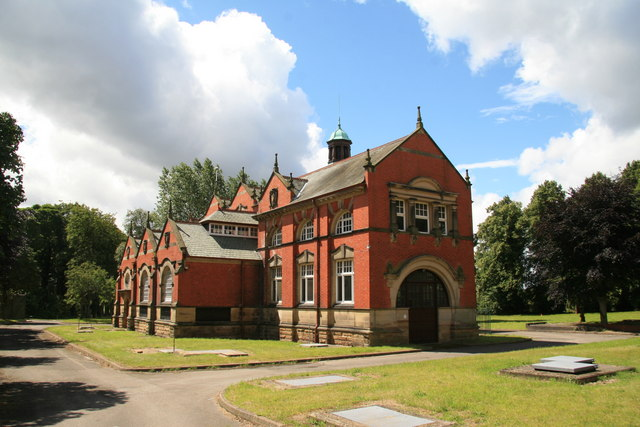
Boughton Pumping Station

Boughton Pumping Station was a water pumping station near New Ollerton in Nottinghamshire, operating from 1905. After closure it became a commercial hospitality venue.

== History ==
Situated on the edge of Sherwood Forest, Boughton Pumping Station opened in 1905 together with an associated Superintendent's house and five workers' cottages.

The Pumping Station later passed into the hands of Severn Trent Water. The engine house was listed as Grade II in 1974. By 1980 it was obsolete and in need of major repair. In 1988 the uncertain future of the building worsened when it suffered from mining subsidence. Boughton Pumping Station Partnership Trust secured funding to restore the buildings and by 1998 the works were complete.

Since its completion in 1998 the Station was operated as a Business Centre by different owners including Boughton Pumping Station Trust, Nottinghamshire County Council and NE Group.

In April 2010 it was privately purchased by Horizon Investments and re-launched as Blackburn House, named after the original Blackburn Engines which pumped the water from underground to supply the City of Nottingham.

In 2012, a plan was mooted to create a museum area within the building.

In 2016, a planning application to convert the building into nine one-bedroom and two-bedroom flats was submitted by Aldred Developments to Newark and Sherwood District Council.

The Pumping Station was repurposed by new owners in 2016 into a new venue for weddings, corporate and private events.

== Equipment ==
The Blackburn Engine House, the main pumphouse, was designed by William Beedham Starr which included a tall brick chimney. The Pumphouse was commissioned by the Nottingham Corporation Water Department and was capable of pumping 20 million imperial gallons (91,000 m3) per day through 15.75 miles (25.35 km) of 30-inch (76 cm) pipe from the underground sandstone Aquifer. There were two Manhattan-type triple-expansion steam engines from Ashton Frost of Blackburn, with standby 130 hp (97 kW) Davy horizontal engine and triple-expansion engine by Fairbairn Lawson Combe Barbour.

A well beneath the building is 165-foot (50 m) deep.

== See also ==
- Bestwood Pumping Station
- Papplewick Pumping Station
- Listed buildings in Ollerton and Boughton
