= Justice Starr =

Justice Starr may refer to:

- Oliver Starr (1883–1961), associate justice of the Supreme Court of Indiana
- Raymond Wesley Starr (1888–1968), associate justice of the Michigan Supreme Court

== See also ==
- Judge Starr (disambiguation)
