= David Starr =

David Starr may refer to:

- David Starr (politician) (born 1943), New Hampshire State Senator
- David Starr (racing driver) (born 1967), American stock car driver
- David Starr (wrestler) (born 1991), American professional wrestler
- David Starr Jordan (1851–1931), American ichthyologist and first president of Indiana University
- David Starr, protagonist of Lucky Starr series by Isaac Asimov
- David Newbury (David Starr Newbury, born 1942), American professor of African studies
- David Ngoombujarra (David Bernard Starr, 1967–2011), Australian actor

== See also ==
- David Starr Jordan High School, Los Angeles
- David Starr, Space Ranger, 1952 juvenile science fiction novel by Isaac Asimov
- NOAAS David Starr Jordan (R 444), American fisheries research vessel
