= Starr House (Wilmington, Delaware) =

Historic house in Delaware, United States

- U.S. National Register of Historic Places
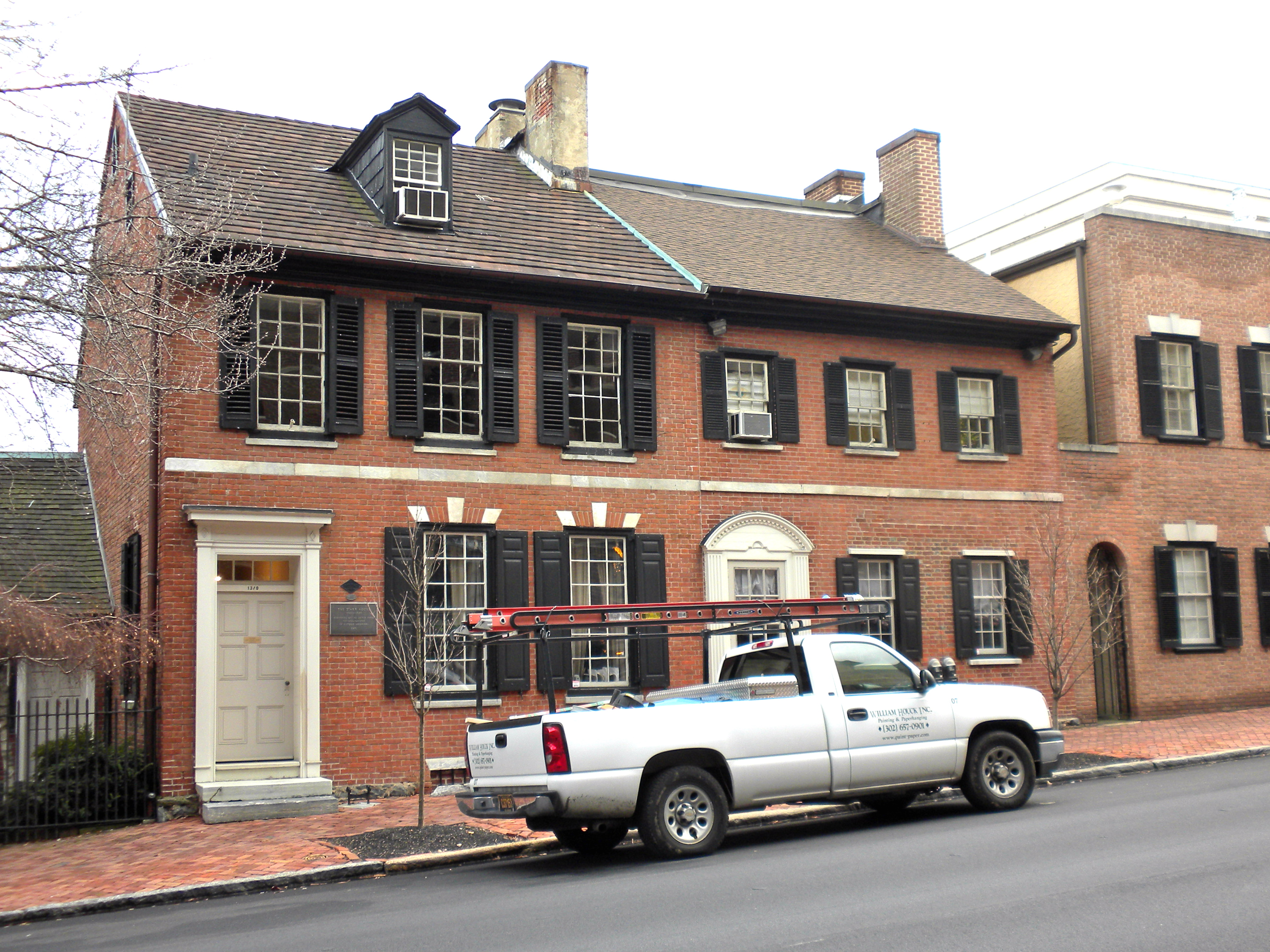
- Starr House, January 2010

- Location within Delaware Location within the United States
- Location: 1310 King St., Wilmington, Delaware
- Coordinates: 39.748141°N 75.544741°W
- Area: 0.1 acres (0.040 ha)
- Built: 1801–1806
- NRHP reference No.: 71000232
- Added to NRHP: March 24, 1971

Starr House, also known as the Michael VanKirk House, is a historic home located at Wilmington, New Castle County, Delaware. It was built between 1801 and 1806, and is 2 1/2-story, brick dwelling with a gable roof. The house was restored in 1946 and considered the last example of colonial architecture in the city of Wilmington. Adjacent to the house is a mid-19th century frame summer kitchen, which contains a beehive oven, has been encased in brick.

It was added to the National Register of Historic Places in 1970. It is located in the East Brandywine Historic District.

Situated on a two-block section of King Street known historically as Wilmington's "Lawyers Row," Starr House is one of a complex of six buildings that serve as the offices of Prickett, Jones & Elliott, P.A., one of Delaware's oldest law firms.
