= Starr, Ohio =

Unincorporated community in Ohio, U.S.

Coordinates: 39°23′49″N 82°21′40″W

Starr is an unincorporated community in Hocking County, in the U.S. state of Ohio.

== History ==
A post office called Star was in operation between 1830 and 1916. The community was named for its location in Starr Township.
