= Sally Starr =

Sally Starr may refer to:

- Sally Starr (actress) (1909–1996), theatrical and movie actress
- Sally Starr (TV hostess) (1923–2013), children's television host
