= Starr (given name) =

Starr is a given name which may refer to:

== People ==
- Starr Andreeff, Canadian actress
- Starr Andrews (born 2001), American figure skater
- Starr Faithfull (1906–1931), American socialite
- Starr Roxanne Hiltz, American retired computer scientist
- Starr Kempf (1917–1995), American sculptor
- Starr Long (born 1970), American game developer
- Starr Parodi (fl. 1988–present), American composer
- Starr Walton (born 1942), American alpine skier

== Fictional characters ==
- Starr the Slayer, a Marvel Comics hero
- Starr Carter, protagonist of The Hate U Give
- Starr Manning, on the soap opera One Life to Live

== See also ==
- Star (name), given name and surname
