= Richard Starr =

Richard Starr may refer to:

- Richard C. Starr (1924–1998), American phycologist
- Richard Dean Starr (born 1968), American entrepreneur, editor and author of fiction and graphic novels
- Dick Starr (Richard Eugene Starr, 1921–2017), Major League Baseball player
- Richard Felix Staar (1923–2018), American political scientist and historian
- Richard B. Starr, one of the architects of the Starr-Bowkett Society
- Ringo Starr (Richard Starkey, born 1940), member of The Beatles
