= Bob Starr =

Bob Starr, Bobby Starr or Robert Star may refer to:

- Bob Starr (sportscaster) (1933–1998), former American sportscaster
- Bob Starr (wrestler) (born 1971), semi-retired American professional wrestler
- Bobby Starr, singer
- Robert A. Starr, politician
- Robert H. Starr, aircraft designer
