= Ollerton =

Village in Nottinghamshire, England

Coordinates: 53.20°N 1.02°W

- Village
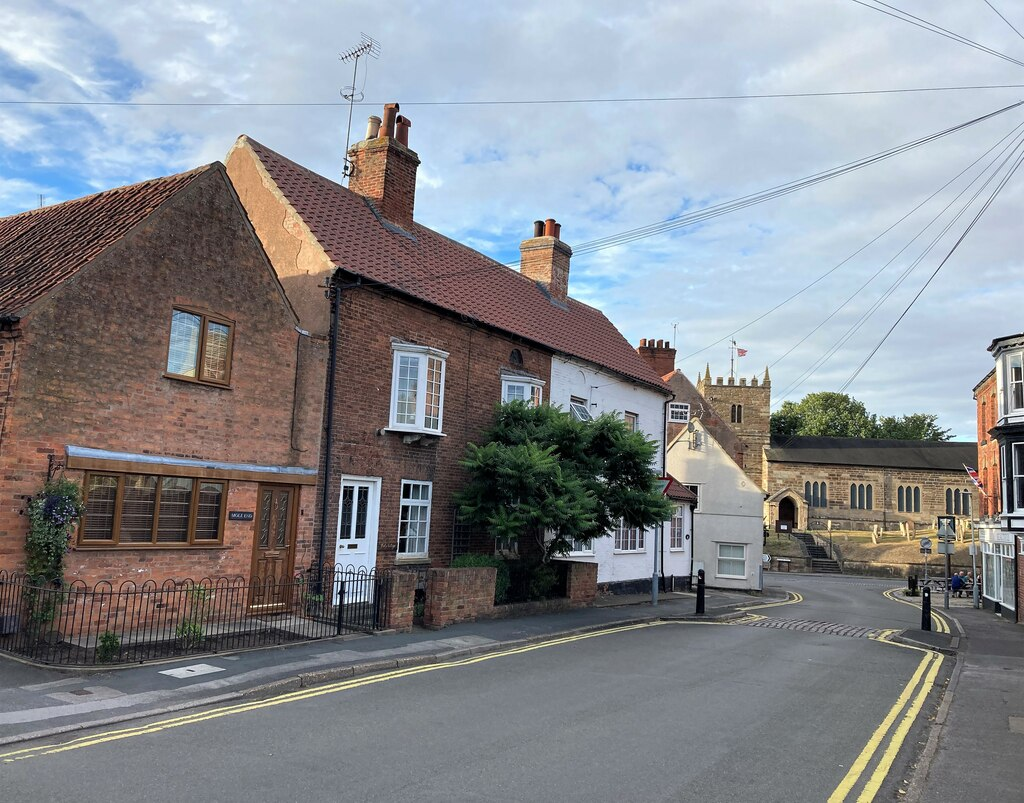
- Ollerton Village

- Location within Nottinghamshire
- Population: 11,103 (2021 Census)
- OS grid reference: SK655675
- Civil parish: Ollerton and Boughton
- District: Newark and Sherwood
- Shire county: Nottinghamshire
- Region: East Midlands
- Country: England
- Sovereign state: United Kingdom
- Post town: NEWARK
- Postcode district: NG22
- Dialling code: 01623
- Police: Nottinghamshire
- Fire: Nottinghamshire
- Ambulance: East Midlands
- UK Parliament: Sherwood
- Website: https://ollerton-tc.gov.uk

Ollerton is a village and former civil parish, now in the parish of Ollerton and Boughton, in the Newark and Sherwood district, in the county of Nottinghamshire, England, on the edge of Sherwood Forest in the area known as the Dukeries. The population of Ollerton and Boughton at the 2011 census was 9,840.

The area is sometimes differentiated locally using the names New Ollerton for the post-1900 expansion, compared with Old Ollerton referring to the original village clustered around the church, river and mill.

== History ==
The name Ollerton is derived from the Old English alortūn meaning 'alder settlement'.

Ollerton is a settlement listed in Domesday Book, located in the Bassetlaw Wapentake or hundred in the county of Nottinghamshire at a crossing of the River Maun. In 1086 it had a recorded population of 15 households, and is listed in the Domesday Book under two owners.

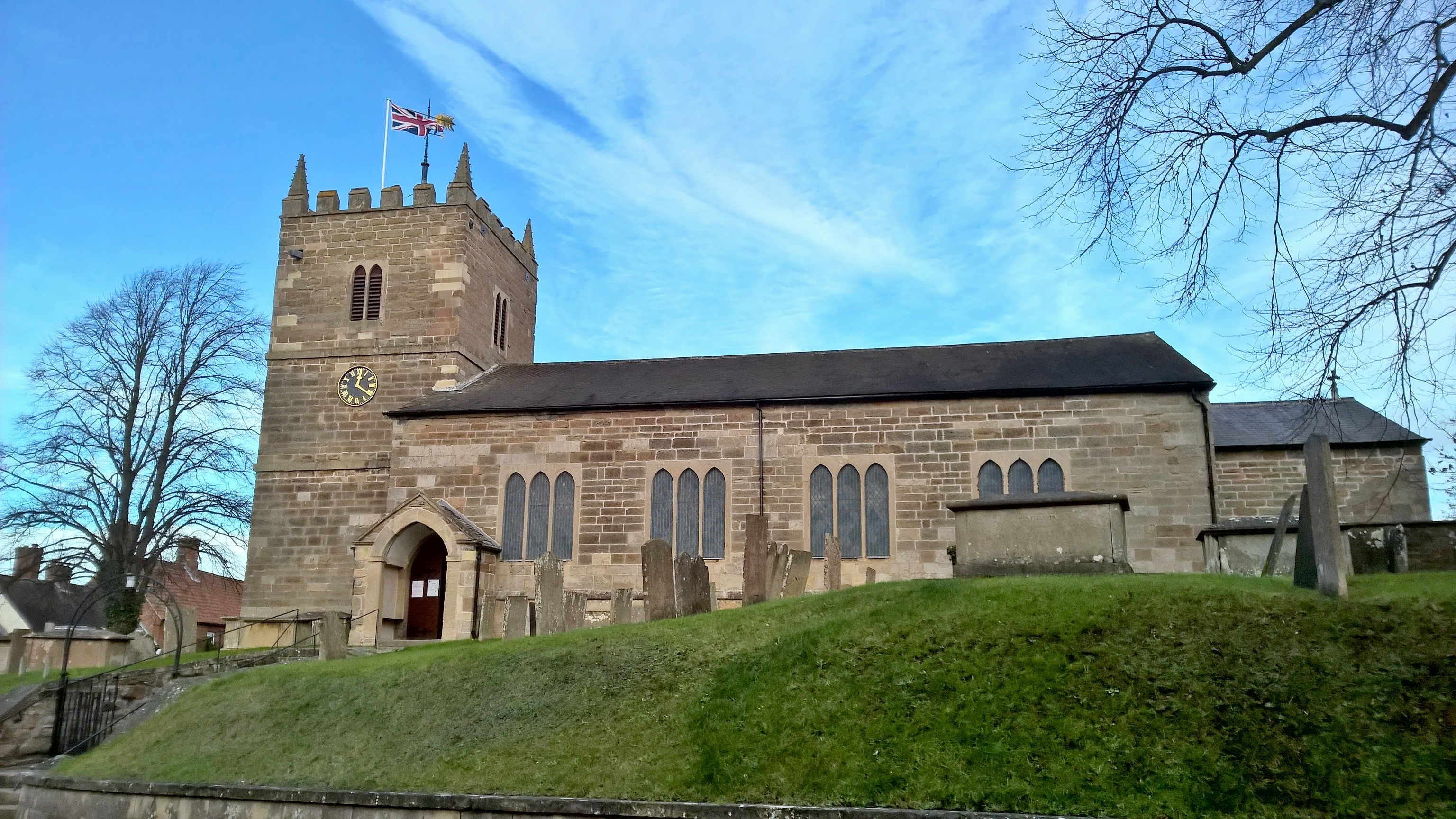
St Giles Church

Formerly a rural village with a tradition of hop-growing centred on the parish church of St Giles, the settlement has its origins at a point where three main routes crossed. The A614 linking Nottingham north through Sherwood Forest to Blyth, Nottinghamshire and on to Doncaster; the A6075 linking Mansfield with the ferry crossing of the River Trent at Dunham-on-Trent and on via the A57 road to the cathedral city of Lincoln, England; and the A616 linking Sheffield with the Great North Road Great Britain at Newark-on-Trent.

Ollerton was an ancient parish, and became a civil parish in 1866. The civil parish was abolished on 1 November 1996 and merged with the parish of Boughton to form the new civil parish of Ollerton and Boughton. In 1961 the parish had a population of 5529.

=== The Industrial Revolution and New Ollerton ===
From the 1920s onwards the main industry was coal mining with Ollerton expanding greatly during the 1960s and 1970s, having the name New Ollerton.

The colliery was sunk in the 1920s and completed during the General Strike of 1926, which led to a saying of "Ollerton was ever built with scab labour".

The coal mine was established and funded by the Butterley Company, having an historic base of coal and iron ore mining in nearby Derbyshire; they created a model village in Ollerton for the colliery higher management and workers. A hosiery factory was established in 1937 to provide work for the miners' wives.

During the expansion of the pit, many miners from closed collieries in north-eastern England and Scotland moved to work at Ollerton. There was a large Polish community amongst the miners at Ollerton, estimated to make up roughly half the workforce at the time of the 1984-1985 strike.

Ollerton Colliery was considered one of the most left-wing pits in Nottinghamshire, and was subject to heavy picketing at the time of the ballot by the Nottinghamshire branch of the National Union of Mineworkers in March 1984. A miner from Ackton Hall Colliery, near Featherstone, West Yorkshire died at Ollerton when picketing during the miners' strike on 15 April 1984. David Gareth Jones was hit in the neck by a brick thrown by a local youth when he was picketing, but the post-mortem ruled that it had not caused his death and that it was more likely to have been caused by being pressed against the pit gates earlier in the day. News of his death led to hundreds of pickets staying in Ollerton town centre overnight. At the request of Nottinghamshire Police, Arthur Scargill appeared and called for calm in the wake of the tragedy. However, several working miners in Ollerton reported that their gardens and cars had been vandalised during the night. A memorial bench was sited near the spot where David died. As a mark of respect for Jones, Ollerton Colliery closed for a few days afterwards.

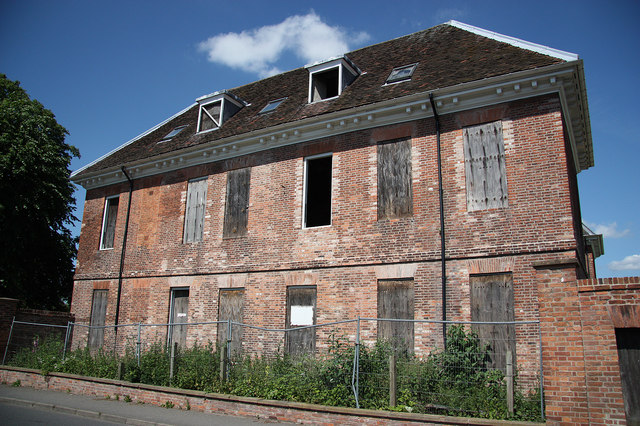
Ollerton Hall near the centre of Old Ollerton in 2010. Unused and semi-derelict from 1970s, various schemes have been considered to re-purpose the 1700s Grade 2* listed at-risk structure as residential apartments and care-facilities, including as a Sue Ryder home.

During the strike, the miners' banner went missing; after it was found in Southampton, the banner was restored by a Cheshire-based fabric conservator. A grant of £9,500 from Nottinghamshire County Council's Local Improvement Scheme was made available by local-resident, county councillor Stella Smedley, MBE. The banner was re-dedicated at New Ollerton's St Paulinus Church in May 2013.

== Regeneration ==
Ollerton Hall, in disrepair for decades, is now being renovated. After purchase by Newark and Sherwood District Council, it will become 10 apartments. As of July 2026, an estate agent was offering 999-year leases on 'new' apartments.

The mine closed in 1994, losing around 1,000 jobs. A group of locals including past colliery workers had a vision to try to establish a new facility that would – at least – provide as many new jobs as were lost. A non-profit organisation run by 10 trustees was established to raise "...just under £50,000" to purchase the 125-acre colliery footprint from British Coal.

A further £4.25 million was needed to reclaim and clean up the land, which was redeveloped as an ecologically sustainable business park of commercial offices occupying 40-acres, named Sherwood Energy Village.

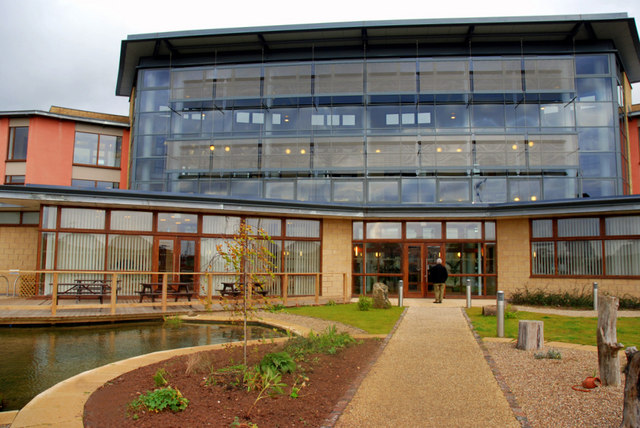
Sherwood Energy Village headquarters in 2006

Key-tenants, including Center Parcs and Nottinghamshire County Council, were responsible for creating their own buildings, with an emphasis on low-energy consumption by using advanced materials and technology including ground source heat pumps. Included into the layout was a nearby Tesco superstore.

The original development organisation failed in 2010 and went into administration, citing difficult trading conditions after the worldwide 2008 financial crisis, having created 500 more jobs than the original 1,000 target, and having been awarded the inaugural Enterprising Britain Award in 2005.

== Landmarks ==
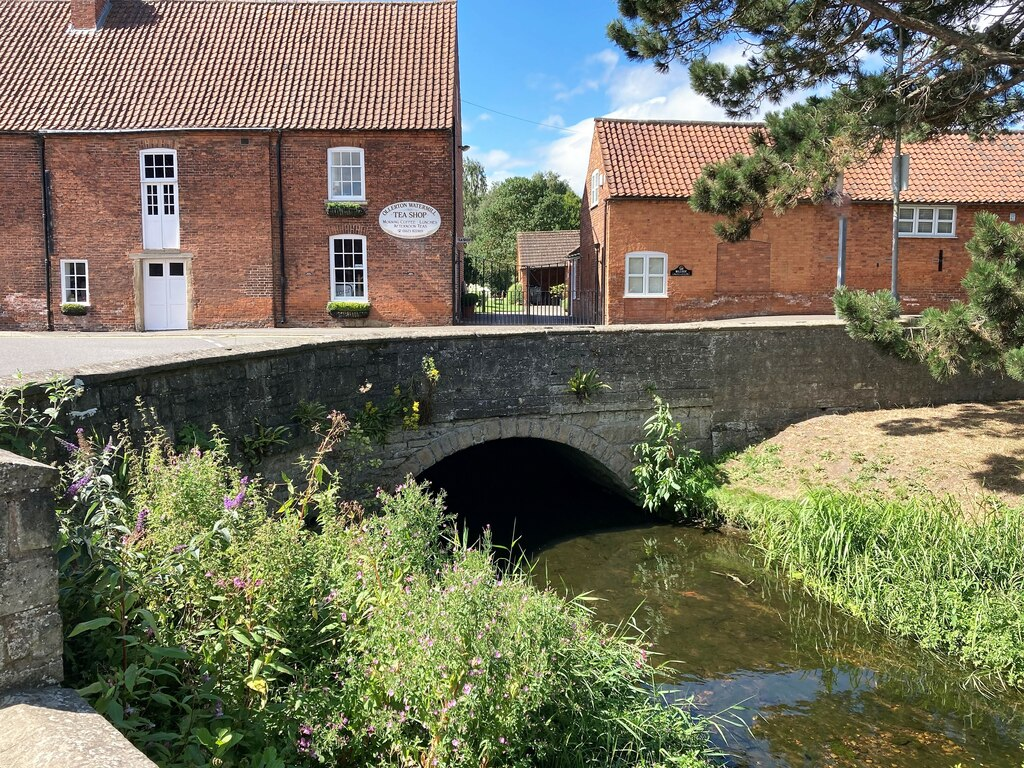
Ollerton Water Mill

In the old part of the original village, Ollerton Watermill was built in 1713 on the River Maun. It operated commercially producing flour until 1984. Restored in 1993, it now houses a teashop and exhibition.

== Sport ==
Ollerton has a local football team, Ollerton Town F.C. who play in the Central Midlands Alliance Premier Division North

== Public transport ==
Ollerton is served by Stagecoach Mansfield, Travel Wright. Stagecoach Bassetlaw run the Sherwood Arrow between Worksop/Retford-Ollerton-Nottingham every 60 minutes.

Ollerton was served by a station on the Shirebrook to Lincoln line. The line is in use for track testing between Dukeries Junction and Shirebrook, but the through route to Lincoln closed in 1980. There has been some ambition to reinstate passenger train services to the town by using the current test-track route from Shirebrook on the Robin Hood Line to a terminus at Ollerton, with potential stations at Warsop and Edwinstowe.

== Ollerton roundabout ==
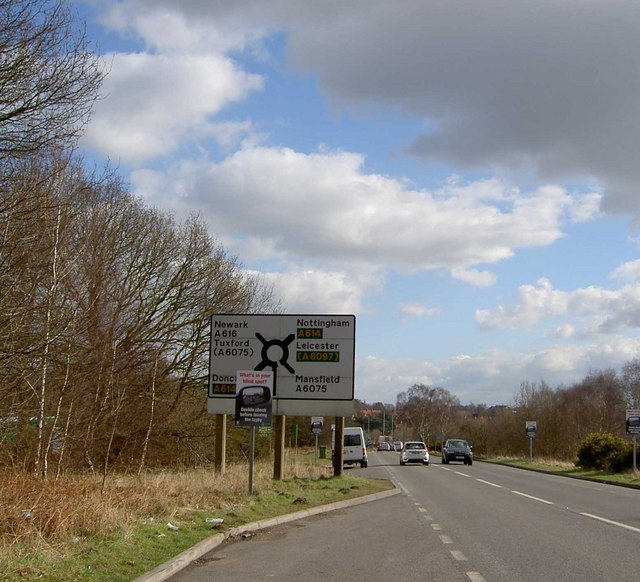
Road sign showing five ways on A616 approaching Ollerton roundabout from Worksop direction; the A616 goes roughly straight across the roundabout to Newark, whereas the A614 runs left towards Doncaster and right towards Nottingham. The A6075 connecting towards Mansfield runs into the roundabout to right of camera position.

Ollerton roundabout on the main A614 road is a five-way junction linking to Ollerton and surrounding areas. Despite a small measure of improvement in 2010 to try to create better traffic flow by white-line marking a separate left-turn lane when joining the A614 from the A616 exiting Ollerton, Ollerton roundabout is considered a major long-term traffic bottleneck, with highways project-ambitions for major expansion necessitating compulsory purchase land-acquisition.

Speaking in October 2024 after the budget, Conservative politician Ben Bradley, then-leader of Nottinghamshire County Council, stated an anticipated £26 million roads plan to include Ollerton was uncertain after the change of government to Labour following the July 2024 general election. In August 2024, Bradley had queried government commitment after then-transport secretary Louise Haigh in July 2024 announced a wide-ranging Transport Infrastructure Review. Haigh resigned in late 2024.

The failure to progress highway improvements was stated to be running at an additional £2 million per year, and also is a significant planning restriction for limiting the amount of new-build housing intended for the nearby brownfield regeneration site of the former Thoresby Colliery.

== Media ==
Ollerton receives its television signals from various transmitters: Waltham, Emley Moor, and Belmont TV transmitters.

Local radio stations are BBC Radio Nottingham, Capital East Midlands, Smooth East Midlands, and Bowe Radio, a community based radio station.

The 'Roundabout' is a community led newspaper that delivers free to all households in Ollerton & Boughton.

== Notable residents ==
Ollerton is the birthplace of Tim Flear OBE, MVO, former career diplomat and HM Consul-General in Rio de Janeiro, Brazil 2006–10 and Milan, Italy 2014–19. The children's writer and book illustrator Kathleen Frances Barker was born in Ollerton.

== Trivia ==
Ollerton features in a related song by Australian singer Darren Hayes entitled "A Hundred Challenging Things A Boy Can Do" on his 2007 album This Delicate Thing We've Made.

== See also ==
- Listed buildings in Ollerton and Boughton
