= William Beedham Starr =

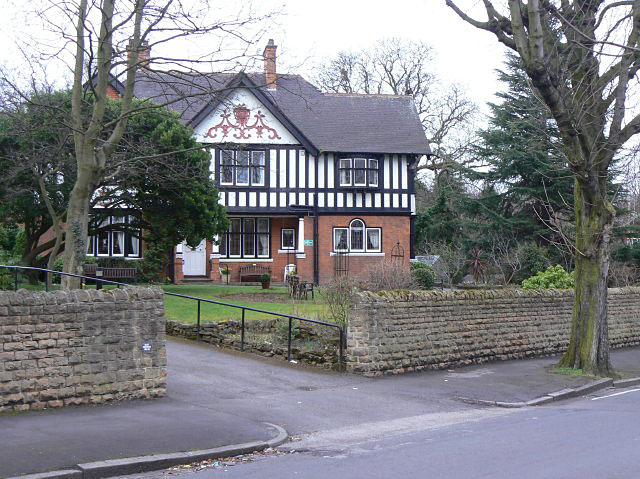
Starr's home, Northfield, 470 Mansfield Road, Nottingham 1906

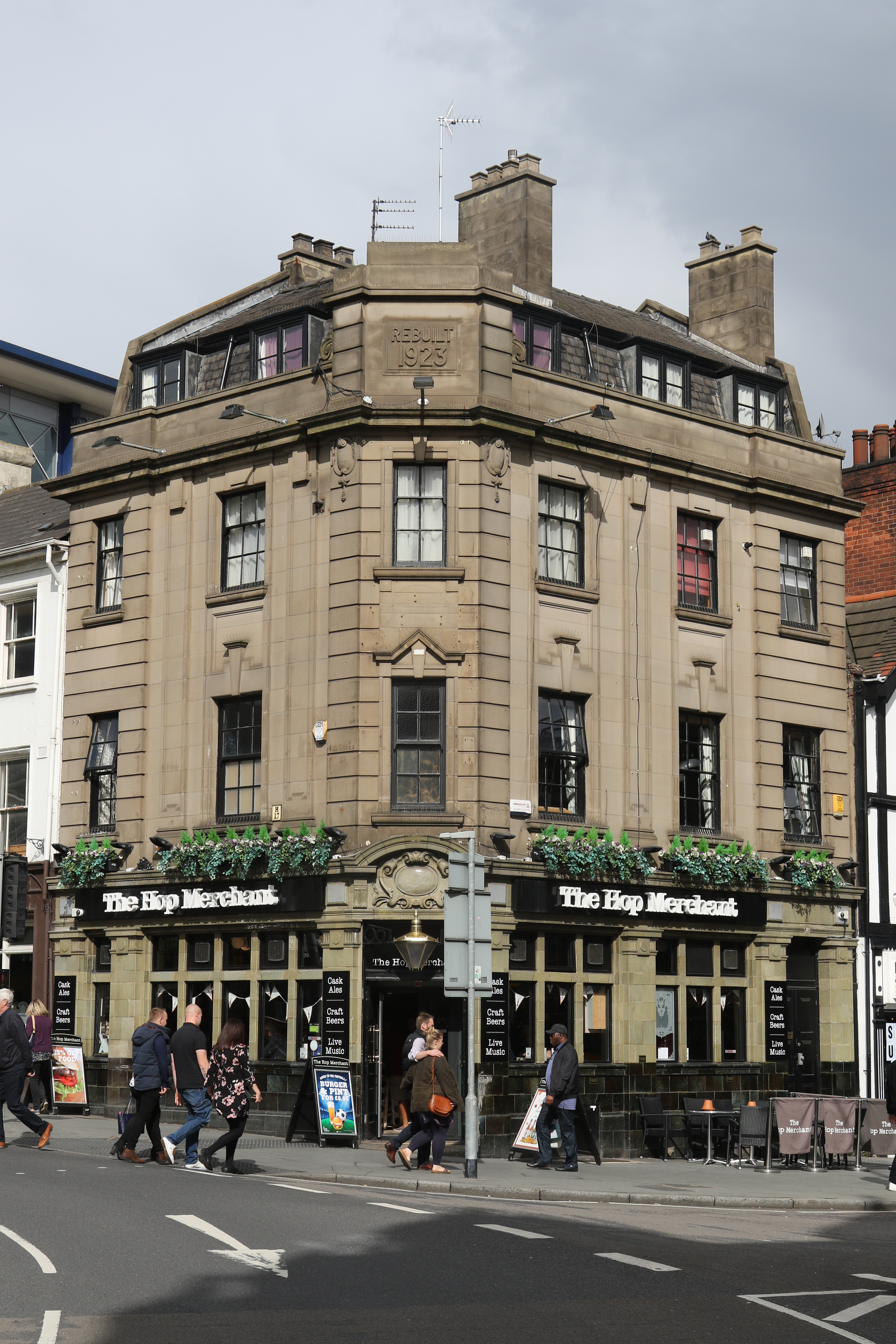
The Turf Tavern, Upper Parliament Street, Nottingham, 1923, now the Hop Merchant

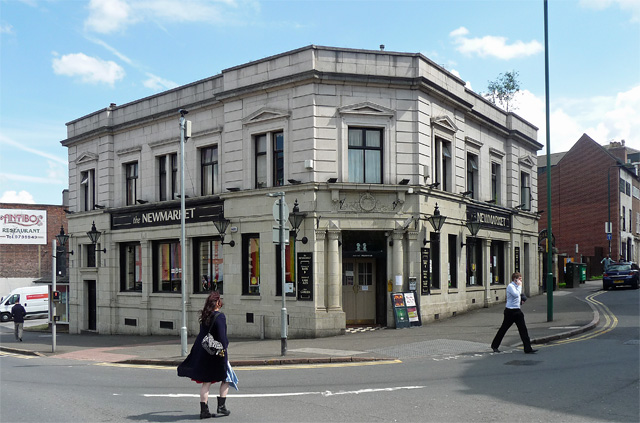
The Newmarket, Lower Parliament Street, Nottingham, 1929

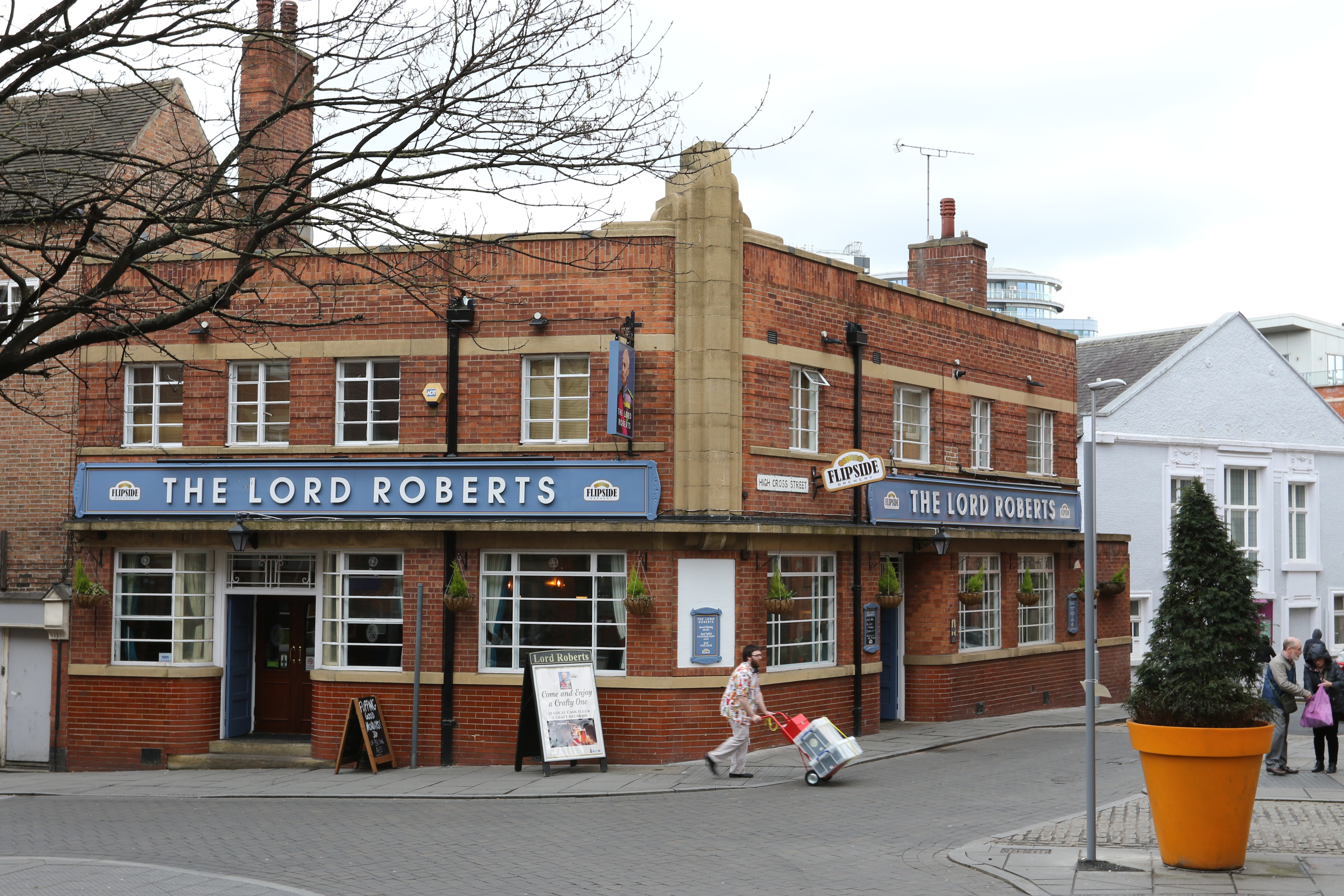
The High Cross Pub, Nottingham, 1936–37, now the Lord Roberts

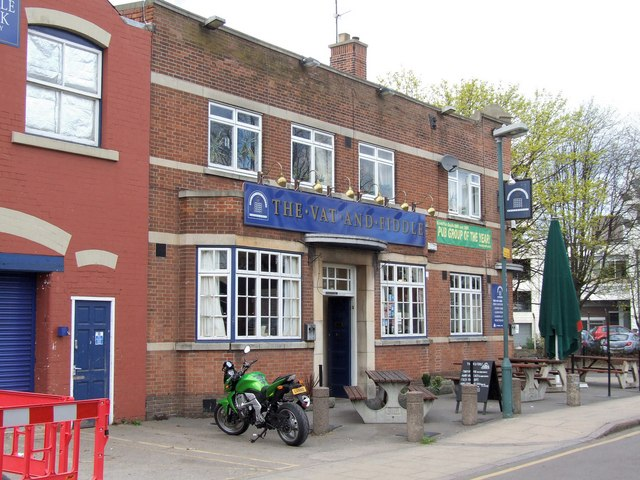
The Grove public house, Nottingham, 1938, now the Vat and Fiddle

William Beedham Starr JP (1865- 2 November 1953) was an architect based in Nottingham, England.

== History ==
He was born in 1865 in Quorndon, Leicestershire to Thomas Starr (1832-1918) and Arabella Beedham (1833-1921). He married Emily Ida Kirkness in 1890 in Scarborough. In 1891 he was listed as living at 12 Stratford Square, Nottingham. He was a liberal councillor and in 1906 appointed Justice of the Peace for Nottinghamshire.

He was articled to Lawrence Bright and then he established himself in business around 1898 with offices in Rutland Chambers, 12 St Peter's Gate, Nottingham. He designed a number of houses in Mapperley Park Estate from 1906 to 1914. Starr built his own house, Northfield at 470 Mansfield Road on the estate. He had offices at 12 Victoria Street, Nottingham.

In 1910 he entered into a partnership with Edwin Benjamin Holmes Hall (1883-1939), and for 29 years they practised as W. B. Starr and Hall, until Hall's death in 1939.

He died on 2 November 1953 at 18 Baker Street, Nottingham and left an estate valued at £51,985 11s 4d (equivalent to £1,833,400 in 2023).

== Works ==
- Furniture Store, Angel Row 1898 (former Nottingham Central Library)
- 15, 17, 19 Montague Street, Beeston, Nottingham 1902
- Boughton Pumping Station 1904-05
- Minor pump house, Broughton Pumping Station, 1905
- Northfield, 470 Mansfield Road, Nottingham 1906
- 2 Chapel Bar, Nottingham 1908
- Solicitor's Office for EH Fraser & Son, 84 Friar Lane, Nottingham 1910
- Edwards Lane Infants Home, Nottingham 1911 alterations
- 6 and 8, Mabel Grove, West Bridgford 1913
- 16 Victoria Street, Nottingham 1913 Former Imperial Fire and Life Insurance Company office converted to the Reform Club
- Falcon Inn, Alfreton Road, Nottingham 1919 alterations
- Queen's Hotel, Queen's Road, Beeston 1922 alterations
- Boat Inn, Priory Street, Lenton, Nottingham 1922-23
- The Lamp public House, Sneinton Road, Nottingham 1923 (In 2017 the New Castle)
- The Sherwood Inn, Mansfield Road, Nottingham 1923 extension
- Turf Tavern, South Sherwood Street, Nottingham 1923 (In 2018 the Hop Merchant)
- Dog and Partridge public house, Lower Parliament Street, Nottingham 1925 extended
- Shop, 666 Mansfield Road (corner of Hall Street, Nottingham 1925.
- Nottingham Journal Offices, Parliament Street, Nottingham. 1926-27 Extension
- Nottingham Permanent Building Society, 20-24 Friar Lane, Nottingham 1928-29
- White Swan public house, Church Street, Basford, Nottingham 1928
- National Westminster Bank, Mansfield Road (corner of Hucknall Road), Nottingham 1928 (In 2017 Masala Junction restaurant)
- Old Plough Public House, Nottingham 1928-29
- New Children's Hospital, Bagthorpe, Nottingham 1929-30
- New Market Hotel, Lower Parliament Street, Nottingham 1929
- YWCA, Shakespeare Street, Nottingham 1929-30 addition of a corner hall and gymnasium
- The Exchange public house, 6 Poultry, Nottingham 1931
- The Plough Inn public house, St Peter's Street, Radford, Nottingham 1931 rebuilding
- The Wheatsheaf public house, 282 Nuthall Road, Nottingham 1931
- Porchester Hotel public house, 806 Woodborough Road, Nottingham 1931-32
- The Crown public house, Western Boulevard/Radford Bridge Road, Nottingham 1933
- White Lion, Carlton Road, Nottingham 1935
- Admiral Duncan public house, Lower Parliament Street, Nottingham 1935
- Hugh Stewart Hall, University Park, Nottingham 1935-38 addition of quadrangle accommodation
- Queen's Hotel, Queen's Road, Beeston 1936 alterations
- High Cross public house, Broad Street, Nottingham 1936-37 (In 2017 the Lord Roberts)
- Spread Eagle Hotel, Goldsmith Street, 1937 (In 2017 the Horn in Hand)
- The Fox public house, Valley Road, Nottingham 1937
- Shops and offices, junction of George Street and Lower Parliament Street, Nottingham 1937-38
- The Grove public house, Queen's Bridge Road, Nottingham 1938 (now the Vat and Fiddle)
