= Phil Starr =

British entertainer (1932–2005)

Phil Starr (March 31, 1932 - October 18, 2005), birth name Arthur James Fuller, was a gay cabaret comedian, singer, mainstay and regular feature of the London and English south coast gay scene during a career spanning from the 1950s, until his sudden and unexpected death. Famous within his genre and locale, Starr's act was typically old school: comic, lengthy shaggy dog stories, often culminating in a hilarious, unexpected twist.
