= New Ollerton =

Town in Nottinghamshire, England

- Town
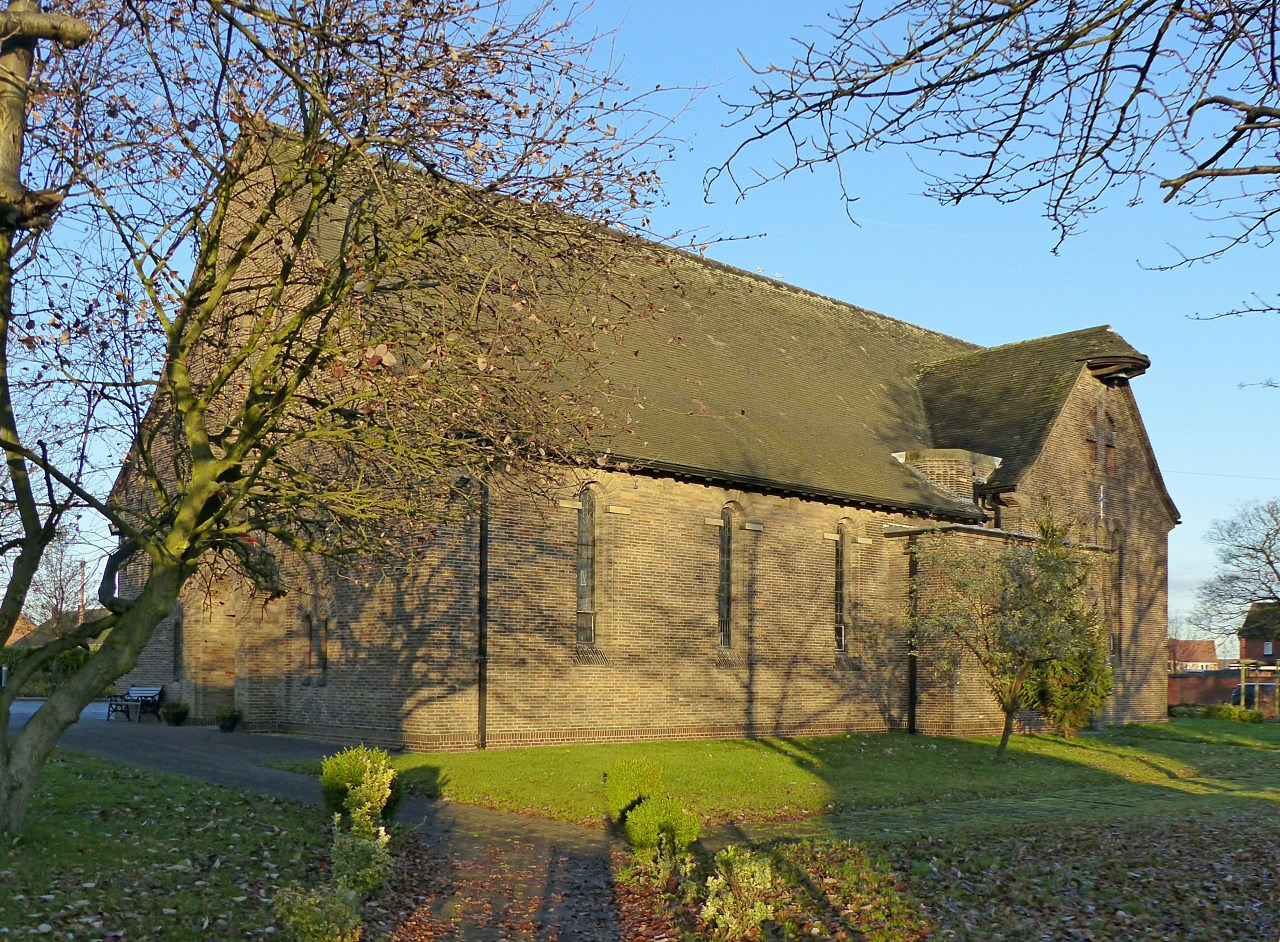
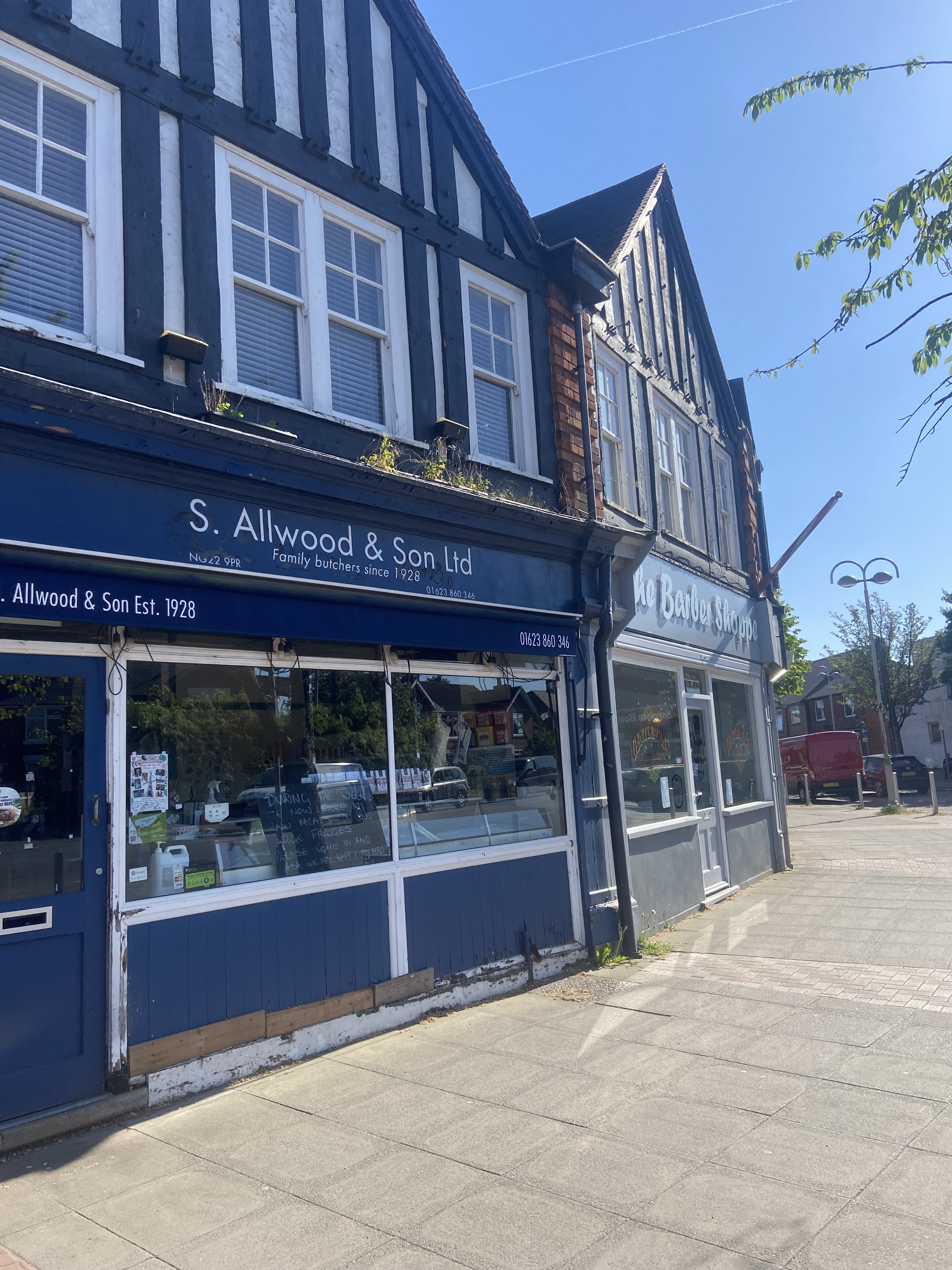
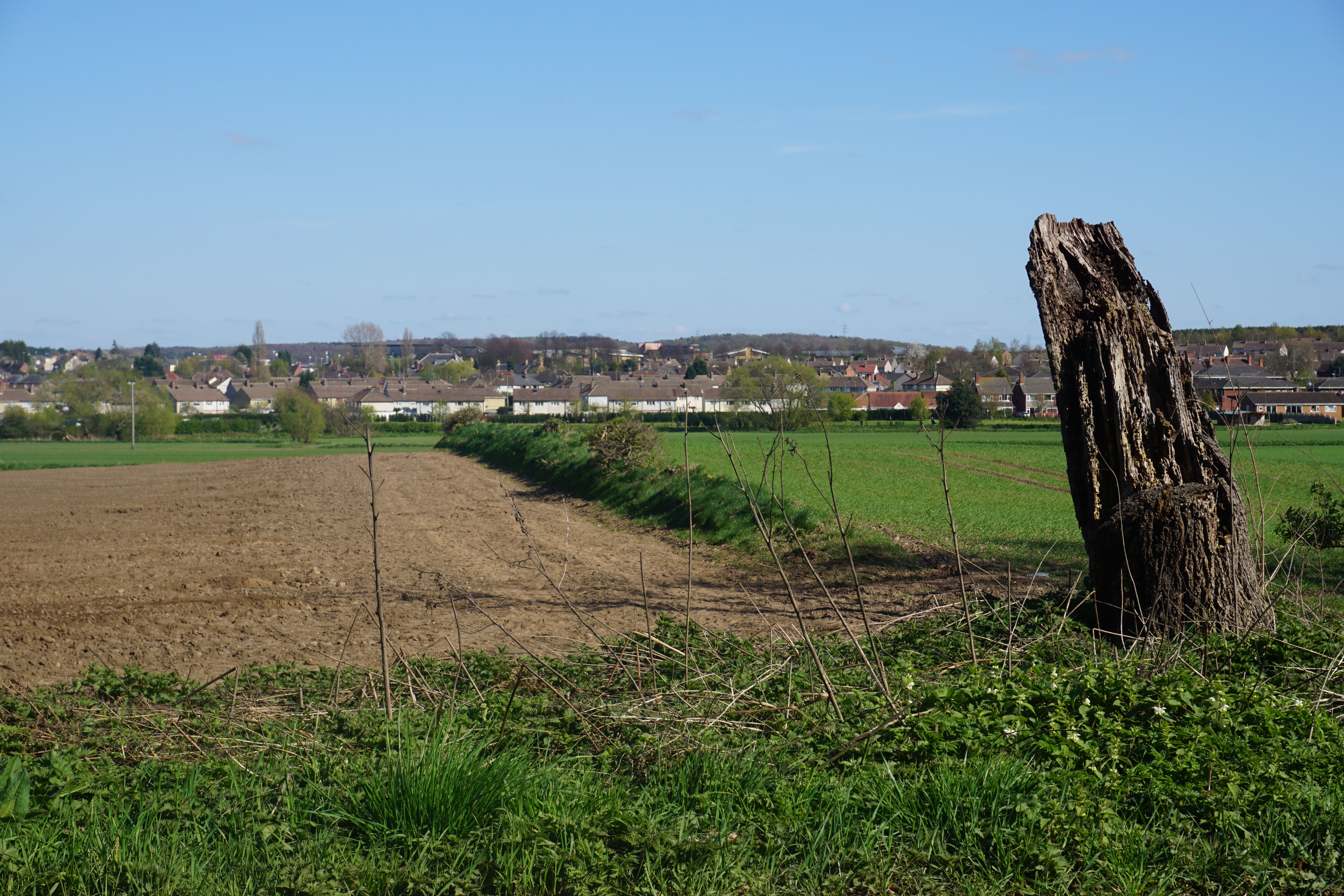
- St Paulinus Church Forest Road From a distance
- Interactive map of New Ollerton
- Civil parish: Ollerton and Boughton
- District: Newark and Sherwood
- Shire county: Nottinghamshire
- Region: East Midlands
- Country: England
- Sovereign state: United Kingdom
- Post town: Newark
- Postcode district: NG22
- Dialling code: 01623
- Police: Nottinghamshire
- Fire: Nottinghamshire
- Ambulance: East Midlands
- UK Parliament: Newark
- Website: https://ollerton-tc.gov.uk

New Ollerton is a town in the parish of Ollerton and Boughton, Newark and Sherwood district, in the county of Nottinghamshire, England, on the edge of Sherwood Forest. The population of Ollerton and Boughton at the 2011 census was 9,840. The town is close to the villages of Ollerton and Boughton.

== History ==
=== Industrial Revolution ===
From the 1920s onwards the main industry was coal mining with Ollerton expanding greatly during the 1960s and 1970s, having the name New Ollerton.

The colliery was sunk in the 1920s and completed during the General Strike of 1926, which led to a saying of "Ollerton was ever built with scab labour".

The coal mine was established and funded by the Butterley Company, having an historic base of coal and iron ore mining in nearby Derbyshire; they created a model village in Ollerton for the colliery higher management and workers. A hosiery factory was established in 1937 to provide work for the miners' wives.

During the expansion of the pit, many miners from closed collieries in north-eastern England and Scotland moved to work at Ollerton. There was a large Polish community amongst the miners at Ollerton, estimated to make up roughly half the workforce at the time of the 1984-1985 strike.

Ollerton Colliery was considered one of the most left-wing pits in Nottinghamshire, and was subject to heavy picketing at the time of the ballot by the Nottinghamshire branch of the National Union of Mineworkers in March 1984. A miner from Ackton Hall Colliery, near Featherstone, West Yorkshire died at Ollerton when picketing during the miners' strike on 15 April 1984. David Gareth Jones was hit in the neck by a brick thrown by a local youth when he was picketing, but the post-mortem ruled that it had not caused his death and that it was more likely to have been caused by being pressed against the pit gates earlier in the day. News of his death led to hundreds of pickets staying in Ollerton town centre overnight. At the request of Nottinghamshire Police, Arthur Scargill appeared and called for calm in the wake of the tragedy. However, several working miners in Ollerton reported that their gardens and cars had been vandalised during the night. A memorial bench was sited near the spot where David died. As a mark of respect for Jones, Ollerton Colliery closed for a few days afterwards.

== Economy ==
=== Regeneration ===
The Ollerton regeneration project 2023 plans to transform New Ollerton which aims to deliver a state-of-the-art library, boutique cinema and residential, retail and hospitality spaces from the levelling up funds from the UK Government. The plans have been put into place by Newark and Sherwood District Council.

Ollerton Hall which came into disrepair is now being renovated. Ollerton Hall was purchased by Newark and Sherwood District Council for renovation. The hall will now become 8 apartments.

=== Sherwood Energy Village ===
The colliery closed in 1994, losing around 1,000 jobs. A group of locals including past colliery workers had a vision to try to establish a new facility that would – at least – provide as many new jobs as were lost. A non-profit organisation run by 10 trustees was established to raise "...just under £50,000" to purchase the 125-acre colliery footprint from British Coal.

A further £4.25 million was needed to reclaim and clean up the land, which was redeveloped as an ecologically sustainable business park of commercial offices occupying 40-acres, named Sherwood Energy Village.

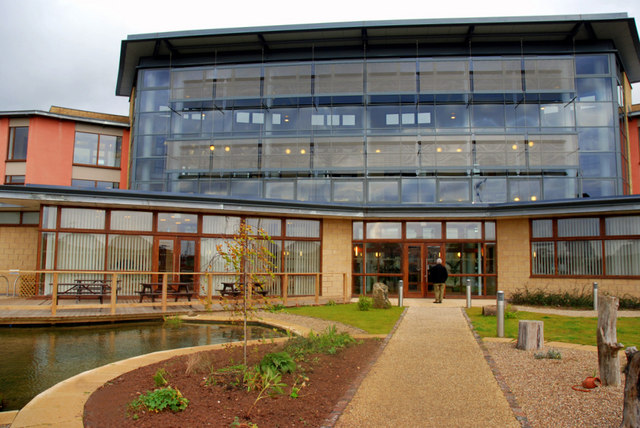
Sherwood Energy Village headquarters in 2006

Key-tenants, including Center Parcs and Nottinghamshire County Council, were responsible for creating their own buildings, with an emphasis on low-energy consumption by using advanced materials and technology including ground source heat pumps. Included into the layout was a nearby Tesco superstore.

The original development organisation failed in 2010 and went into administration, citing difficult trading conditions after the worldwide 2008 financial crisis, having created 500 more jobs than the original 1,000 target, and having been awarded the inaugural Enterprising Britain Award in 2005.

== Amenities ==
The town has a Tesco Superstore and a smaller Asda supermarket nearby.

The town also has a library.
