= Delivery drone =

Unmanned aerial vehicle (UAV) used to transport packages, food or other goods

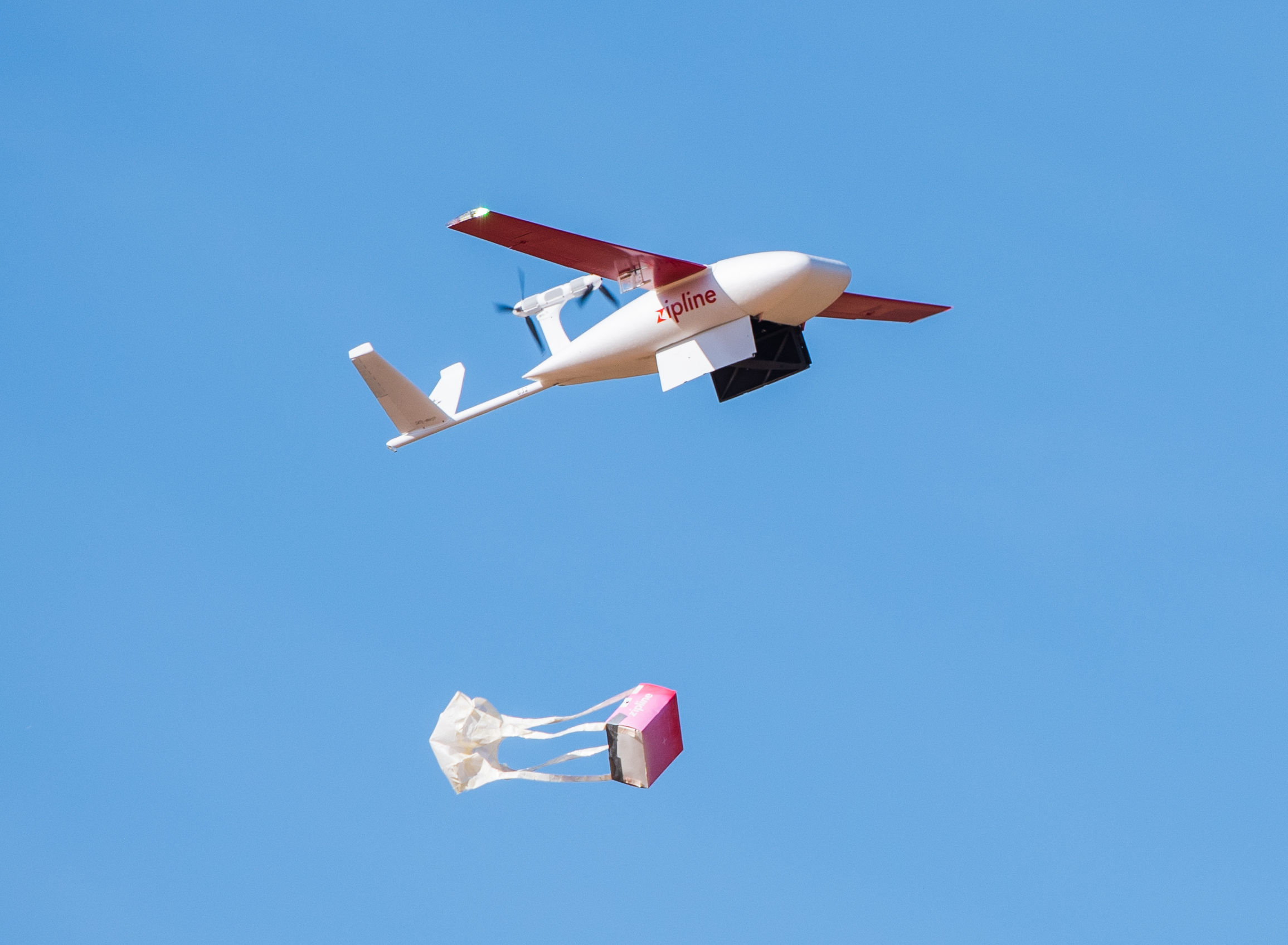
A Zipline drone designed for delivering medical supplies and blood.

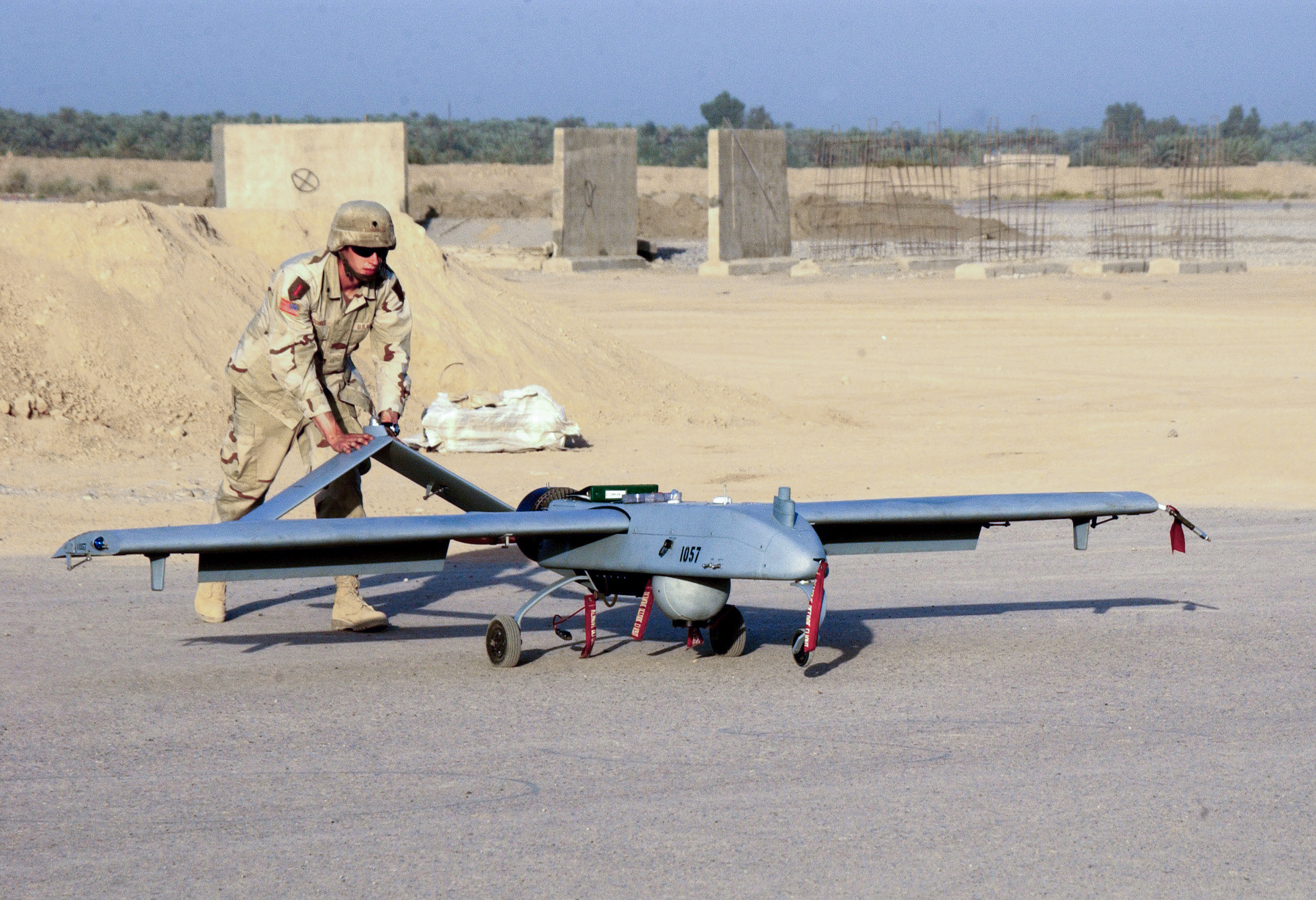
The RQ-7 Shadow is capable of delivering a 20 lb (9.1 kg) "Quick-MEDS" canister to front-line troops.

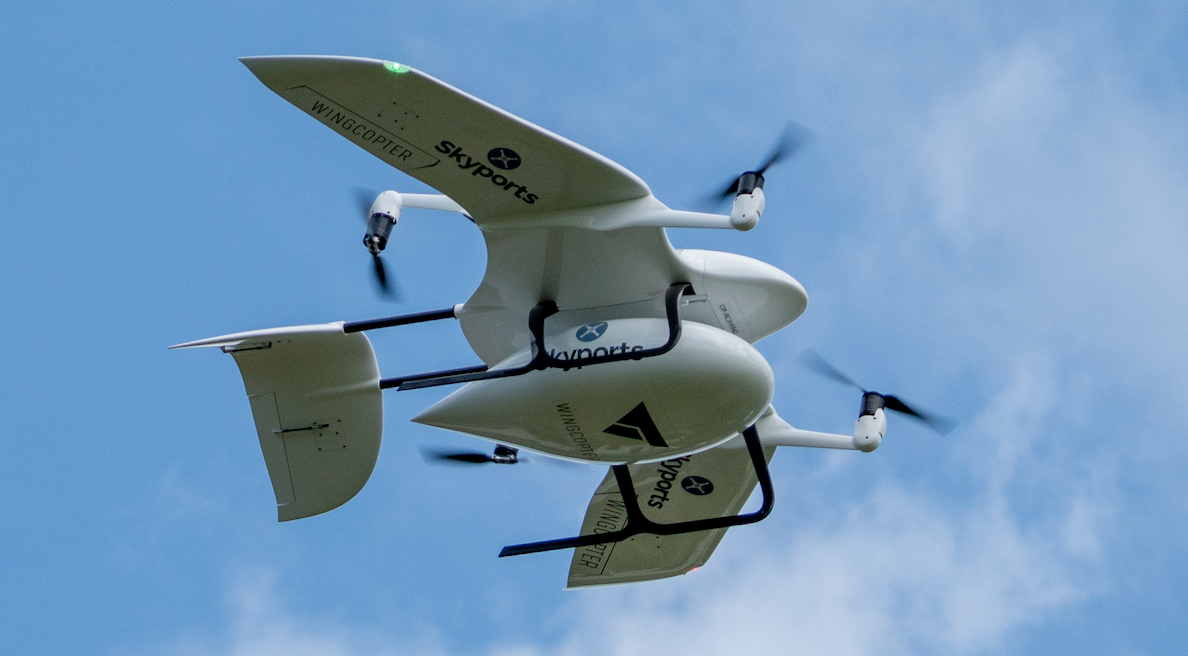
A Wingcopter drone delivering COVID-19 test kits in Scotland.

A delivery drone is an unmanned aerial vehicle (UAV) designed to transport items such as packages, medicines, food, postal mail, and other light goods. Large corporations such as Amazon, DHL, and FedEx have started to use drone delivery services.

The efficacy of drones in the context of the fight against COVID-19 is evidenced by their successful delivery of millions of vaccines and medical supplies worldwide. The use of drones in delivery services is characterized by its high efficiency, resulting in significant reductions in delivery times and the avoidance of problems typically encountered by traditional delivery vehicles. Medical supplies represent a particularly promising category of drone delivery due to their life-saving potential. This potential has led to the widespread testing of medical supplies in drone delivery systems. Numerous countries have conducted trials and pilot projects in this area, including Australia, Canada, Botswana, Ghana, Uganda, the UK, and the US.

Delivery drones can be autonomous, semi-autonomous, or remote-controlled. The most common types of drones are terrestrial and aerial, however, they can also be aquatic.

== Applications ==
=== Healthcare delivery ===
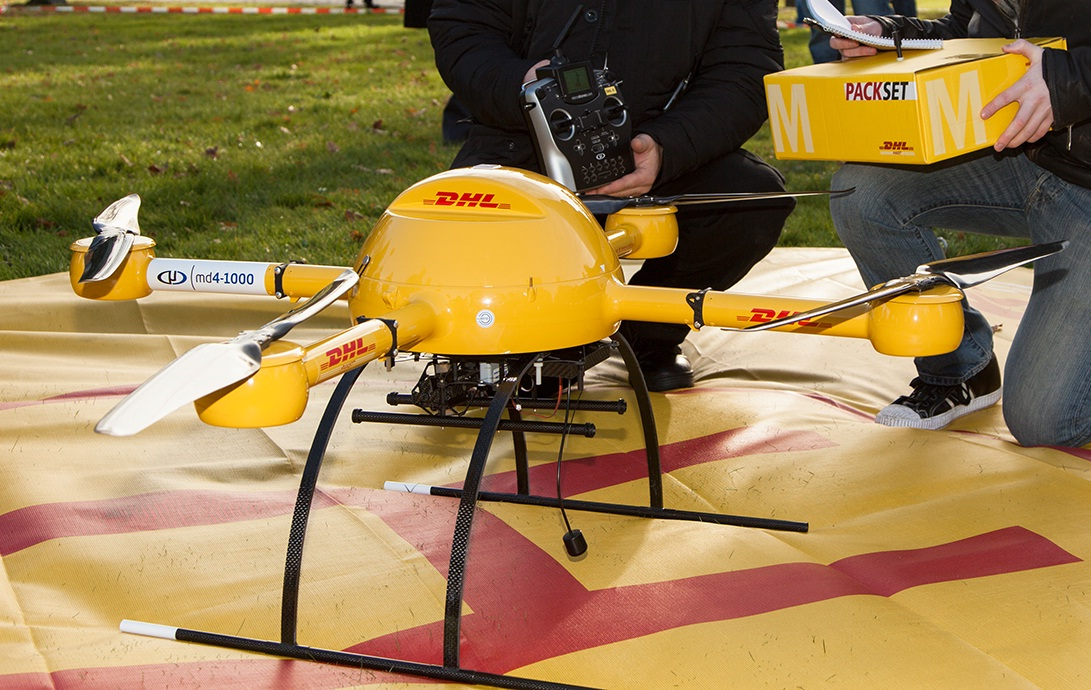
In December 2013, the DHL parcel service subsidiary of Deutsche Post AG tested a "microdrones md4-1000" for delivery of medicine.

Drones have served a role in transporting critical healthcare supplies such as blood, vaccines, pharmaceutical drugs, first aid equipment, and medical samples. Medical deliveries have the ability to navigate remote or otherwise inaccessible areas with a more rapid response time in emergencies compared to ambulances. Medical drone delivery is credited with saving lives during emergency deliveries of blood in Rwanda and post-hurricane relief in Puerto Rico. Emergency drone deliveries also played a significant role in responding to the earthquakes in Haiti and Taiwan and various natural disasters in Nepal. Time is crucial in emergency situations, especially when victims require prompt medical treatment.

During the COVID-19 pandemic, drones made medical deliveries of personal protective equipment and COVID-19 tests in the United States, Israel, and Ghana. In partnership with the Ghana Ministry of Health, Zipline drones delivered thousands of COVID-19 vaccine vials in Ghana during 2020 and 2021. The University of British Columbia (UBC) has selected Drone Delivery Canada Corp for UBC's "Remote Communities Drone Transport Initiative" program. This solution will be used to transport a variety of cargo for the benefit of the Stellat'en First Nation, located in the Fraser Lake area of Central Northern British Columbia.

Irish drone-delivery startup Manna was ready to start deliveries as the COVID-19 pandemic started in March 2020. The company quickly restructured to start making essential deliveries of prescription medication and food to isolated residents in the village of Moneygall. Ireland's national health service, the HSE, designated Manna an essential service, and it took the company a week to pivot from the original plan of food delivery to delivering essential medical goods. Meanwhile, UK-based autonomous drone operator Windracers completed its first successful unmanned aerial vehicle (UAV) flight in December 2020, taking medical supplies from Cornwall to the Isles of Scilly.

In 2021, Skyports drones began a 3-month project, which later evolved into a trial, successfully carrying COVID-19 samples and test kits from Mull, Clachan-Seil and Lochgilphead to Lorn and Islands Hospital in Oban, marking a significant milestone in the UK, being known as the first of their kind.

In August 2022, St Mary's Hospital on the Isle of Wight was selected to participate in a pilot scheme for receiving medicine delivered by delivery drones, with the shipments being flown in from the Portsmouth Hospitals University NHS Trust's pharmacy on the mainland.

=== Food delivery ===
Drones have been proposed as a solution for rapidly delivering prepared foods, such as pizzas, tacos, and frozen beverages. Drone delivery is a new way of delivering products to consumers. Rather than focusing on traditional delivery methods — people delivering via car, bicycle, or truck — this form of delivery gives the responsibility to a drone. Drones move through the sky, allowing them to bypass urban sprawl with the least amount of human intervention.

Foodpanda has piloted food deliveries in Singapore using multirotor drones from ST Engineering and in Pakistan using VTOL drones. Early prototypes of food delivery drones include the Tacocopter demonstration by Star Simpson, which was a taco delivery concept utilizing a smartphone app to order drone-delivered tacos in the San Francisco area. The revelation that it did not exist as a delivery system or app led to it being labelled a hoax. A similar concept named the "burrito bomber" was tested in 2012.

=== Postal delivery ===
Different postal companies from Australia, Switzerland, Germany, Singapore, and the United Kingdom have undertaken various drone trials as they test the feasibility and profitability of unmanned delivery drone services. The USPS has been testing delivery systems with the potential to integrate them into its mailing services. The postal service seeks to gather information from UAS operators and developers to possibly provide them with the necessary equipment and aircraft.

In 2021 Windracers' drones were used to deliver post between Kirkwall and North Ronaldsay in Scotland's Orkney Islands in a two-week trial carried out by Royal Mail to help better connect remote island communities and reduce carbon emissions. The usage of drones could result in decreased delivery times, as current methods of delivery by ferry are commonly affected by weather.

The Greek postal service ELTA has made an agreement with drone cargo company Dronamics for the use of drones for postage. The desired goal of this agreement is same-day delivery for all users as well as making postal services more accessible and at a lower price point for Greece.

In the United Kingdom, the Royal Mail has earmarked a plan for a fleet of 500 drones to deliver post and parcels to remote communities.

=== Retail delivery ===
Google, Amazon, 7-Eleven, and Walmart have conducted trials using drones to deliver merchandise. Google is operating on a test basis in Australia, while Amazon, Walmart, and 7-Eleven have been piloting drone delivery programs in the United States. Such applications are expected to help decrease the environmental impact of the merchandise industry. Research shows that using drones for small package deliveries can significantly reduce carbon emissions compared to traditional delivery trucks. A study by Lawrence Livermore National Laboratory highlighted that drone delivery of a small package could result in about 0.42 kg of greenhouse gas emissions per package in California, a 54% reduction compared to truck deliveries, which emit about 1 kg of greenhouse gases per package.

The improvement varies by region due to the carbon intensity of local electricity grids used to charge the drones. The study states that Missouri is an example of a state where the electricity grid is not quite as efficient as California's electricity grid. As for efficiency and resiliency, drone deliveries improve supply chain resiliency. Drones have been used effectively to maintain supply chains and limit physical contact, as seen during COVID-19. Drones are able to deliver medical supplies and other essential goods. In Virginia, for example, drone deliveries were found to potentially reduce annual road use by up to 294 million miles and significantly decrease carbon emissions.

Drone delivery provides a solution for inventory management in retail. By leveraging drones for frequent, small-scale deliveries, retailers can minimize their reliance on large shipments from distribution centers. This shift allows retailers to maintain optimal inventory levels, effectively reducing storage costs and the risks associated with overstocking or stockouts. Additionally, drones enable swift restocking of inventory at retail outlets, ensuring a consistent availability of products for customers.

=== Ship resupply ===
The shipping line Maersk and the Port of Rotterdam have experimented with using drones to resupply offshore ships instead of sending smaller boats.

In the realm of maritime logistics, the integration of unmanned aerial systems (UAS), particularly automated vertical takeoff and landing (VTOL) drones, presents a transformative opportunity. These drones offer several advantages, including cost savings, operational efficiency, and environmental sustainability. Cost savings are a significant benefit, as fleets of less expensive VTOL UAS aircraft for maritime resupply can markedly reduce costs for commercial shipping and energy companies. Furthermore, operational efficiency is enhanced, with drones minimizing downtime and ensuring swift deliveries to offshore locations. From an environmental standpoint, VTOL UAS aircraft operate on electricity, producing zero emissions, thereby offering a cleaner and more sustainable alternative to traditional delivery methods.

Skyports Drone Services has partnered with Thome Group and Wilhelmsen Ships Agency so that they can begin using drones as a method of transportation. Skyports Drone Services brings their advancements in the Advanced Air Mobility (AAM) industry to decrease delivery times and environmental damages in the Maritime supply chain around Singapore.

=== Military resupply ===
United States Army 101st Airborne Division training with TRV-150 drone

The Marine Corps has been looking into using TRUAS drones, or Tactical Resupply Unmanned Aircraft Systems for basic military resupply. The drones will be able to provide a much faster resupply in more dangerous areas compared to traditional methods. The TRAUS drones planned for use by the Marine Corps will fly automatically to the programmed destination with the ability to transport 150 pounds over a range of 9 miles.

The Naval Air Warfare Center Aircraft Division (NAWCAD) has been instrumental in developing the Blue Water Maritime Logistics UAS, a drone designed for long-range naval ship-to-ship and ship-to-shore cargo transport. This drone is made to meet specific military requirements, including the ability to operate in challenging environments like open waters and heavy winds. It can carry essential cargo and spare parts up to 20 pounds to distances of about 25 miles without needing to refuel. In the future, the Navy plans to integrate these drone capabilities more fully into fleet operations. This integration includes testing and refining the drones' capabilities through further trials and demonstrations in varied scenarios. The goal is to solidify the role of drones in enhancing the logistical support of naval operations while ensuring the safety and efficiency of these systems.

On April 11, 2023, the U.S. Department of Defense announced that it was going to contribute 8 million dollars for 21 new delivery drones. These new drones are called the TRV-150C. The TRV-150C can deliver food, water, ammunition, weapons, and medical supplies. An additional benefit to the TRV-150C is its small size which allows only one person to carry the UAV in a special carrying case. The TRV-150C is still under production and should be finished by 2025.

The British Royal Navy began testing Windracers' fixed-wing autonomous drone in 2022. In September 2023, Windracers' self-flying aircraft landed on a Royal Navy carrier at sea as a trial for moving supplies between ships without the need to launch traditional helicopters. In May 2024, Windracers revealed that it has been conducting intelligence, surveillance, and reconnaissance (ISR) and supporting resupply for the Armed Forces of Ukraine since 2023.

=== Agriculture ===
The prospects of delivery drone technology in farming were initially realized in Japan in 1986 to address rice shortages.

Originally, drones entered the agriculture scene for non-spraying applications. This included crop and field-condition data collection to increase profitability within crop production.

Delivery drones have multiple applications in the agriculture sector today. Uses include monitoring irrigation equipment, soil health, pest control, fertilizer spraying, and livestock harvesting. Drones capture valuable information, which includes soil characteristics, location of drainage tiles, crop nutrient stress levels, crop emergence or stand count, weed species and infestation level, and detection of insects and diseases.

The benefits of drones in agriculture for increasing crop yields, cutting costs, and enhancing efficiency are especially being recognized considering the growing challenges to farming posed by climate change. Although regulations and usage vary, the United States, China, France, Germany, Australia, and New Zealand are among the countries increasingly and successfully incorporating UAVs into their farming infrastructure. Regulatory and financial obstacles are attributed as reasons for limited agricultural drone use in Africa and South American regions.

Today, geographical information systems and specialized software are used in addition to tractors or combines on the ground. There have been programs made to guide drones as they fly over the field. Drones are used in a variety of ways that benefit agricultural growth. Drones can be programmed to detect variations in plant numbers, health, height and other statistics. Drones are also used to apply pesticides to certain crop areas that need it.

== Regulation ==
In February 2014, the prime minister and cabinet affairs minister of the United Arab Emirates (UAE) announced that the UAE planned to launch a fleet of UAVs for civilian purposes. Plans were for the UAVs to use fingerprint and eye-recognition systems to deliver official documents such as passports, ID cards, and licenses, and supply emergency services at accidents. A battery-powered prototype four-rotor UAV about half a meter across was displayed in Dubai.

In the United States, initial attempts at commercial use of UAVs were blocked by FAA regulation but were later allowed. In June 2014, the FAA published a document that listed activities not permitted under its regulations, including commercial use, which the organization stated included "delivering packages to people for a fee" or offered as part of a "purchase or another offer." The agency issued waivers to many organizations for less restrictive commercial uses, but each had to apply individually. In August 2016, the FAA adopted Part 107 rules that allowed limited commercial use by right. Drone operation under these rules is restricted to line-of-sight of the pilot and is not allowed over people, implying many applications, like delivery to populated areas, still requires a waiver. They also require the UAVs weigh less than 55 lb (25 kg), fly up to a maximum of 400 feet (120 m), at a speed of no greater than 100 miles per hour (160 km/h), only be operated during daytime, and that drone operators must also qualify for flying certificates and be at least 16 years old.

In 2019, the FAA began certifying drone delivery companies under conventional charter airline Part 135 rules, with some accommodations for drones (such as that the pilot manual did not need to be carried on board). In preparation for higher volumes of drone traffic, the FAA finalized the Remote ID regulation in December 2020, giving manufacturers 18 months and operators 30 months to comply with the requirement for self-identification transmissions outside of designated areas. At the same time, the FAA added an Operations Over People and at Night rule to Part 107. Nighttime operations require anti-collision lights and additional pilot training. For flight over people or moving vehicles, drones are put into four categories depending on the capability of injury to people, with the least restricted category having a full Part 21 airworthiness certificate.

In the European Union, delivery-drone operations are generally governed by Commission Implementing Regulation (EU) 2019/947, which uses a risk-based framework (open, specific, and certified categories). Operations that go beyond low-risk limits (for example, routine flights in built-up areas that require beyond visual line of sight (BVLOS) or higher kinetic energy) typically fall under the specific category and may require an operational authorisation supported by a documented risk assessment, such as the Specific Operations Risk Assessment (SORA) methodology referenced by regulators and industry guidance.

Privacy and data-protection law can also affect deployments, because delivery drones may use cameras and other sensors for navigation and obstacle avoidance that can capture personal data. In the European Union, such processing must comply with the General Data Protection Regulation (GDPR), including having a lawful basis and meeting principles such as purpose limitation and data minimisation. The European Data Protection Board (EDPB) has issued guidance on applying the GDPR to processing via video devices, which is relevant where drone operations involve video capture in public spaces. Earlier EU regulator guidance on drones also highlighted risks such as lack of transparency and potential surveillance effects from onboard sensors.

== Early experiments ==
The concept of drone delivery entered the mainstream with Amazon Prime Air – Amazon.com founder Jeff Bezos' December 2013 announcement that Amazon was planning rapid delivery of lightweight commercial products using UAVs. Amazon's press release was met with skepticism, with perceived hurdles including federal and state regulatory approval, public safety, reliability, individual privacy, operator training and certification, security (hacking), payload thievery, and logistical challenges.

In December 2013, in a research project of Deutsche Post AG subsidiary DHL, a sub-kilogram quantity of medicine was delivered via a prototype Microdrones "Parcelcopter", raising speculation that disaster relief may be the first industry the company will use the technology.

In August 2014, Google revealed it had been testing UAVs in Australia for two years. The Google X program known as "Project Wing" announced an aim to produce drones that can deliver products sold via e-commerce.

In February 2015, Hangzhou-based e-commerce provider Ali Baba started delivery drone service in a partnership with Shanghai YTO Express in which it delivered tea to 450 customers around select cities in China

In 2015, an Israeli startup Flytrex partnered with AHA, Iceland's largest eCommerce website, and together they initiated a drone delivery route which demonstrated reducing delivery time from 30 minutes, to less than 5 minutes.

In March 2016, Flirtey conducted the first fully autonomous FAA approved drone delivery in an urban setting in the U.S.

A partnership between 7-Eleven and Flirtey resulted in the first FAA-approved delivery to a residence in the United States in July 2016, delivering a frozen Slurpee. The following month, the company partnered with Domino's in New Zealand to launch the first commercial drone delivery service.

In China, JD.com has been developing drone delivery capabilities. As of June 2017, JD.com had seven different types of delivery drones in testing across four provinces in China (Beijing, Sichuan, Shaanxi and Jiangsu). The drones are capable of delivering packages weighing between 5 and 30 kg (11 to 66 lb) while flying up to 100 km/h (62 mph). The drones fly along fixed routes from warehouses to special landing pads where one of JD.com's 300,000 local contractors then delivers the packages to the customers' doorsteps in the rural villages. The e-commerce giant is also working on a 1 metric ton (1,000 kg) delivery drone which will be tested in Shaanxi.

In January 2018, Boeing unveiled a prototype of a cargo drone for up to 500 lb (227 kg) payloads, an electric flying testbed that completed flight tests at the Boeing Research & Technology research center in Missouri.

== Research ==
Drone technology is continuing to advance with the different efforts of scientific research being held. The global commercial drone market was valued at about $8 billion in 2022 and is projected to hit $47 billion by 2030. Drone improvements include advances in autonomous flight, composite materials, next-generation batteries, extended flight times, and payload capacities. As technology further advances, drones will be integrated with artificial intelligence and machine learning. The future of drone delivery is promising in different applications of drone delivery.

== Environmental Impact ==
Delivery drones have a complex environmental profile that varies with use case, technology and local conditions. Some studies suggest that electric delivery drones can reduce greenhouse gas emissions and energy use compared with conventional delivery vehicles for light packages over short distances, but the scale of these benefits depends on factors such as payload weight, flight range and the carbon intensity of the electricity used to charge batteries. Life-cycle assessments indicate that accounting for manufacturing, battery production and end-of-life processes can reduce or negate some of these advantages.

Regulatory assessments have also highlighted concerns about noise pollution, potential disturbance to wildlife and the uncertainties over long-term environmental gains, noting that comprehensive life-cycle and ecosystem impact studies are needed to guide policy and deployment. In response, agencies such as the European Union Aviation Safety Agency are developing standardised environmental footprint methodologies to assess impacts across a drones life cycle.

== Illegal deliveries ==
Drug cartels have used UAVs to transport contraband, sometimes using GPS-guided UAVs. Drones have also been used to transport and deliver contraband into prisons.

From 2013 and 2015, UAVs were observed delivering items into prisons on at least four occasions in the United States while four separate but similar incidents occurred in Ireland, Britain, Australia and Canada as well. Though not a popular way of smuggling items into prisons, corrections officials state that some individuals are beginning to experiment with UAVs.

In November 2013, four people in Morgan, Georgia, were arrested for allegedly attempting to smuggle contraband into Calhoun State Prison with a hexacopter.

In June 2014, a quadcopter crashed into an exercise yard of Wheatfield Prison, Dublin. The quadcopter collided with wires designed to prevent helicopters landing to aid escapes, causing it to crash. A package containing drugs hung from the quadcopter and was seized by prisoners before prison staff could get to it.

Between 2014 and 2015, at two prisons in South Carolina, items such as drugs and cell phones were flown into the area by UAVs with authorities and one prison was unaware of how many deliveries were successfully being brought into the facility before gaining the attention of authorities.

In January 2025, the Chief Inspector of Prisons in the United Kingdom claimed that drug gangs flying drones in airspace above prisons was a national security threat.

In addition to physical sites, urban delivery-drone systems rely on digital infrastructure for tracking, communication and operational control. Survey work on UAV cellular communications has described mobile networks as a key enabling technology for unmanned aircraft connectivity, including command-and-control links and data exchange needed for reliable operations in complex environments.

Coordination services for low-altitude traffic have also been discussed as a scaling mechanism where multiple operators share the same airspace. NASA’s UAS Traffic Management (UTM) BVLOS work describes operational evaluations that support commercial package-delivery flights and data-sharing between operators to maintain situational awareness and reduce conflict risk in busy areas.

== See also ==
- Unmanned aerial vehicle
- Automated storage and retrieval system
- Delivery robot
- Agricultural drone
