= Wing Aviation =

Alphabet subsidiary for drone delivery systems

Wing Aviation LLC
- Trade name: Wing
- Type: Subsidiary
- Industry: Aviation; logistics
- Founded: 2012; 14 years ago (as a project of X Development); July 2018; 8 years ago (as Wing)
- Headquarters: Mountain View, California, U.S.
- Number of locations: 5
- Area served: United States; Australia; Finland; Ireland
- Key people: Adam Woodworth (CEO)
- Services: Drone delivery
- Parent: Alphabet Inc.
- Website: wing.com

Wing Aviation LLC, doing business as Wing, is a subsidiary of Alphabet Inc. that develops a drone delivery system and UTM systems. The company completed its first deliveries in 2014. The company has operations in Australia, the United States, Finland, and Ireland, with potential expansion to the United Kingdom planned. In July 2018, Project Wing graduated from X Development (formally Google X) to become an independent Alphabet company. As of January 2019, Wing began delivering take-out food and beverages out of its test facility in Bonython, Australia, as part of a pilot program. In April 2019 Wing became the first drone delivery company to receive an air operator's certificate from the Federal Aviation Administration to allow it to operate as an airline in the US. As of June 2026, Wing has completed more than 1 million commercial deliveries, mainly through its partnership with Walmart.

== Drone specification ==
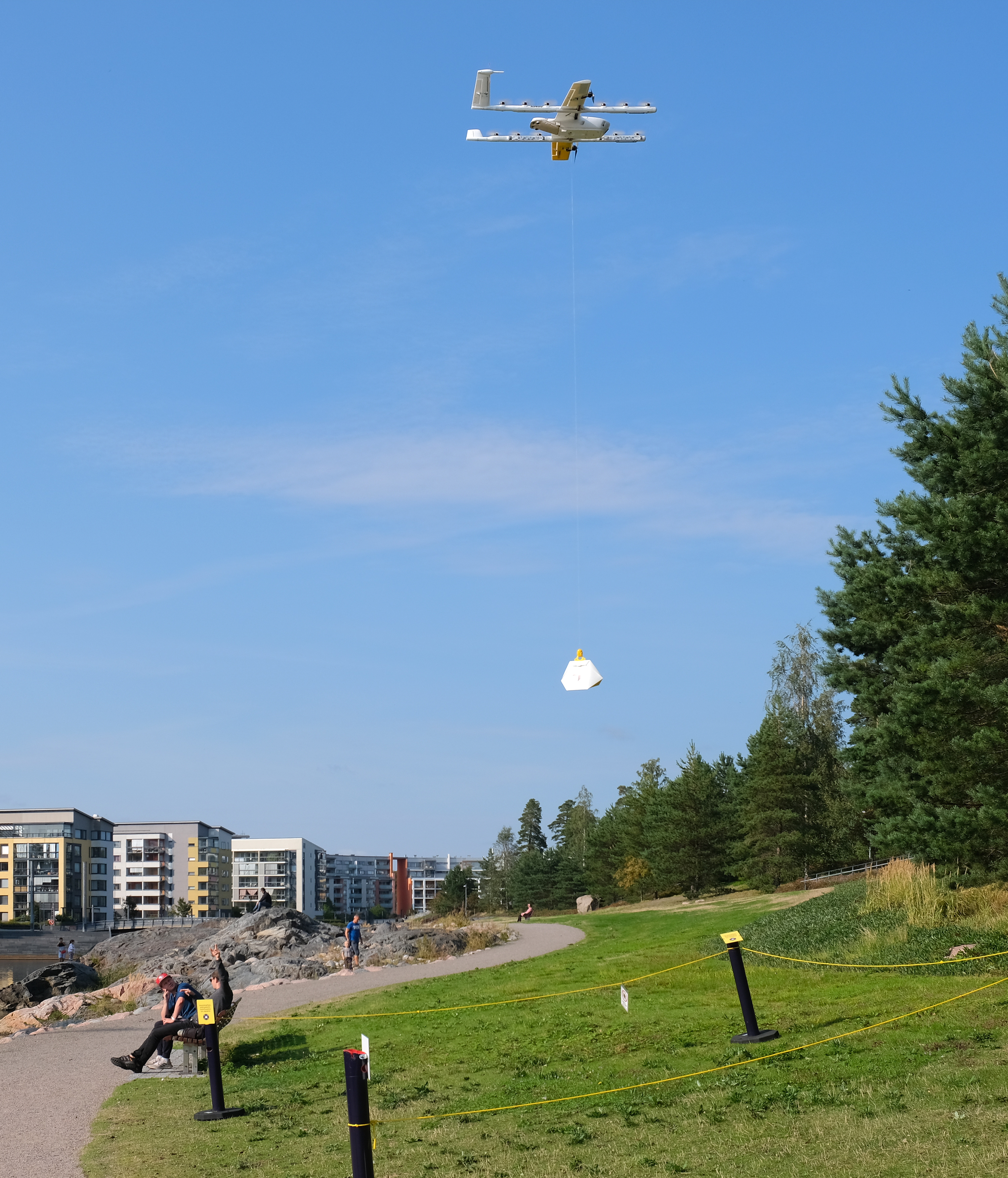
Wing's aircraft delivering goods in Vuosaari, Helsinki

In the six years to 2018, Wing developed its aircraft to meet compliance standards and effectively deliver parcels through the air. The drones are specifically designed for small parcel delivery. Each aircraft has horizontally-oriented propellers like a classic multirotor drone, along with a fixed-wing to help it cover long distances quickly The aircraft takes off vertically and then enters a forward-flight phase. Its motors are powered by electric batteries. For safety purposes, the aircraft features many redundant systems (extra propellers, batteries, etc.) so that if anything were to malfunction, flight can continue until a mechanic can address the issue. The flight path the aircraft follows is determined by Wing's UTM (Unmanned Traffic Management) System, which optimizes the route for time and distance efficiency while ensuring the plane's path will be obstacle-free. To assist in navigating unforeseen obstacles, the aircraft is equipped with black and white cameras that detect and analyze shapes without observing distinct features in order to preserve community privacy while maintaining safe flight. The company says that image data is not preserved, and is only used for ‘technical analysis’.

In 2022, the company introduced concepts for new models that could carry larger and smaller payloads.

== Objections and opposition ==
Wing's public operations have faced noise complaints. Residents in the rural southeastern region of Australia where Wing operates have complained about the disruption to their lives. A local dog club president said that the noise from the delivery drone trials spooked dogs when nearby. Some customers opted out of the trial citing this disruption. One ecologist states they worry these "drones are taking to the air without a lot of thought for the ears of people on the ground." In November 2019, the Australian Federal government found Wing's Canberra operation exceeded the residential noise standard. Wing developed a quieter propeller and promised other measures to address this issue.

In an experiment in Bonython, a suburb of Canberra, drones suddenly appeared, surprising and annoying residents. There were complaints about the drones' impact on the community, local wildlife and the environment. There were unplanned landings, dropped payloads, drones flying close to vehicle traffic, and birds attacking and forcing down some drones. Residents joined together, using Facebook and a Web site, produced newsletters, lobbied federal and local MPs, informed local, national and international news media, and made many freedom of information requests to local authorities.

In response to complaints a parliamentary inquiry into drone delivery systems was set up, with remit including examination of the decision to permit the trials, the economic impact of the technology, what regulatory oversight there was of the technology at various levels of government, and possible environmental impact of drone deliveries. In August 2023 Wing terminated operations in the Canberra area with little fanfare, because it had "shifted [its] operating model".
