= Star Simpson =

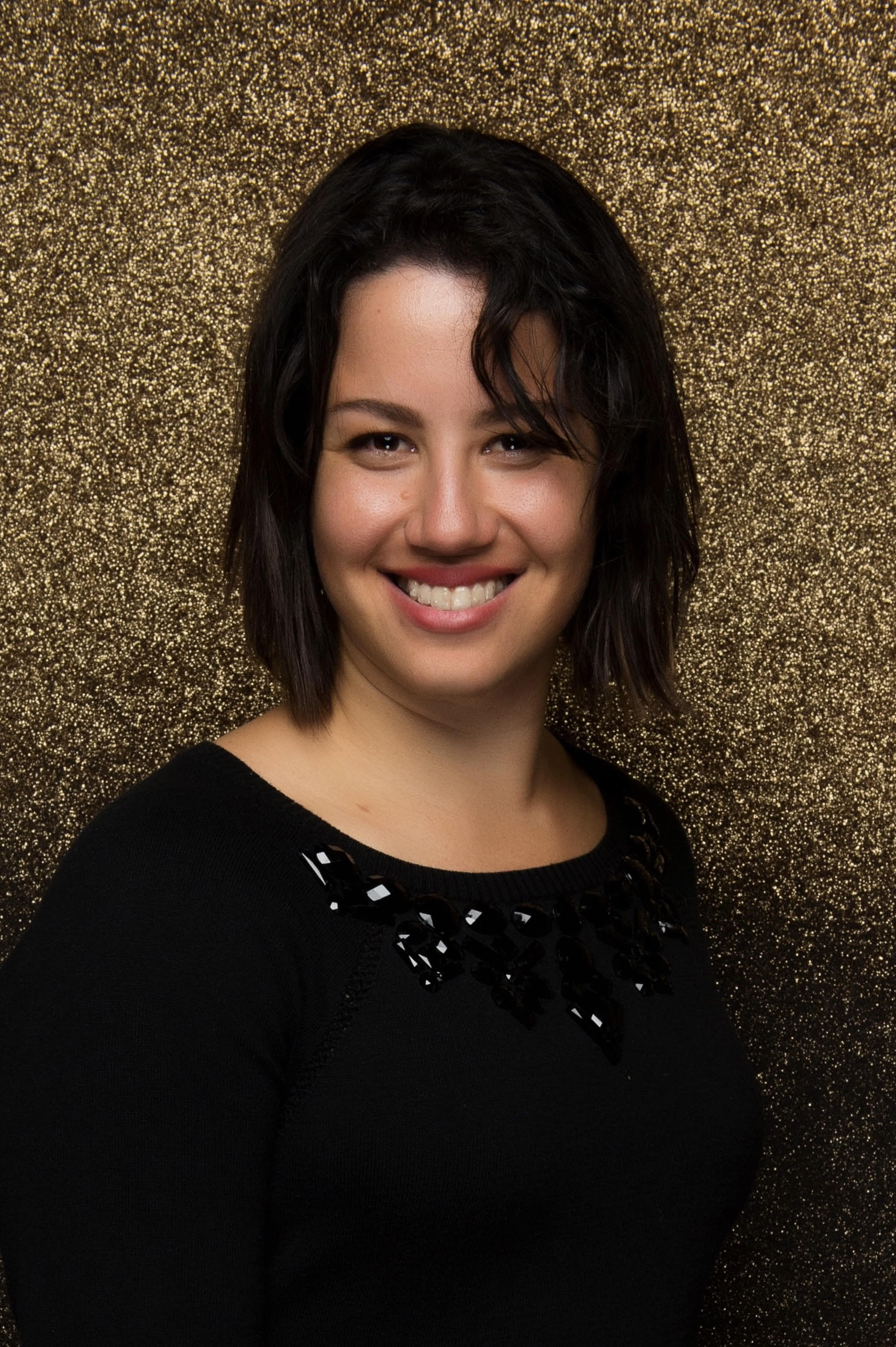
- Star Simpson in 2017
- Born: Hawaii
- Occupation: Engineer
- Known for: Engineering and Design
- Notable work: Circuit Classics, Tacocopter
- Website: starsimpson.com

Star Simpson is an American maker, inventor, and serial entrepreneur based in Los Angeles. She is responsible for a number of high-profile projects with drone design and applications, including developing autonomous aircraft for DARPA at Otherlab, a Research & Development lab in San Francisco.

== Early life ==
Simpson was born and raised in Hawaii, where her parents owned a jewelry business. She was drawn to technology at an early age.

Simpson first heard about MIT when she was eight years old. In high school, she was involved in projects that helped develop her technical skills. She contributed to building one of the world's largest Wi-Fi networks and worked with what was at that time an emerging software with the Hawaiian name of "wiki".

== Education and Life at MIT ==
Shortly after arriving on the MIT campus, she met a student group called MITERS (the MIT Electronic Research Society).

In September 2007 while a student at MIT, several months after the Boston Mooninite Panic, Simpson created an electronic fashion sweatshirt featuring a colored, glowing name tag. While wearing this sweatshirt during a visit to Boston Logan Airport, Simpson was arrested at gunpoint and charged with the possession of a hoax device, a charge that was dropped by prosecutors a year later. In an echo of MIT's official later treatment of Aaron Swartz, the MIT media office released a statement condemning and disavowing Simpson's actions before she was even released from questioning.

Simpson studied at MIT between 2006 and 2010. She returned to MIT in 2015 to speak about her experience at an MIT conference on the Freedom to Innovate.

In 2017, MIT established a "disobedience" award to reward forms of disobedience that benefit society, as demonstrated by Simpson while a student at MIT.

== Career ==
Simpson's stealth project TacoCopter was the first drone delivery project to receive widespread media attention in March 2012, more than year before Amazon and Google X's announcement of similar concepts.

Star Simpson served on the Open Source Hardware Association board as a member in 2013–2014.

In 2013, Simpson founded PLIBMTTBHGATY, or Programming Languages I've Been Meaning To Try But Haven't Gotten Around To Yet. PLIBMTTBHGATY is a social and networking event for people to learn new programming languages.

In 2016, Simpson launched Circuit Classics, reviving Forrest M. Mims III's hand drawn "Getting Started in Electronics" projects as hardware kits. Circuit Classics are printed circuit boards designed to help educate people on the basics of circuit design.

Simpson developed the APSARA from Hindi Apsara (Aerial Platform Supporting Autonomous Resupply Actions) while at Otherlab, a San Francisco Engineering R&D firm. The APSARA drone is a cardboard glider that can carry up to two pounds of cargo. Simpson's team designed and built APSARA with funding from DARPA, in response to a desire for a single-use delivery vehicle for emergency scenarios. Uniquely, the drones had to not only carry a small package and land precisely, they had to disappear completely once on the ground.

In 2017, Simpson co-founded Project Alloy along with Ian Michael Smith, a non-profit that subsidizes conference attendance for under-represented minorities in tech.

Star Simpson is the co-founder of a UAS-focused startup.

In 2018, Simpson served as a source in a New York Times investigation of Richard DeVaul, a director at Google X who resigned after a series of articles that detailed sexual harassment allegations against him and other executives at the company. Approximately 20,000 Google employees in the 2018 Google walkouts organized in support of Simpson and others.

In 2020, Simpson's drone-delivery startup ThereCraft came out of stealth mode. ThereCraft's drones distinguish themselves by utilizing a lifting body design.

Star Simpson is also a private glider pilot.

== Public Appearances ==
- 2015: MIT: Freedom to Innovate
- 2015: Giant Robots Smashing Into Other Giant Robots Podcast with Star Simpson
- 2016: TEDxBoulder: Late Night Taco Delivery by Drone (The Future?)
- 2016: Circuit Classics – XOXO Festival
- 2016: Hackaday Superconference
- 2018: Maui Makers TalkStory Quotes
