= Zipline (drone delivery company) =

Company that delivers medical supplies by drone

Zipline International Inc.

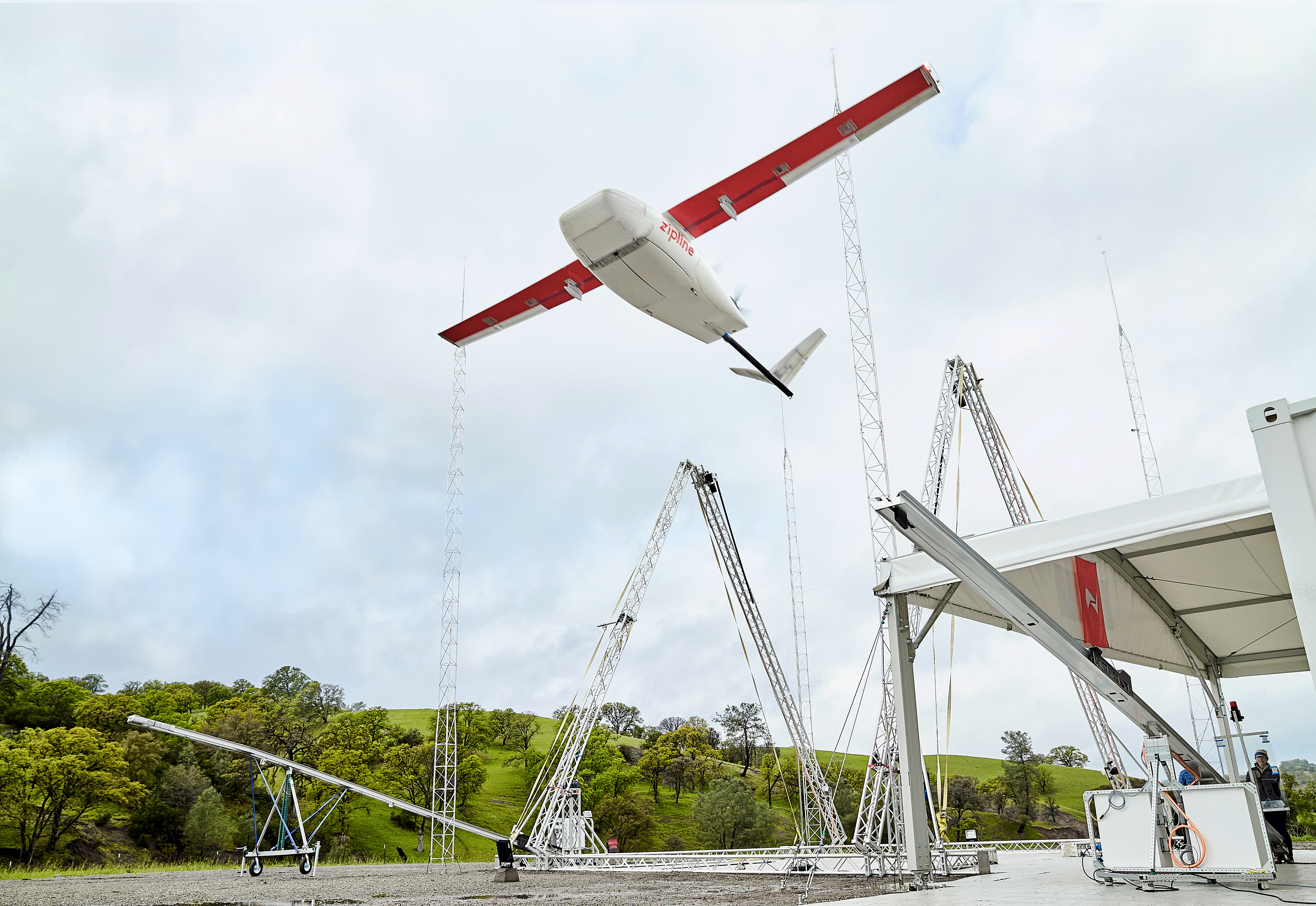
- Type: Private
- Industry: Logistics
- Genre: Delivery drone
- Founded: March 2014; 12 years ago in Half Moon Bay, California, U.S.
- Founders: Keller Rinaudo Cliffton; Keenan Wyrobek; Ryan Oksenhorn; William Hetzler
- Headquarters: South San Francisco, California, U.S.
- Area served: Rwanda, Ghana, Japan, United States, Kenya, Côte d'Ivoire, Nigeria
- Key people: Keller Rinaudo Cliffton (CEO)
- Number of employees: 500-1000
- Website: www.zipline.com

Zipline International Inc. is an American company that designs, manufactures, and operates delivery drones, with distribution centers in the United States, Rwanda, Ghana, Japan, Nigeria, Côte d'Ivoire, and Kenya. As of January 2026, Zipline's drones have completed more than two million commercial deliveries and flown over 120 million miles.

Zipline has two different drone platforms, P1 is used for deliveries to rural areas and P2 in urban and suburban areas. All Zipline drones navigate and avoid obstacles autonomously using custom software the company developed, which run on Nvidia chips. The Zipline fleet is one of the world’s largest commercial deployments of autonomous robots.

== History ==
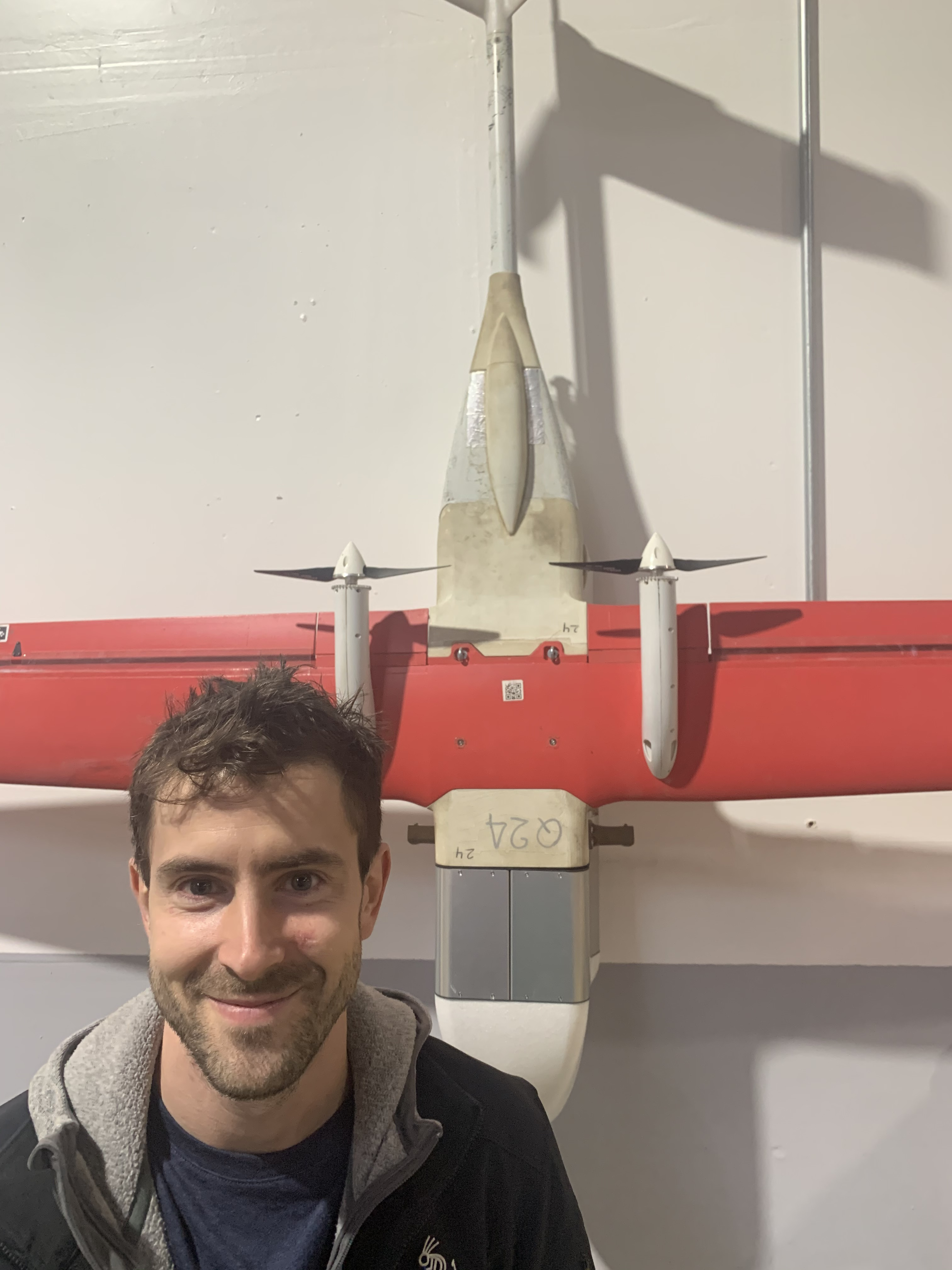
Zipline founder Keller Rinaudo beside the first-generation drone

External videos
- https://www.youtube.com/watch?v=DOWDNBu9DkU

Zipline originated from Romotive, a company founded in 2011 by Keller Rinaudo Cliffton that produced an iPhone-controlled robot. Romotive ceased operations in 2014, after which Rinaudo, Ryan Oksenhorn, William Hetzler, and Keenan Wyrobek began developing a fixed-wing drone platform intended for medical delivery. This effort became the basis for Zipline.

The company began operations in Rwanda in October 2016 following a government agreement to deliver blood and medical supplies to rural clinics from a centralized distribution center. A second Rwandan center opened in 2018 as the scope of deliveries expanded to include routine vaccines and essential medicines.

Zipline launched operations in Ghana on April 24, 2019 under a government contract that provided drone delivery services to public-sector health facilities. The program later expanded to multiple distribution centers serving additional regions.

Beginning in 2020, the company participated in regulatory programs, including the FAA type-certification process for delivery drones in the United States. It also deployed temperature-controlled payload systems to support delivery of vaccines requiring cold-chain conditions, including during COVID-19 vaccination campaigns in parts of Africa.

From 2022 onward, Zipline initiated operations outside Africa, including a partner-operated distribution center in Japan and limited pilot projects in the United States. It also introduced a new platform aimed at home deliveries in denser urban and suburban environments.

By the mid-2020s, Zipline had become an example of a Silicon Valley startup whose most visible commercial activity occurred abroad rather than domestically, with most of its business based on government contracts for transporting medical supplies to remote or hard-to-reach areas in multiple African countries.

In April 2024, Zipline completed its millionth commercial delivery, having flown more than 70 million autonomous commercial miles.

In January 2026, Zipline completed its two millionth commercial delivery, with over 120 million autonomous miles flown.

== Platform 1 ==
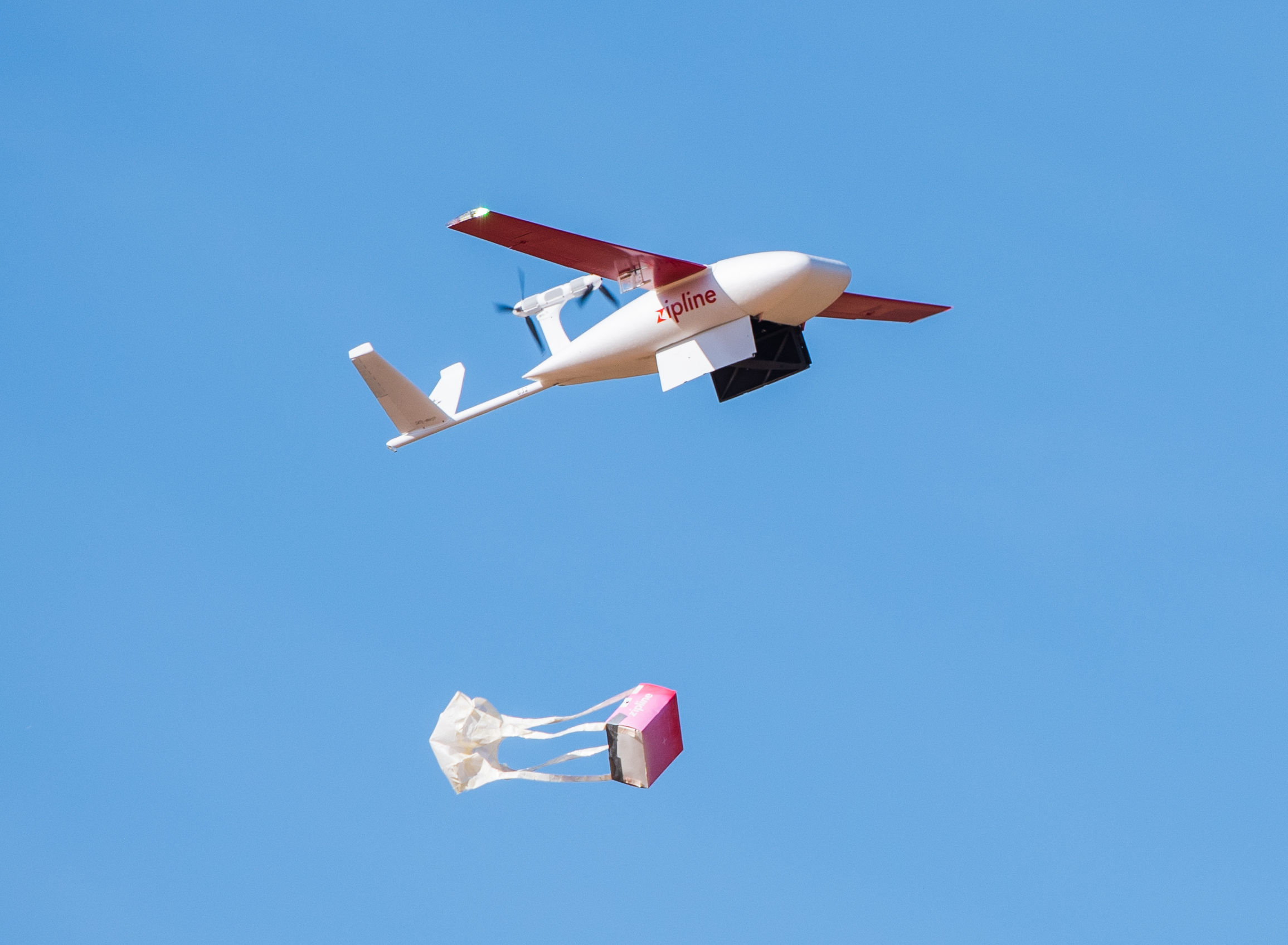
A Platform 1 drone dropping a parachute-equipped package

The Platform 1 model is a "forward flight lift only" fixed-wing drone weighing 44 pounds (20 kg) and can carry up to 4 pounds (1.8 kg) of cargo. While they can fly 300 km (190 mi) on a charge, they limit themselves to destinations within 80 km (50 mi). The drones have a quickly-replaceable battery that allows rapid turnaround between flights. It has an inner carbon-fiber frame and an outer polystyrene shell. The wingspan is 11 feet (3.4 m).

The drones have two propellers for redundancy and can fly safely on a single propeller or motor. A parachute that will bring the drone to the ground can be deployed if a larger set of faults occur. If the drone crashes, the outer components are frangible, breaking to release energy and impact the ground with less force.

Zipline's drones are capable of "level 4" autonomy: the ability to complete travel autonomously under normal environmental conditions without requiring pilot oversight.

=== Operation ===
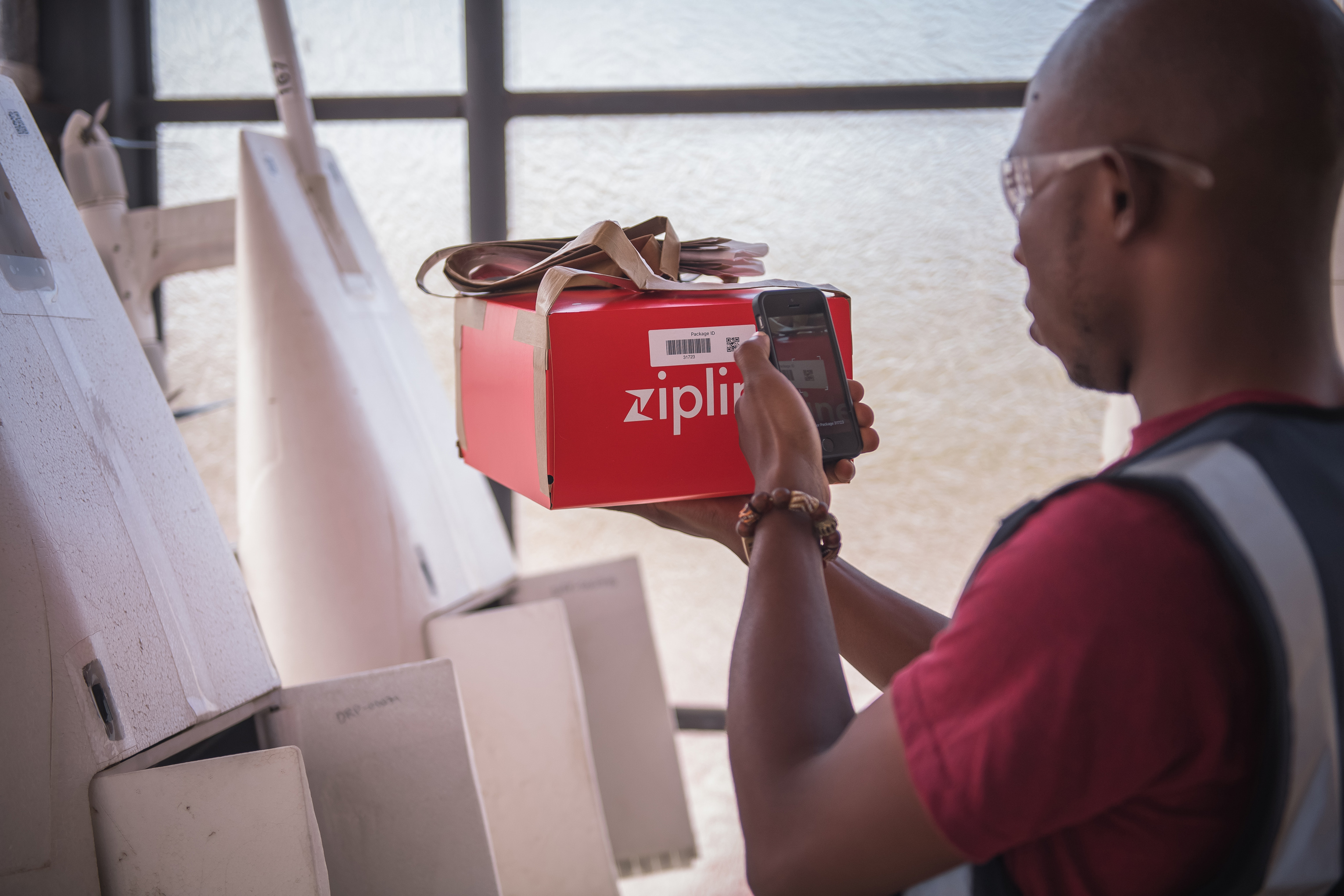
Operator scanning the package before packing for flight

Medical staff at remote hospitals and clinics place orders with Zipline, a fulfillment operator receives this order and prepares the medical products into a special delivery package with a parachute. A Zipline flight operator then packs the medical products into a drone and performs pre-flight checks.

The drone is then launched with a supercapacitor-powered electric catapult launcher which accelerates it to 67 miles per hour (108 km/h) in 0.33 seconds. The drone cruises at 101 km/h (63 mph) at an altitude of 80–120 metres (260–390 ft) above ground level, while a remote pilot at each distribution center monitors all drones in flight. The drone descends to 20–35 metres (66–115 ft) before dropping the package under a paper "Drogue" parachute. A payload can land within a 5 m (16 ft) diameter landing zone.

The drone then returns to the distribution center and lands by its tail hook catching an arresting gear, similar to airplanes landing on an aircraft carrier. A Zipline distribution center can deliver medical supplies reliably anywhere within 100 km (62 mi), even accounting for mountainous terrain and severe weather.

== Platform 2 ==
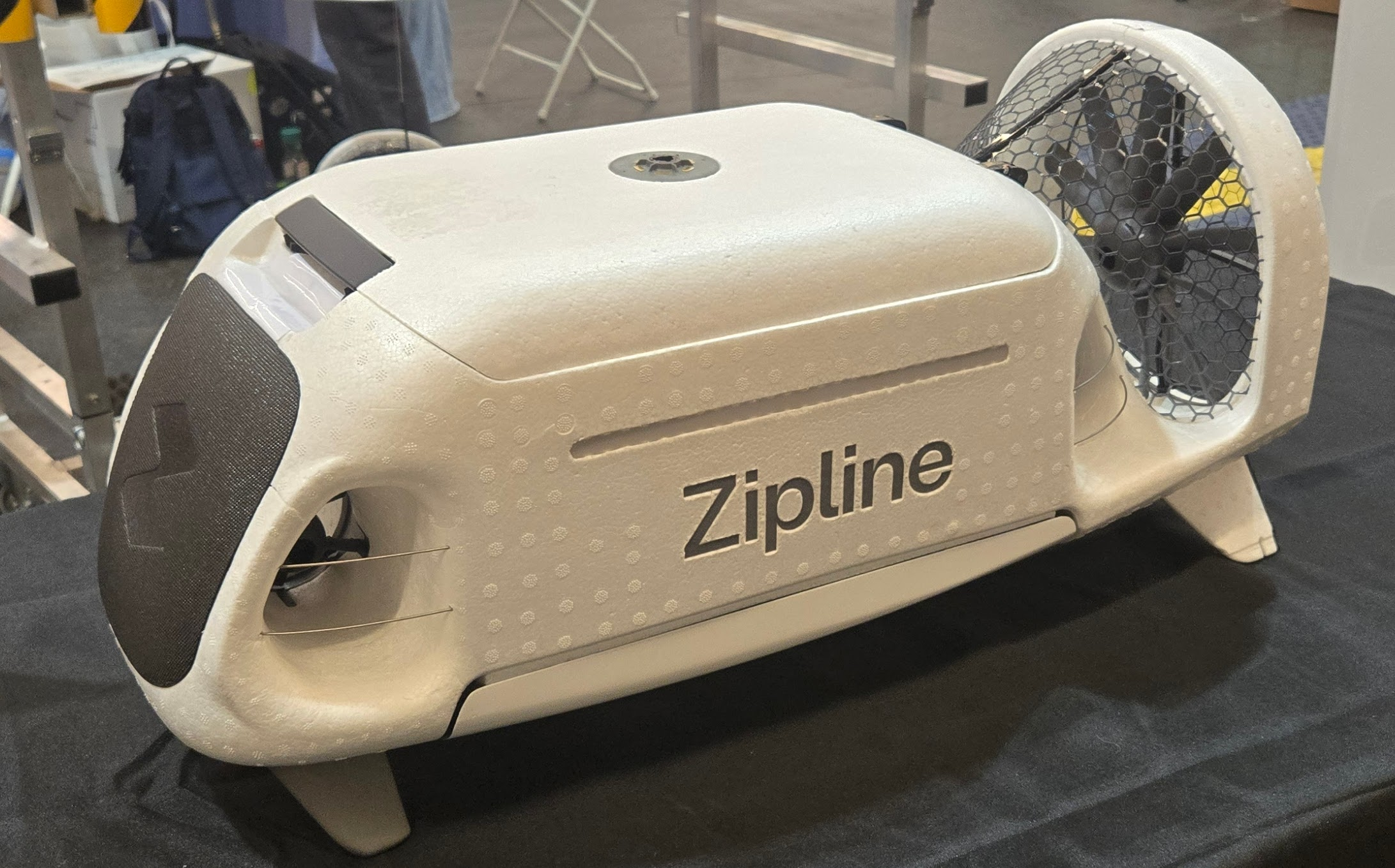
Zipline's delivery "droid" on display

The Platform 2 VTOL drones, launched in April 2025, are suited for shorter range home deliveries. They take off and land vertically, are capable of fixed-wing flight at up to 110 kilometres per hour (70 mph), and hover at an altitude of 100 metres (330 ft) to slowly lower packages on a wire. Packages are lowered in a delivery "droid" that uses sensors and propellers to deliver the package within a 1 metre (3.3 ft) diameter. The drones can carry up to 8 pounds (3.6 kg) of cargo within a 10 mi (16 km) radius, are capable of a more precise delivery than its previous generation, and can recharge autonomously.

== Locations ==
=== Active commercial service ===
==== Rwanda ====
Zipline operates two distribution centers in Rwanda.

Zipline began deliveries at its first distribution center in Muhanga in October 2016. In 2018, the Rwandan government signed a new deal to build a second distribution center near Kayonza, in the eastern part of the country. This deal expanded Zipline's service to include smaller health centers and hospitals and deliver vaccines and other medical products and blood products. Zipline opened the Kayonza distribution center in December 2018. The company hoped this would bring coverage to 80 percent of the country.

Rwanda has mountainous geography and poor road conditions, making an aerial delivery system more efficient than the use of land vehicles. The cost of delivery via drone is comparable to that of delivery by road, especially in emergencies. A 2022 study found that Zipline's service in Rwanda leads to faster delivery times relative to existing ground transportation and less blood component wastage in health facilities. The study found that Zipline's drone delivery service in Rwanda shortened blood product delivery times by 61 percent, reduced blood unit expirations by 67 percent, and was frequently used in response to medical emergencies, with 43 percent of orders being emergency orders.

==== Ghana ====
In 2018, Zipline signed a contract with the government of Ghana to make up to 600 deliveries a day for four years at the cost of about $12.5 million. In April 2019, Ghana's president Nana Akufo-Addo announced the opening of the first distribution center in Ghana. Vice President Mahamudu Bawumia launched the first Zipline drone to Tafo Hospital on April 24, 2019. This first delivery contained a resupply shipment of yellow fever vaccines to prevent stock-out.

In 2021, the government of Ghana expanded its contract with Zipline to add four additional distribution centers, bringing the total number of contracted distribution centers in the country to eight. Zipline presently operates six distribution centers in Ghana, serving over 2,300 health facilities. When the network is complete, Zipline will be able to serve about 85 percent of the population directly and the remainder indirectly, reaching over 3,200 health facilities in every region of the country.

In March 2022, Zipline announced that the company had delivered over one million doses of the COVID-19 vaccine by drone in Ghana over the prior year. An independent study of Zipline's impact on the health system in Ghana found that Zipline's drone delivery service shortened vaccine stock-outs by 60 percent, decreased inventory-driven missed vaccination opportunities by 42 percent, decreased days facilities were without critical medical supplies by 21 percent, and increased the types of medicines and supplies stocked at health facilities by 10 percent.

In 2025, the government of Ghana had amassed roughly US$15 million in unpaid bills for delivery services. In November 2025, the Minority in Parliament Zipline temporarily suspended three of its Ghanaian distribution centers due to the owed debt.

==== United States ====
As of 2018, Zipline was working with the FAA to develop rules for drone operation beyond the line of sight.

During the COVID-19 pandemic in 2020, the FAA granted a Part 107 waiver to Novant Health in partnership with Zipline for the delivery of medical supplies and personal protective equipment to facilities in North Carolina. The company plans to offer deliveries to homes.

On November 18, 2021, Zipline started a trial service with Walmart for e-commerce shopping deliveries in Pea Ridge, Arkansas. The service, selectable to online shoppers using a special mobile app, could deliver to all residences within 50 miles (80 km) of a particular Walmart store in Pea Ridge during daylight hours.

On June 21, 2022, the license "Package Delivery by Drone (Part 135)" was granted.

On October 4, 2022, Zipline began commercial delivery services in Salt Lake City, Utah, in partnership with Intermountain Healthcare.

On September 18, 2023, the FAA announced it had authorized Zipline to begin making commercial deliveries beyond the line of sight without visual observers.

In April 2025, Zipline began making deliveries for Walmart in the Dallas–Fort Worth metroplex using Platform 2 drones.

==== Japan ====
In April 2021, Zipline announced a partnership with an investor, Toyota Tsusho, to deliver medical products in Japan. While most Zipline facilities are staffed by locally hired operators employed by Zipline, the facilities in Japan are distinct in that they are operated by Sora-iina, a Toyota Tsusho Group company, and staffed by Toyota Tsusho employees. Zipline provides hardware and training in an OEM capacity. Construction of the first distribution center was completed in April 2022 on Fukue Island in the Gotō Islands. The drone delivery service will supply medical and pharmaceutical products to medical institutions and pharmacies in the Gotō Islands, which include 140 total islands (and five main localities). The use of drone delivery to assure routine distribution of medical products is expected to cut current sea and air transport options from several hours down to 30 minutes.

==== Nigeria ====
In February 2021, Zipline announced a plan to construct three distribution centers in Kaduna State, Nigeria. These distribution centers would have ultra-cold storage that is capable of safely storing COVID-19 vaccines, for which health facilities in the state could then place on-demand orders without needing ultra-cold storage of their own. The state also intends to use Zipline's service to transport other health products, including blood, medication, and routine vaccines. In May 2021, Zipline announced a similar agreement with Cross River State. In February 2022, Zipline announced another agreement with Bayelsa State.

The first hub opened in Kaduna state in an undisclosed location on June 4, 2022.

==== Côte d'Ivoire ====
In December 2021, the company announced an agreement to open four distribution centers in Côte d'Ivoire, it received its license to begin operations in January 2023.

==== Kenya ====
In February 2022, the company announced an agreement to build a distribution center in Chemelil, Kisumu County. and began in October that year, as well as medical supplies it delivers veterinary goods and animal DNA, it serves 1012 facilities within the surrounding Region.

=== Pending service ===
==== Ukraine ====
In June 2022 it was announced by the Ukrainian Ministry of Health that talks were ongoing to partner with Zipline to build ten Zipline distribution hubs in Ukraine in areas such as Tlumach.

==== United Kingdom ====
In February 2024 Zipline posted adverts on LinkedIn for "Flight Operations Lead", "Head of Business Operations" and "Flight Operator / Maintenance Technician" in Newcastle upon Tyne.

=== Demonstration operations ===
==== Australia ====
Between July 30 and September 5, 2019, Zipline partnered with the US and Australian militaries, delivering over 400 mock blood supplies during mass casualty simulations.
