= Operation Zenith =

Demonstration of Unmanned Aerial Vehicle (UAV) and Air Traffic Management (ATM) in 2018

Operation Zenith was a demonstration of UAV (commonly known as drones) and ATM integration held at Manchester Airport on November 21, 2018. The event aimed to illustrate that "drones can be flown safely alongside manned aircraft in controlled airspace". A total of eight scenarios were demonstrated in real-time, including On Airfield Delivery, Beyond Visual Line-Of-Sight (BVLOS) Infrastructure Inspection, and Commercial VLOS Operations.

The event was coordinated by Air Navigation Service Provider for the United Kingdom, NATS, and British Tech Start-Up, Altitude Angel. A total of 13 independent organisations also took part in the event as "delivery partners", including Vodafone, DJI and Frequentis.

It is regarded as one of the first live demonstrations of its kind and was considered to be the "most technically complex and comprehensive demonstration in the world so far of an UTM (Unmanned aircraft system traffic management) system".

In August 2019, Operation Zenith was a finalist in the CANSO Award of Excellence in ATM.
