= Windracers =

British manufacturer of unmanned aerial vehicles

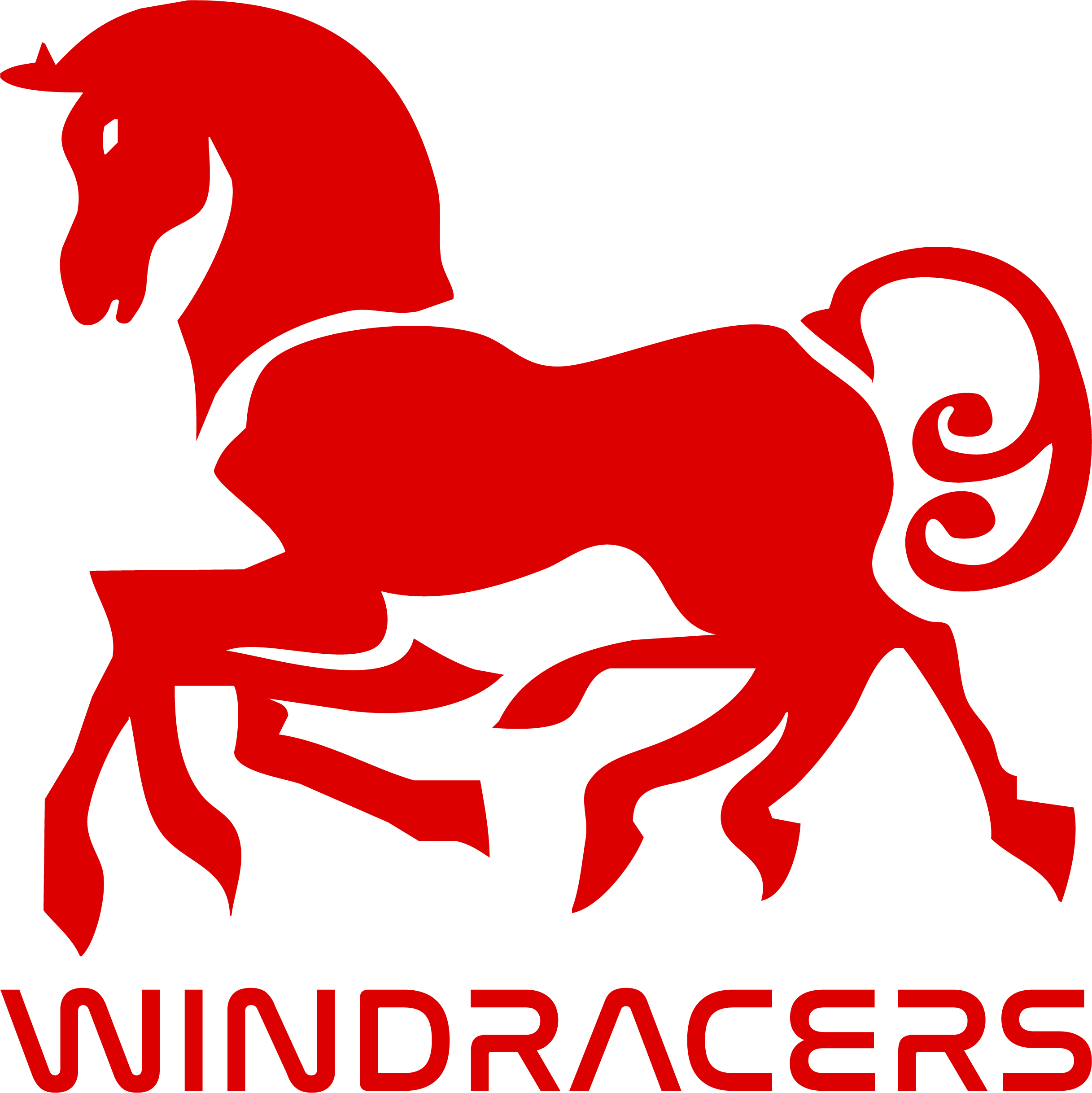
- Industry: Aerospace
- Founded: 2017
- Founder: Stephen Wright
- Headquarters: Fareham, England
- Key people: Simon Thompson (Group CEO), Simon Muderack (CEO)
- Products: See Aircraft
- Website: https://www.windracers.com

Windracers is a UK-based manufacturer of autonomous cargo drones. Founded in 2017, its self-flying aircraft were originally conceived to bring down the cost of delivering humanitarian aid to remote communities. The long-distance unmanned aerial vehicles (UAVs) can fly up to 1,000 km before refuelling and can be used for multiple purposes including mail delivery, defence, humanitarian aid, firefighting and academic research.

== Aircraft ==
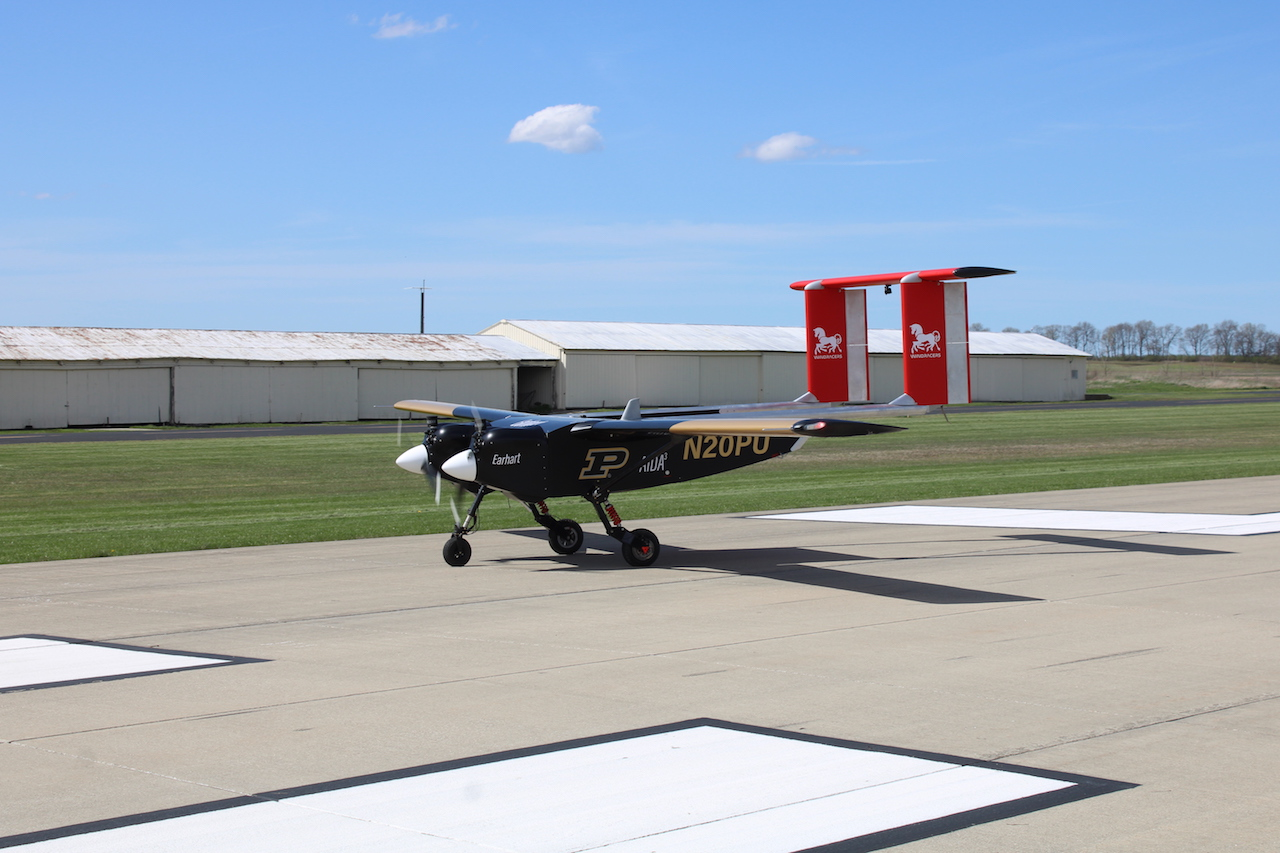
Windracers ULTRA self-flying aircraft

The ULTRA is a fixed-wing aircraft with a 10 m (32 ft) wingspan. It has a twin-boom configuration with a high T-tail to allow easy access to its 700-litre cargo compartment. Power comes from a pair of 627-cc four-stroke engines from Briggs & Stratton. It has been built to withstand operations in harsh environments with rugged construction. It is built from aluminium rather than composite, as it is more damage-tolerant, efficient to fabricate and low-cost. Its components are designed for field repair with minimal parts.

The autonomous drones can carry a load weighing 100kg up to 1,000km. They take off and land like an aeroplane and they have a drop mechanism for the delivery of humanitarian aid.

The ULTRA operates without a remote pilot using the company’s Masterless avionics system. This includes an automated take off and landing capability. Its systems are dual or triple redundant to ensure it can fly safely in the event of a hardware or software failure.

== History ==
The company was founded in 2017 by Stephen Wright. Windracers completed its first successful unmanned aerial vehicle (UAV) flight in December 2020, taking medical supplies from Cornwall to the Isles of Scilly. In 2021 Windracers' drones were used to deliver post between Kirkwall and North Ronaldsay in Scotland's Orkney Islands in a two-week trial carried out by Royal Mail to help better connect remote island communities and reduce carbon emissions.

The Royal Navy began testing the ULTRA in April 2022 as part of the Royal Navy Heavy Lift Challenge and in September 2023, under its defence brand W Autonomous Systems, the company's self-flying aircraft landed on a Royal Navy carrier at sea as a trial for moving supplies between ships without the need to launch traditional helicopters.

British Antarctic Survey used the Ultra drone in February 2024 to map areas of Antarctica that had previously been out of bounds to researchers. It flew thousands of kilometres carrying a variety of scientific payloads.

The company then expanded into USA in April 2024, opening an AI research center with Purdue University. The aim of AIDA3 (AI for Digital, Autonomous and Augmented Aviation) is to ensure self-flying aircraft can operate efficiently and in large numbers, for example the capability for a single controller to monitor multiple aircraft simultaneously.

In May 2024, Windracers announced the appointment of Simon Thompson, a former Royal Mail CEO, as group chief executive of the company. In the same month Jane's Defence Weekly reported that the ULTRA has been conducting intelligence, surveillance, and reconnaissance (ISR) and supporting resupply for the Armed Forces of Ukraine since 2023.

In October 2025, Windracers was recognised by the UK Government and NATO as a trusted partner supporting expanded drone production and supply to Ukraine, including deployment of ULTRA. The announcement formed part of a £600 million UK defence industry investment that delivered over 85,000 drones in six months.
