= Unmanned aircraft system traffic management =

System for cooperative control of unmanned aerial vehicles

Unmanned aircraft system traffic management (UTM) is a collaborative ecosystem for safely managing low-altitude operations of unmanned aircraft systems (UAS). In the United States, the Federal Aviation Administration (FAA) describes UTM as a framework of regulatory requirements, technical capabilities, and interoperable services intended to manage and mitigate risks associated with drone operations.

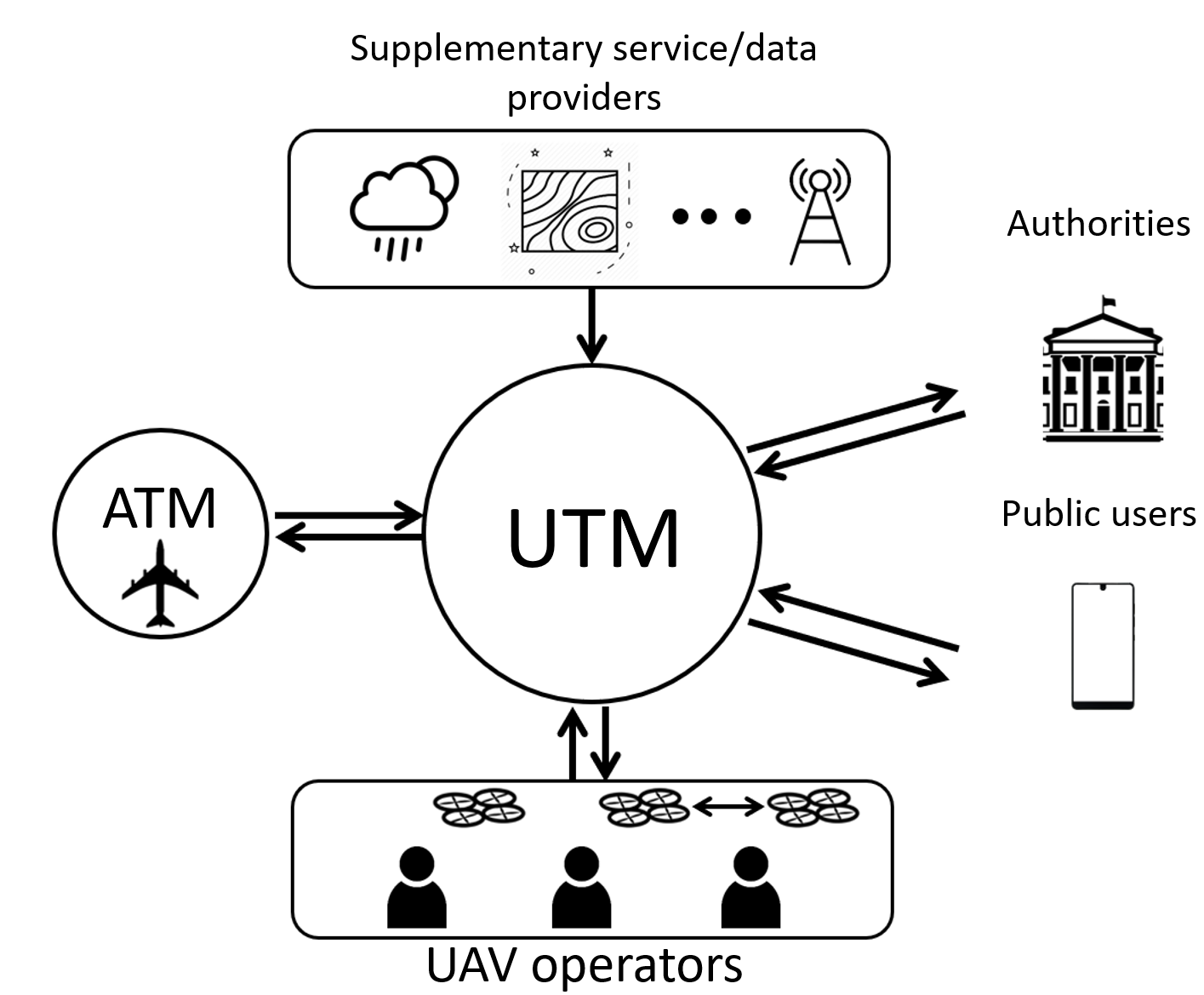
A schematic representation of a UAS Traffic Management system.

UTM is separate from, but complementary to, conventional air traffic management and FAA air traffic services. According to the FAA, UTM supports functions such as flight planning, authorization, surveillance, and conflict management, and is intended to enable multiple beyond visual line of sight (BVLOS) drone operations in areas where FAA air traffic services are not provided, generally through a distributed network of highly automated systems rather than voice communication with controllers.

NASA conducted the original UAS Traffic Management research project to explore how small UAS could safely access low-altitude airspace beyond visual line of sight. That project concluded after a series of field demonstrations, and the project page is now retained online for historical purposes. Later NASA work continued under related advanced air mobility and ATM exploration activities.

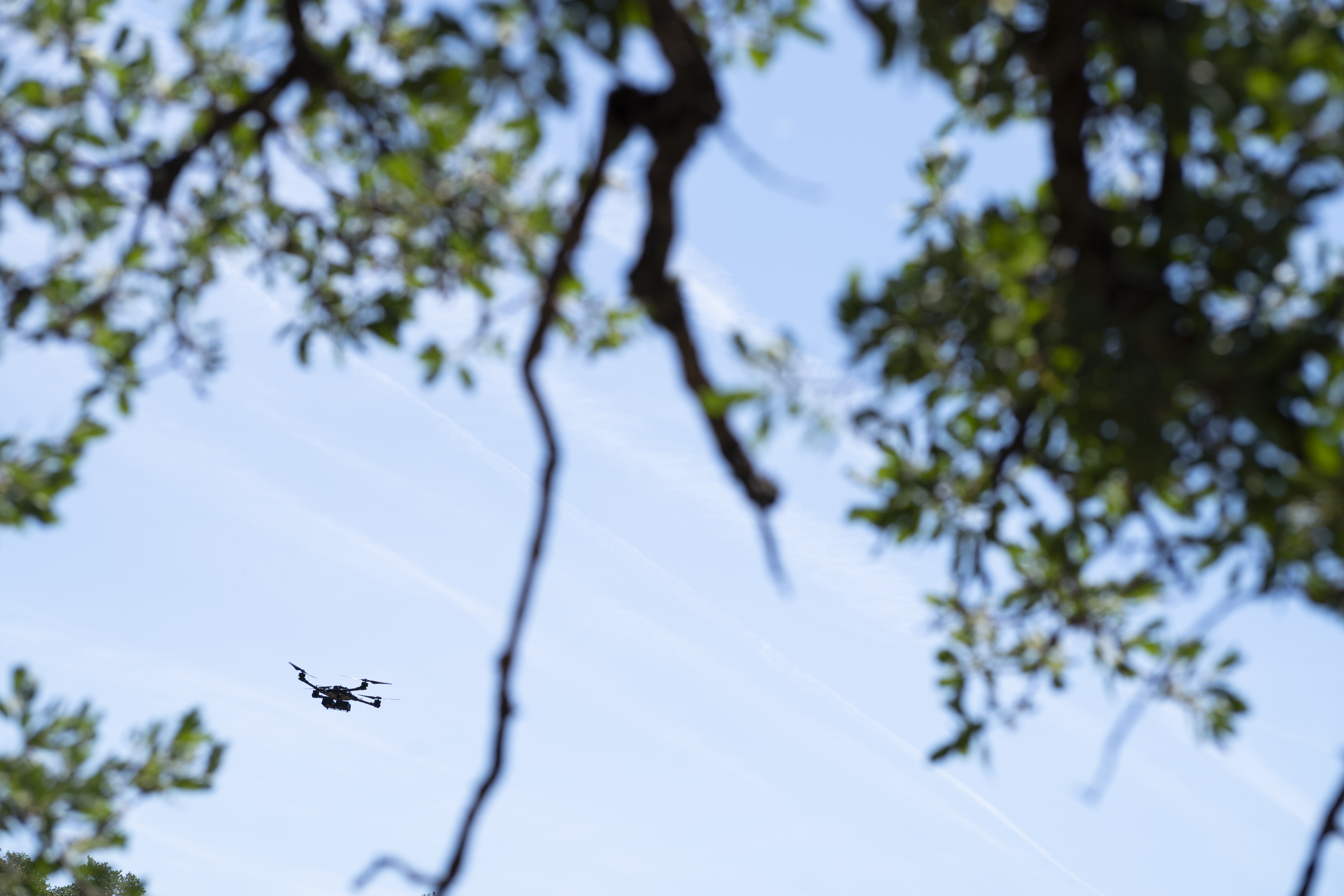
NASA STEReO field testing in California in 2021, applying UTM-related concepts to public-safety operations.

== United States ==
The FAA's near-term implementation of UTM includes the Near-Term Approval Process (NTAP), under which the agency evaluates the safety-mitigation value of third-party UTM services for low-altitude drone operations. The FAA states that NTAP is not a certification process; rather, it is a process through which operators may receive safety credit for using an evaluated service when applying for waivers or exemptions.

The FAA has also described a UTM Operational Evaluation launched in 2023 to test federated data sharing, governance, and strategic deconfliction for overlapping BVLOS operations. According to the agency, the evaluation involves industry operators, service providers, NASA, and a shared-airspace governance approach based on industry consensus standards. By 2025, the FAA had begun issuing Letters of Acceptance (LOAs) to service providers supporting strategic deconfliction in shared airspace.

UTM is also relevant to broader U.S. advanced air mobility planning. In July 2023, the FAA published its Advanced Air Mobility Implementation Plan (Innovate28), outlining steps intended to enable initial AAM operations at one or more sites at scale by 2028.

A further policy milestone came in 2025, when the FAA published the Drone Integration: Concept of Operations, which stated that proposed third-party services under a future Part 146 would support the UTM ecosystem for BVLOS operations.

== Europe ==
In Europe, the counterpart to UTM is generally referred to as U-space, a regulatory and operational framework intended to enable the safe, secure and efficient integration of large numbers of drones into shared airspace. EASA states that the U-space regulatory framework is composed of three regulations—Commission Implementing Regulations (EU) 2021/664, 2021/665 and 2021/666—together with associated AMC and GM.

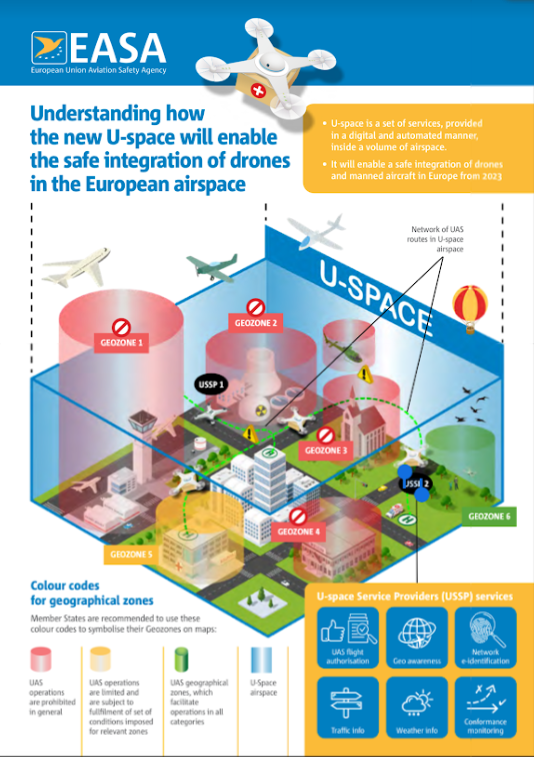
EASA illustration of the U-space concept.

Under the EASA framework, a U-space airspace is a geographical zone designated by a Member State following an airspace risk assessment. In such airspace, UAS operators must use mandatory U-space services provided by certified U-space service providers (USSPs). EASA identifies four mandatory services: network identification, geo-awareness, flight authorisation, and traffic information.

A significant deployment milestone was reached in May 2025, when EASA issued its first USSP certificate, to ANRA Technologies. EASA described the certification as a step toward harmonised and scalable U-space deployment across Europe.

In January 2026, the SESAR Joint Undertaking published the U-space Implementation Handbook, summarising early deployment experience and lessons learned from projects such as U-ELCOME and other Digital Sky Demonstrators.

A further example of industry participation in the evolving U-space ecosystem is ASO Airspace Surveillance, a company based in Bucharest, Romania, which develops UTM software solutions specifically tailored for vertiport operations and advanced air mobility (AAM). Its platform, Skyware, focuses on full-spectrum airspace management, combining real-time UTM capabilities, drone traffic sequencing, and seamless U-space integration. These systems are designed to support high-density, mixed-traffic environments by providing smart airspace intelligence, enabling efficient coordination between drones, eVTOL aircraft, and conventional airspace users. Such solutions illustrate how commercial providers are complementing the regulatory framework with operational tools required for scalable and safe deployment of U-space services in complex urban environments.

== Main functions ==
Typical UTM or U-space functions include:

- strategic organisation of low-altitude airspace;
- digital flight planning and flight authorisation;
- surveillance, tracking and network identification of UAS;
- provision of geo-awareness and traffic information;
- conflict management and strategic deconfliction between multiple UAS operations;
- coordination between UAS operators, service providers, and, where relevant, conventional air traffic management and air navigation service providers.

== Operation Zenith ==
Operation Zenith was a 2018 demonstration at Manchester Airport intended to show the integration of drones, UTM technologies and conventional ATM in operational airspace. Contemporary coverage described it as a major early live demonstration of UTM concepts in the United Kingdom.

== See also ==
- Advanced air mobility
- U-space
- Beyond visual line of sight
- Low Altitude Authorization and Notification Capability
