= Domenico Casalino =

Italian executive

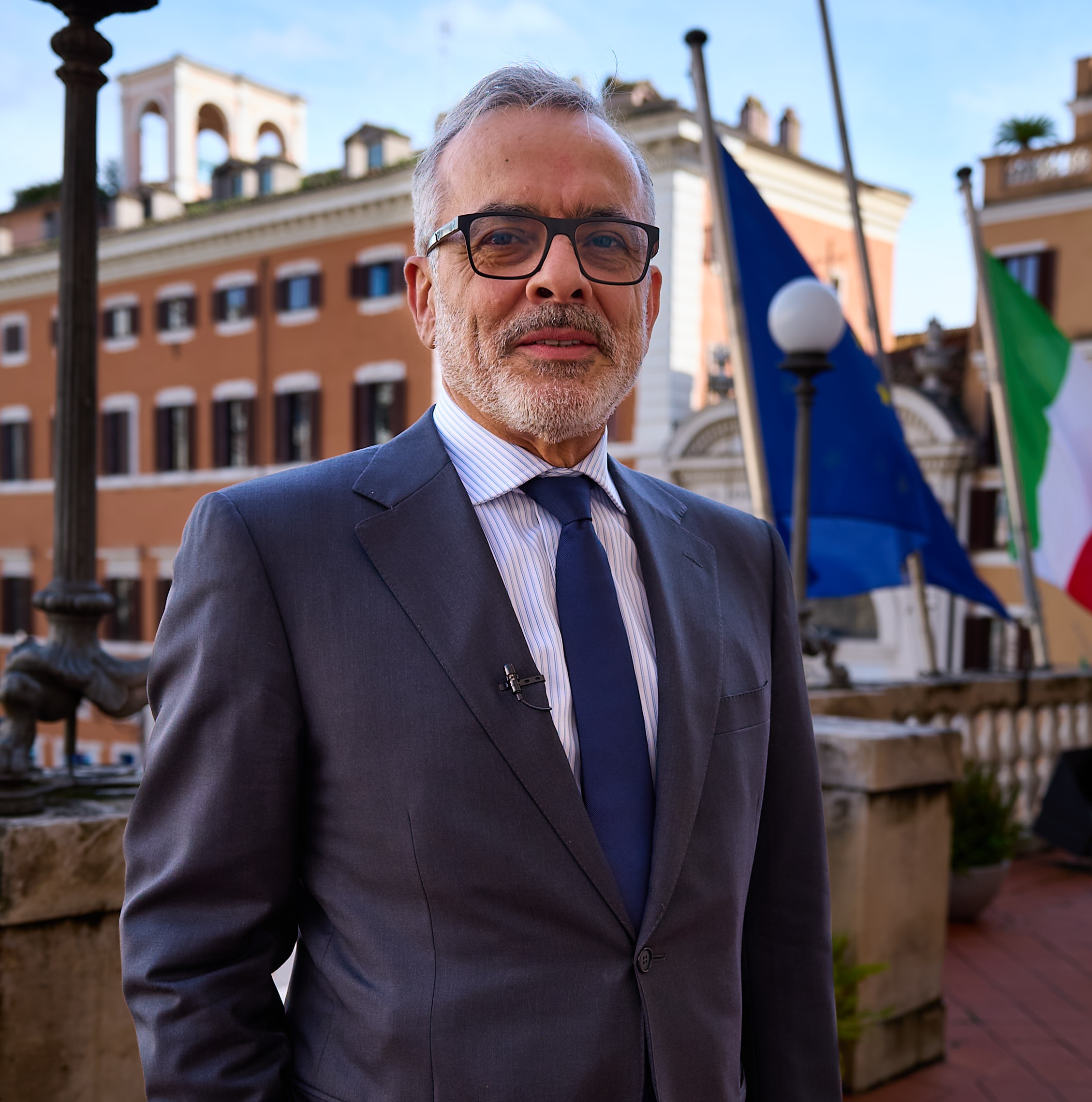

Personal details
- Born: Domenico Casalino; 11 January 1962 (age 64) Turin, Italy
- Children: 2
- Education: Sapienza University of Rome; Link Campus University; Italian Society for International Organizations; Institute for Advanced Defense Studies – IASD
- Occupation: Executive
- Known for: CEO of Consip and CEO of Techno Sky

Domenico Casalino (Turin, 11 January 1962) is an Italian executive and adjunct faculty member at LUISS Business School. He was CEO of Consip, a public stock company owned by the Italian Ministry of Economy and Finance operating in the public procurement services field and Techno Sky, the ENAV Group society for maintenance and development of the air traffic management technologies.

== Early life ==
Ever since his early youth Casalino was directly involved in social activity and in the State: first as a volunteer of the Red Cross (1977); then as an officer in the 78th Infantry Regiment "Lupi di Toscana" (1982).

After completing his studies with a degree in economics from the Sapienza University of Rome, Casalino specialized in Intelligence and Security Studies at the Link Campus – University of Malta, in Space Institutions and Policies at SIOI – Italian Society for International Organization, in Strategy and Security at the IASD, Institute for Advanced Defence Studies.

== Career ==
He began his professional career at the Treasury Department of the Italian Ministry of Economy and Finance, where from 1988 until 2006 joined progressively increasing responsibility and duties.

Casalino worked closely with the General Director of the Treasury Department, Mario Draghi, participating in priority projects – including the modernization of the forecasting systems for the accounting of state treasury and the forecasting systems for public finance – up to become responsible for the ICT System of the same department. Later, the collaboration of Casalino continued with Domenico Siniscalco and Vittorio Grilli.

During this period, he joined the duties of vice president of Consip, member of the Board of Directors of the bank Coopercredito SpA (BNL group), member of the Monitoring Committee on compulsory liquidation of Financial Società Italiana Ernesto Breda and Reggiane OMI (both companies of the dissolved EFIM), member of the Regional Evaluation Group on health investment in the Lazio Region (as an expert in ICT systems), member of the Board for the approval of microprocessors of the Italian electronic identity card.

He also participated in GIPAF – an interdisciplinary group for the administrative prevention of fraud on payment cards held by the Ministry of Economy and Finance, and became a member of ACFE – Association of Certified Fraud Examiners – Italy Chapter.

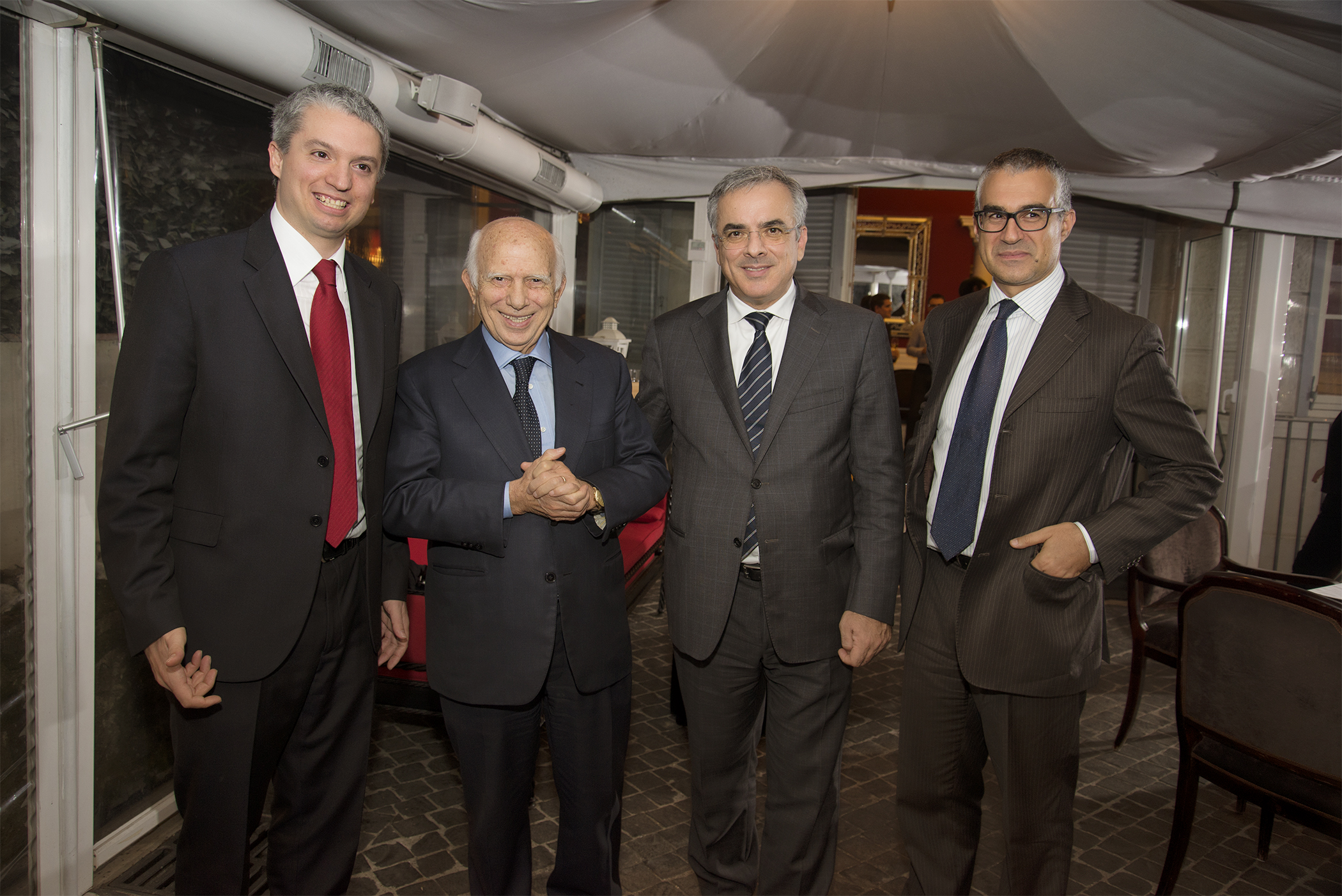
Casalino at the Trinità dei Monti think tank, with his president (first from left) Perluigi Testa

From 2007 to 2011, he was in ENAV – National Society of Air Navigation Services, where he was appointed head of ICT internal systems and participates in the start-up of priority projects, including 'Single European Sky', initiative of the European Commission focused on reforming the architecture of air traffic management system to meet future capacity and safety needs.

From 2011 to 2015, he was chief executive officer of Consip. The appointment sealed a professional career has always focused on new technologies, of which the National central purchasing – at whose creation Casalino participates from the earliest moments – is an example of Italian excellence also at international level.

From 2015 to 2017 he was chief executive officer of Techno Sky, the ENAV Group society for maintenance and development of the air traffic management technologies (software, radars and other technologies for the air traffic control).

In 2017, he was CEO of AC Group, an Italian company operating on the IoT domain for the automotive industry.

From 2017 to 201,9 he was CEO of VPE, an ISO:17020 independent inspection body.

== International background ==
In September 2012, he was invited to the 12° conference Good governance and the establishment of institutional-based states in Cairo, Egypt, as the lead speaker on Good governance and public procurement.

Then he attended the launching of the MENA-OECD Network on Public Procurement, co-chaired by Consip, Tunisia and Morocco.

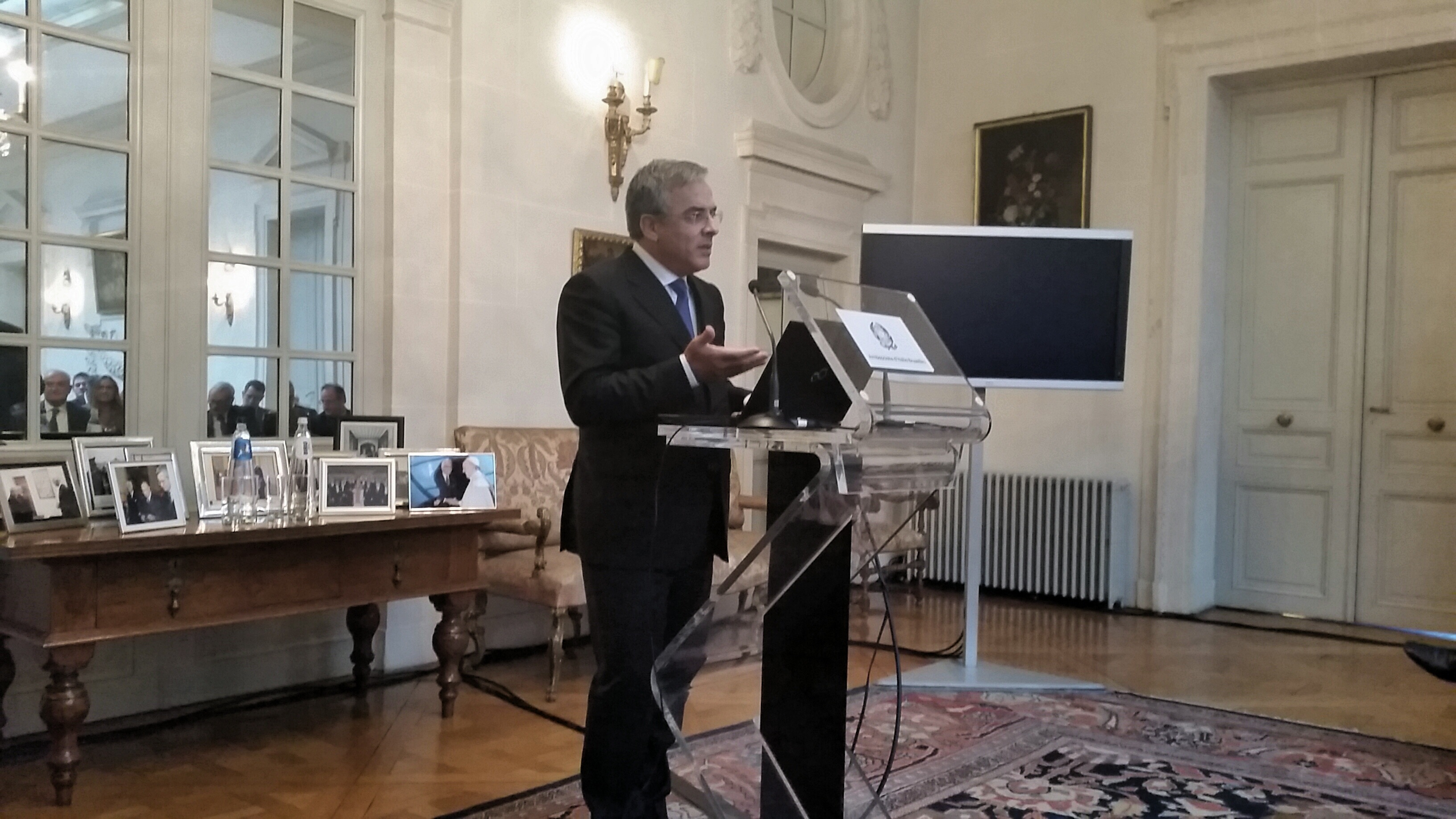
Casalino, speaker at the "Innovation in the IT sector" seminar. Brussels, Italian Embassy (8–10–2014).

In 2013, Casalino was designated as lead procurement practitioner for the launching of the OECD Leading Practitioners meeting in OECD headquarters, together with 20 other worldwide senior procurement experts.

In February, he was invited speaker to the first Anti-Corruption Working Group (G20), within the framework of Russia's G20 Presidency.

In July, Consip and PPS (Public Procurement Service), the Korean Central Purchasing Body, signed in Rome the new 'Memorandum of Understanding on Public Procurement'.

Casalino participated as lead member of the Procurement G6, the most important international network among government procurement agencies involving Italy, the US, Republic of Korea, the UK, Canada and Chile, in the MMGP, Multilateral Meeting on Government Procurement, on September.

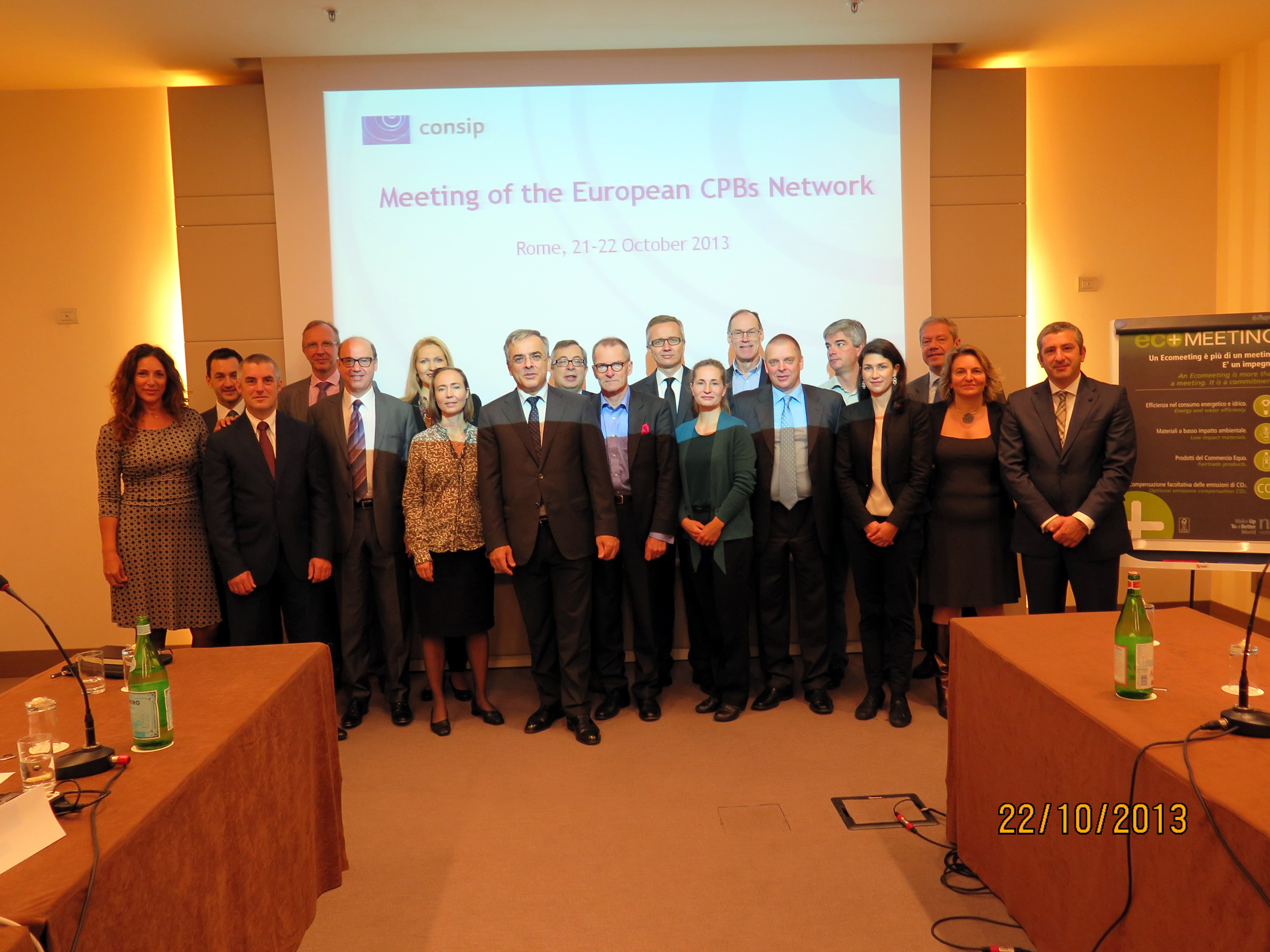
Casalino (in the middle) organized the European CPBs meeting, Rome 2013, at Consip.

In the same period the co-chairmanship of Consip of the MENA-OECD Network on Government Procurement was renewed, together with Morocco, Tunisia and the Republic of Korea, to support countries of the Arab Spring for the development of more transparent and efficient procurement systems.

In October, he organised the first Italian meeting of the European Network among Central Purchasing Bodies (CPBs), involving the major CPBs of Europe.

In 2014, he was a member of the Advisory Committee of the MENA-OECD Governance Programme Training Centre of Caserta, together with the Ministers of Public Administration of Italy, Egypt, Jordan, Morocco and Libya.

He participates in relevant international cooperation projects – coordinated by the World Bank, and the European Commission – aimed at implementing locally advanced national procurement systems and centralised procurement models (Greece, Ethiopia, etc.).

== Academic roles ==
Casalino is an Adjunct Faculty Member at LUISS Business School and a visiting professor at LUISS University (Corporate Governance and Internal Audit) and lecturer at several universities and institutions, including Sapienza University of Rome and Link Campus University. He is the Scientific Director and visiting professor for the Executive Programme in Bid and Proposal Management at LUISS Business School, and he has been:

- Member of the Scientific Committee of the GASP – Procurement in Public Sector And Healthcare, Master 2016–2017, Luiss Business School.
- Member of the Strategic Committee for the Digital Agenda, 2014–2015, Luiss Business School.
- Member of the Scientific Committee of the PPM – Public Procurement Management, International Master, University of Rome Tor Vergata, 2014.
- Member of the advisory board of the EMIT – Executive Master in IT Governance & Management, Luiss Business School, 2013.

From 2024, Casalino is the Scientific Director and teacher at the Executive Programme in Bid and Proposal Management at LUISS Business School.

== Publications ==
- Il Public Procurement tra vecchie e nuove sfide in The Procurement – Il grande polo del Procurement e della Supply Chain, Milano, The Procurement S.B., Anno 11, n. 2 2025, ISSN 2704-6559
- Patrimonio culturale: un'industria in cui l'Italia può essere protagonista in Specchio Economico, 05-2016
- Spending review e buona gestione nel libero mercato, cosa ci insegna la storia? in Formiche.net, 26-04-2016
- La manutenzione 3.0 in Cleared ENAV magazine, N. 10 - 11.2015
- Cosa si può ottenere con un buon procurement pubblico in Formiche, N. 105 - 07.2015
- Introduzione in Barillari G. La Fattura Elettronica per la PA, Narcissus, 2015
- Piccole e medie imprese tra opportunità e sfide: Consip e altri aggregatori, nuovi canali di accesso alla domanda pubblica, Quaderni Consip, 2015
- Legalità e trasparenza: la sfida vincente in Franchini C. e Sciaudone F. Il recepimento in Italia delle nuove direttive appalti e concessioni. Elementi critici e opportunità, Napoli, Editoriale scientifica, 2015, ISBN 978-88-6342-725-7
- Ecco come si fa cybersecurity gestionale in Formiche.net, 23.11.2014
- Come cambia il mercato elettronico della PA, per le startup in agendadigitale.eu, 23.6.2014
- L'aggregazione della domanda pubblica: un modello in equilibrio tra passato e futuro in AA.VV. Problematiche e prospettive nel percorso di riduzione della spesa pubblica in Italia, Roma, Il Mulino, 2014, ISBN 978-88-15-25331-6
- Così si attua la spending review sulla Sanità in Formiche, N. 95 - 8/9.2014
- I trasporti nelle operazioni di soccorso: emergenza nell'emergenza. in PROTEC – rivista internazionale di politica, tecnologia, logistica di protezione civile ed ecologia, Roma, Publi&Consult international, Anno II, n. 10, 31 dicembre 1987, SBN 2591534
- L’importanza della cooperazione internazionale in PROTEC – rivista internazionale di politica, tecnologia, logistica di protezione civile ed ecologia, Publi & Consult international, Anno II, nn. 8–9, 15 ottobre 1987, SBN 2591534

== Honours ==
5th Class / Knight Order of Merit of the Italian Republic, 2002.

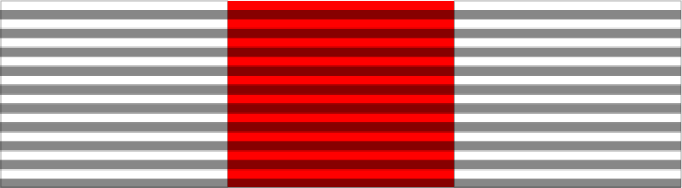
Italian Red Cross Meritorious (it: ‘Benemerito della Croce Rossa italiana’), 1990.

Best in Class 2012, Alumni Association of Graduates in Economics at 'Sapienza' Università di Roma.

Premio Comparto Aerospaziale 2016, Demetra Centro Studi at ENAC, 12 July 2016.

Italian Red Cross Meritorious (it: ‘Benemerito della Croce Rossa italiana’) for intervention in 1980 Irpinia earthquake, 1982.

== Social commitment ==
He is an Officer of the Red Cross and has been a Red Cross Volunteer since 1977, participating at several international emergency operations (Sahel ‘85, operating in Niamey and Geneva) – such as in loco delegate of the International Federation of Red Cross and Red Crescent Societies – national emergency operations ('80 Irpinia earthquake, '84 L'Aquila earthquake) and CIVIS projects on cooperation between volunteers of CRI and DRK.

Casalino also participated in the start-up of the web identity projects of the International Red Cross.

== Personal life ==
Father of Valerio and Giorgia.

== See also ==
- Consip
- Italian Ministry of Economy and Finance

Business positions
Preceded by	CEO, VPE; 2017-2019	Succeeded by Giovanni Maraviglia
Preceded by Andrea Spoto	CEO, AC Group; 2017	Succeeded by Adelfo Paternó
Preceded by Mauro Cipollini	CEO, Techno Sky; 2015-2017	Succeeded by Massimo Bellizzi
Preceded by Domenico Casalino	CEO, Consip; 2012–2015	Succeeded by Luigi Marroni
Preceded by Danilo Broggi	CEO, Consip; 2011–2012	Succeeded by Domenico Casalino
Preceded by Giovanni Catanzaro	Vice president, Consip; 2011–2012	Succeeded by -
