= PPS =

PPS commonly refers to:

- Post-postscript, an afterthought, usually in a document.

PPS may also refer to:

== Aviation ==
- Puerto Princesa International Airport, Palawan, Philippines (by IATA code)
- Priority Passenger Service, in Singapore Airlines' frequent flyer programme

== Business and finance ==
- Pay per sale, a payment method used in affiliate marketing
- Premium Packaged Spirits or Pre-Packaged Spirits, a term for alcopops
- Purchasing power standard, an artificial currency unit
- Public Procurement Service, a South Korean government agency

== Government ==
- Palestinian Preventive Security, a Palestinian domestic intelligence agency
- Parliamentary Private Secretary, a UK and New Zealand government post
- Parliamentary Protective Service, a Canadian law enforcement agency
- Partnership for Prosperity and Security in the Caribbean, an agreement between nations in the Caribbean region
- Personal Public Service Number, an identifier used in the Republic of Ireland
- Planning Policy Statements, under the UK's Planning and Compulsory Purchase Act 2004
- Principal Private Secretary, a senior civil service post supporting a cabinet minister in the United Kingdom
- Prospective payment system, a health care payment model in the United States
- Public Prosecution Service (disambiguation), various bodies charged with bringing criminal prosecutions to court
- Public Procurement Service, South Korea
- Provincial Police Service (disambiguation), state civil service for police in India

== Education ==
- Paterson Public Schools, a school district in New Jersey, US
- Pawhuska Public Schools, a school district in Oklahoma, US
- Peoria Public Schools, a school district in Illinois, US
- Princeton Public Schools, another New Jersey school district
- Pittsburgh Public Schools, a school district in Pennsylvania, US
- Portland Public Schools (Oregon), another US school district
- Politics, Psychology and Sociology, an undergraduate degree course at the University of Cambridge

== Political parties ==
- Pact for Sicily (Italian: Patto per la Sicilia), Italy
- Party of Progress and Socialism, Morocco
- Pirate Party Switzerland
- Polish Socialist Party (Polish: Polska Partia Socjalistyczna)
- Popular Socialist Party (Brazil)
- Popular Socialist Party (Mexico)

== Science and technology ==
=== Computing ===
- .pps, or PowerPoint Show, a file format used by the Microsoft PowerPoint presentation software
- Packets per second, a measure of throughput
- PPS.tv, Chinese peer-to-peer streaming video network software
- Programmable power supply
  - USB-C PPS
- Proofpoint Protection Server, a commercial product to detect and quarantine spam
- Pulse per second signal, in the Network Time Protocol

=== Medicine ===
- Parkinson plus syndrome, a group of neurodegenerative diseases
- Pentosan polysulfate, a drug used to treat interstitial cystitis
- Popliteal pterygium syndrome, an inherited condition affecting the face, limbs, and genitalia
- Post-polio syndrome, a condition that affects some people who have previously survived an acute attack of poliomyelitis
- Puppy pregnancy syndrome, a delusional illness in humans

=== Military technology and weapons ===
- Precise Positioning Service, a military Global Positioning System feature
- PPS submachine gun, a Soviet WWII-era submachine gun
- Walther PPS, a compact semi-automatic pistol

=== Organic chemistry ===
- Poly(p-phenylene sulfide), a thermoplastic polymer
  - PPS film capacitor, with a polyphenylene sulfide dielectric
- PPS Silent Surfactant, a cleavable detergent in biochemistry

=== Other science and technology ===
- Portable power station

== Other uses ==
- Popular Patristics Series, a book series by Saint Vladimir's Orthodox Theological Seminary Press
- Project for Public Spaces, a US nonprofit organization
- Puyo Puyo Sun, a 1996 puzzle video game
- Princess Peach: Showtime!, a 2024 video game
- Premier Program Service (a.k.a. PPS), a proposed, but never launched, fifth television network that would have been operated by MCA Inc. & Paramount Communications

== See also ==
- PP (disambiguation)
- PS (disambiguation)
