= Casalino (surname) =

Casalino is an Italian surname. Notable people with the surname include:

- Domenico Casalino (born 1962), Italian executive
- Lisa Casalino (born 1972), American jazz singer and songwriter
- Roberto Casalino (born 1979), Italian singer-songwriter

== See also ==
- Casalino
