= B&P =

B&P may refer to:

- Baltimore and Potomac Rail Road
- Boston and Providence Railroad
- Buffalo and Pittsburgh Railroad
- Bid and proposal
