= Fabbrini =

Fabbrini is an Italian surname. Notable people with the surname include:

- Andrea Fabbrini (born 1974), Italian footballer
- Diego Fabbrini (born 1990), Italian footballer
- Sergio Fabbrini (born 1949), Italian political scientist
- Giuseppe Antonio Fabbrini (c.1740 - c. 1795), Florentine painter
