= Giovanni Orsina =

Italian historian

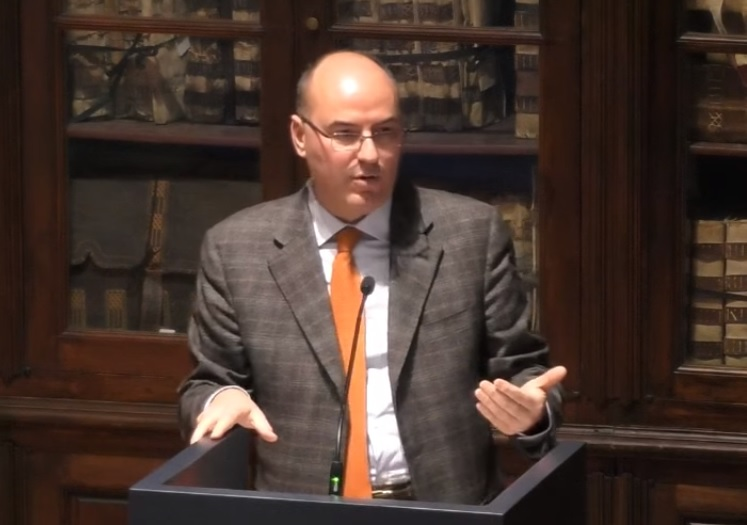
Orsina on 2 December 2015

Giovanni Orsina (born in 1967 in Rome) is a full professor of Contemporary History at LUISS Guido Carli University in Rome. His main fields of research and teaching are the history of political parties, comparative history of European political systems and the history of journalism. For the academic year 2008/2009 he was director of the new Master in European Studies programme.

Before that, he taught contemporary history at the Universities of Bologna, L’Aquila and Roma La Sapienza.

As Scientific Director of the Fondazione Luigi Einaudi in Rome, he coordinated research projects about Italian post-war liberalism. He was also involved in the Luigi Einaudi exhibition, which opened at the Quirinal Palace on May 12, 2008.

Orsina has held different academic positions in Great Britain and France. He was Italian visiting fellow at St Antony's College, Oxford in 1997-98, visiting professor at the Institut d'études politiques de Paris in 2004, and at the École Normale Supérieure de Cachan in 2006.

Starting from academic year 2010/11, he teaches in the first English-taught Master Degree Course in International Relations at LUISS. At LUISS University he is also deputy director of School of Government, the graduate school of the university aimed at creating the new public policy elite of Europe.

== Publications ==
- Senza Chiesa né classe. Il partito radicale nell’età giolittiana, Rome, 1998; edited (with G. Quagliariello);
- La formazione della classe politica in Europa, 1945–1956, Manduria-Bari-Rome, 2000;
- La crisi del sistema politico italiano e il Sessantotto. Una ricerca di storia orale, Soveria Mannelli, 2005;
- Etudiants universitaires et politique en Italie, 1945–1968, «Parlement(s). Histoire et Politique», 2007;
- Quando l’Antifascismo sconfisse l’antifascismo. Interpretazioni della resistenza nell’alta cultura antifascista italiana (1955–65), «Ventunesimo secolo», 2005;
- The United States according to the Italian Communist Press (1945–53), «Telos», 2004 (with Elena Aga Rossi);
- L’Ottocento politico inglese nella storiografia di fine Novecento, «Ricerche di storia politica», 1999;
- Il dito e la luna. Politica, cultura e società nella storiografia inglese degli anni Novanta, in G. Orsina (ed.), Fare storia politica, Soveria Mannelli, 2000.

He is presently working on a revision of the history of the Italian Republic, trying to interpret it from a liberal point of view.
