= Corrado Campisi =

Italian astrophysicist

- Born: 1984; Genoa, Italy
- Citizenship: Italian
- Occupation: Professor

Corrado Campisi is a professor at the Victor Babeș University of Medicine and Pharmacy, Timișoara in Timișoara, Romania. He is also a member of the European Society of Lymphology and the International Society of Lymphology.

== Life ==
Prof. Corrado is an alumnus of University of Genoa. He attended Surgery of Lymphatic Pathologies and Microsurgery and received two Masters in Reconstructive microsurgery at the Reconstructive Microsurgery European School and in Healthcare and Pharmaceutical Administration at LUISS Rome Business School.

Prof. Corrado served as a surgeon at the San Martino Hospital in Genoa (2009–2014). Then he joined Hospital de la Santa Creu i Sant Pau in Barcelona. In 2015, he joined ICLAS Clinical Institute, GVM Care & Research in Rapallo. Prof. Corrado was a visiting professor of the Breast surgery/plastic surgery division at Columbia University Medical Center in New York (2013). He has participated as a lecturer in the training of nuclear physicians of Columbia University, with particular reference to the best use of Lymphoscintigraphy diagnostics for the study of lymphatic insufficiency of the upper limbs.

== Major publications ==
- Campisi, Corradino; Bellini, Carlo; Campisi, Corrado; Accogli, Susanna; Bonioli, Eugenio; Boccardo, Francesco (2010). "Microsurgery for lymphedema: Clinical research and long-term results". Microsurgery. 30 (4): 256–260. doi:10.1002/micr.20737. ISSN 1098-2752. PMID 20235160. S2CID 29633022.
- Campisi, Corradino; Eretta, Costantino; Pertile, Davide; Rin, Elisa Da; Campisi, Corrado; Macciò, Alberto; Campisi, Mirko; Accogli, Susanna; Bellini, Carlo; Bonioli, Eugenio; Boccardo, Francesco (2007). "Microsurgery for treatment of peripheral lymphedema: Long-term outcome and future perspectives". Microsurgery. 27 (4): 333–338. doi:10.1002/micr.20346. ISSN 1098-2752. PMID 17477420. S2CID 1939395.
- Campisi, Corrado C.; Boccardo, Francesco; Piazza, Cesare; Campisi, Corradino (2013). "Evolution of chylous fistula management after neck dissection". Current Opinion in Otolaryngology & Head and Neck Surgery. 21 (2): 150–6. doi:10.1097/MOO.0b013e32835e9d97. ISSN 1068-9508. PMID 23449286. S2CID 26636716.
- Guiotto, Martino; Bramhall, Russell J.; Campisi, Corrado; Raffoul, Wassim; di Summa, Pietro Giovanni (22 May 2019). "A Systematic Review of Outcomes After Genital Lymphedema Surgery: Microsurgical Reconstruction Versus Excisional Procedures". Annals of Plastic Surgery. 83 (6): e85 – e91. doi:10.1097/SAP.0000000000001875. ISSN 1536-3708. PMID 31135508. S2CID 167221366.
- Boccardo, Francesco; Dessalvi, Sara; Campisi, Corrado; Molinari, Lidia; Spinaci, Stefano; Talamo, Giuseppina; Campisi, Corradino (2014). "Microsurgery for groin lymphocele and lymphedema after oncologic surgery". Microsurgery. 34 (1): 10–13. doi:10.1002/micr.22129. hdl:11567/809948. ISSN 1098-2752. PMID 23843265. S2CID 955480.
- di Summa, Pietro G.; Kingham, Paul J.; Campisi, Corrado C.; Raffoul, Wassim; Kalbermatten, Daniel F. (20 June 2014). "Collagen (NeuraGen®) nerve conduits and stem cells for peripheral nerve gap repair". Neuroscience Letters. 572: 26–31. doi:10.1016/j.neulet.2014.04.029. ISSN 0304-3940. PMID 24792394. S2CID 2768913.
