= Consip =

Italian state-owned company

Consip S.p.A.
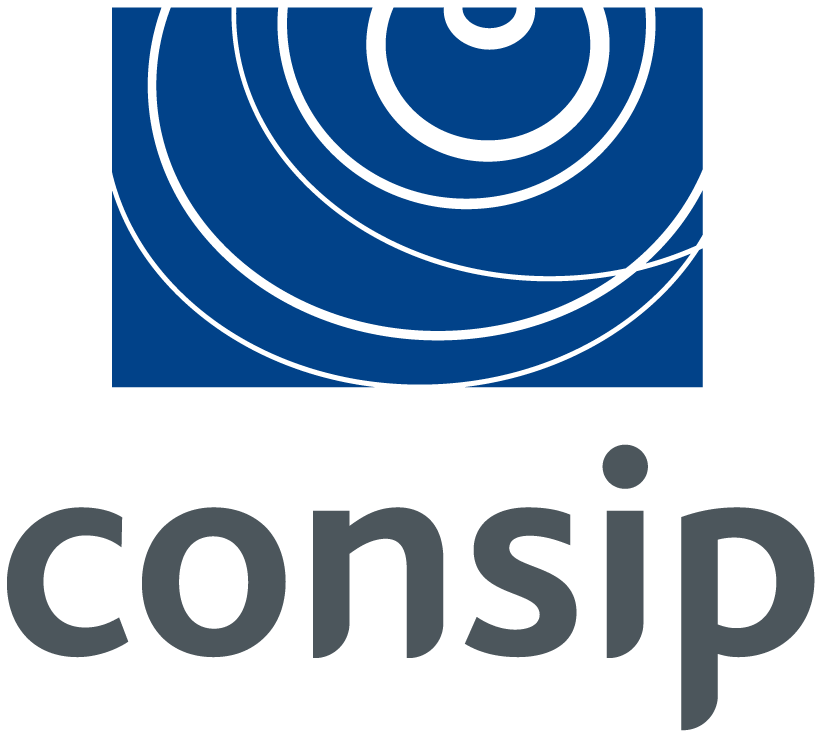

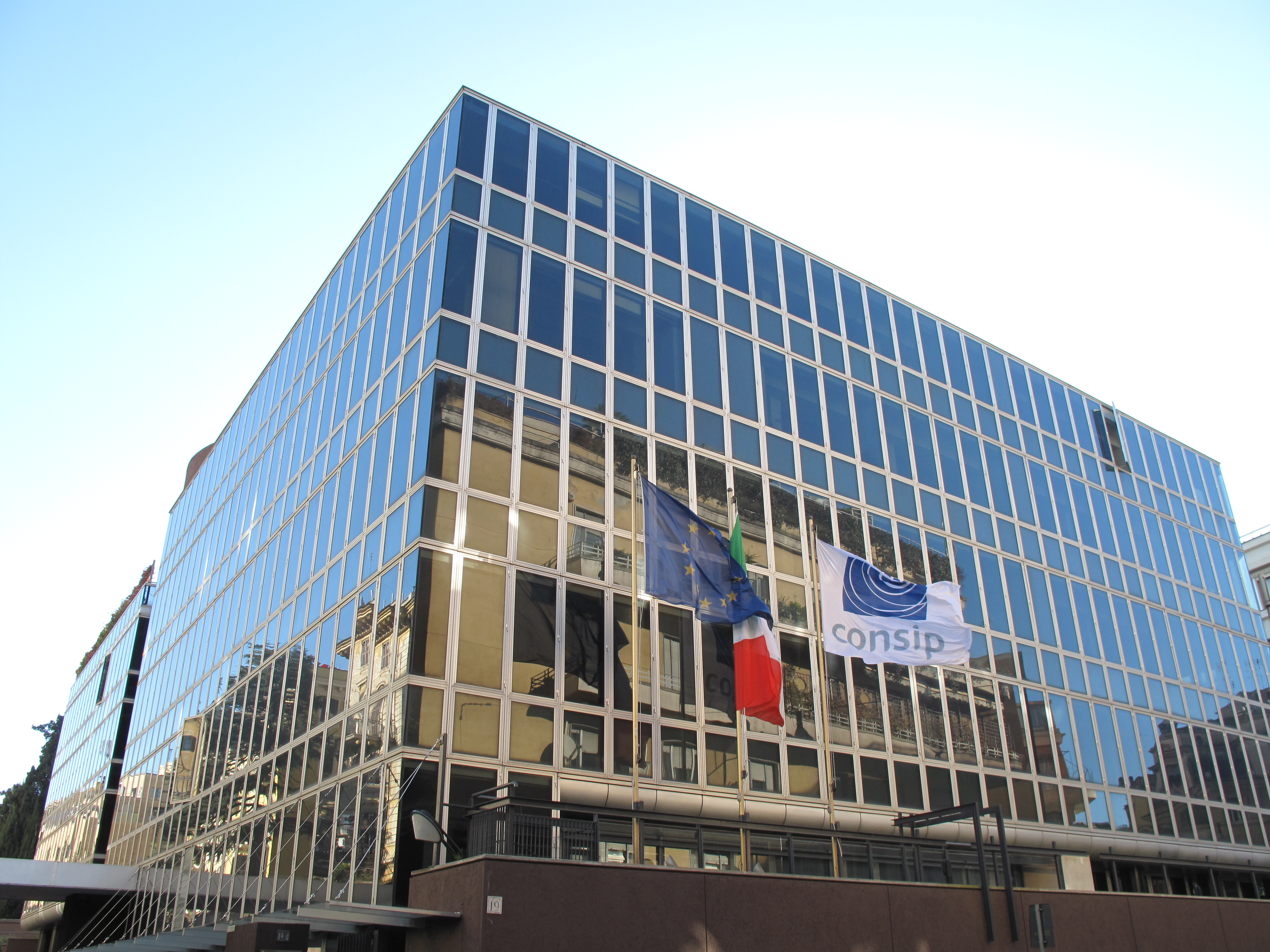
- Headquarters in Rome, Via Isonzo, 19D.
- Type: State-owned enterprise
- Industry: Public procurement
- Founded: 1997; 29 years ago
- Headquarters: Rome, Italy
- Area served: Italy
- Key people: Stefano Tomasini (Chairman), Marco Reggiani (CEO and general manager)
- Services: Public procurement services
- Revenue: €92.1 million (value of production) (2025)
- Net income: €3.7 million (2025)
- Owner: Ministry of Economy and Finance
- Number of employees: 444 (2025)
- Website: www.consip.it/en/

Consip is an Italian state-owned company that acts as the country's central purchasing body, providing frameworks, digital marketplaces and consultancy for the procurement of public goods and services. It was set up as a joint-stock company in 1997 and is wholly owned by Italy's Ministry of Economy and Finance (MEF), which is its sole shareholder.

Consip's stated aim is to make public purchasing more efficient, innovative and transparent by providing tools and skills to the public administration, while encouraging the competitive participation of businesses in public tenders. By the end of 2025, its digital procurement platform had brought together more than 290,000 companies (95% of them small and medium-sized) and 14,000 administrations, for about 880,000 contracts worth €31.9 billion.

Consip is a member of the Procurement G6, an informal group of national central purchasing bodies that use framework agreements and e-procurement tools. It holds ISO 9001:2015 quality certification for the design and development of procurement initiatives for the public administration, valid until October 2028.

== History ==
Consip, originally named CON.S.I.P. ("Concessionaria Servizi Informativi Pubblici"), was founded in 1997 to bring about changes in the IT management of the former Italian Ministry of the Treasury, Budget and Economic Planning.

Through Legislative Decree n. 414 of 19 November 1997, Consip was assigned ICT activities for Italy's national public administration in the areas of finance and accounting. Subsequently, through the decrees of the Ministry of the Treasury of 22 December 1997 and 17 June 1998, the company was put in charge of managing and developing ICT services for that ministry.

In 2000 Consip was assigned the "Programme for the rationalization of public administration purchases": in enforcing the 2000 budget law, the Ministerial Decree of 24 February 2000 put Consip in charge of assisting public administrations with their procurement of goods and services.

Today Consip operates as Italy's central purchasing body, supporting individual administrations and carrying out further tasks assigned through legal provisions or administrative acts.

In 2025, the first year of its 2025–2028 Industrial Plan, Consip published tenders worth more than €37.6 billion (+129% on 2024), and public administrations used its contracts and digital marketplaces for about €31.9 billion of purchases (+13%). The company reported an operating result of €3.3 million, a net profit of €3.7 million and investments of €8.6 million. In December 2025 Consip and the MEF's Department of General Administration signed a new agreement for the Purchasing Programme for 2026–2028, and a new 2026–2029 Industrial Plan was outlined.

== Main activities ==
Consip's activities cover three main areas:

- programmes for the requalification, efficiency and innovation of public spending: the Programme for the rationalisation of public administration purchases, the Plan for strategic acquisitions for digitalisation, and tenders for projects under the National Recovery and Resilience Plan (PNRR);
- procurement support for large administrations, covering needs analysis, sourcing strategy, the tender process and contract execution;
- optimisation and innovation projects for the MEF, including the management of state shareholdings, organisational processes, the register of statutory auditors, and the governance of EU policy interventions.

Its main tools include framework agreements, the public administration e-marketplace, dynamic purchasing systems and other digital procurement instruments.

== Methodology ==
Consip offers consultancy and project-design services, having developed technical, legal and project management skills. It is a competence centre specialised in all phases of the procurement value chain, supporting public administrations in both procurement planning and the purchasing phase with e-procurement tools, assistance and consultancy.

In 2025 Consip had 444 employees: 88% were university graduates, 56% were women and the average age was 49.

== Board of directors ==
Consip's board of directors chronology:

Period	Office and name	Notes
from 2024 (2024–2026 mandate)	Chairman (2024– ): Stefano Tomasini; Vice-chairman: Elena Comparato; CEO: Marco Reggiani	
2023–2024 (2023–2025 mandate)	Chairman (2023–2024): Barbara Luisi; CEO: Marco Mizzau	
2020–2023	Chairman (2023): Barbara Luisi; Chairman (2020–2023): Valeria Vaccaro; CEO: Cristiano Cannarsa	
2017–2020	Chairman (2018–2020): Renato Catalano; Chairman (2017–2018): Roberto Basso; CEO: Cristiano Cannarsa	
2015–2017 (2015–2018 mandate)	Chairman: Luigi Ferrara; CEO: Luigi Marroni	
2012–2015	Chairman (2014–2015): Luigi Ferrara; Chairman (2012–2014): Giuseppina Baffi; CEO: Domenico Casalino	
2011–2012 (2011–2014 mandate)	Chairman: Raffaele Ferrara; CEO: Domenico Casalino	
2008–2011	Chairman: Giovanni Catanzaro; Vice-chairman: Domenico Casalino; CEO: Danilo Broggi	
2005–2008	Chairman: Roberto Maria Radice; Vice-chairman: Giovanni Catanzaro; CEO (2006–2008): Danilo Broggi; CEO (2005–2006): Ferruccio Ferranti	
2002–2005	Chairman: Gustavo Piga; Vice-chairman: Stefano Scalera; CEO: Ferruccio Ferranti	
2001–2002 (2001–2004 mandate)	Chairman: Fortunato Cocco; CEO: Roberto Falavolti	
1998–2001	Chairman: Luigi Scimia; CEO: Roberto Falavolti	

== Acknowledgements ==
- Best Practice in Public Assets Award – 6th year, 2015
- European Energy Service Award – "Best European Energy Service Promoter", 2014
- Ambrogio Lorenzetti Award for Corporate Governance, 2014
- Best Practice in Public Assets Award – 6th year, 2012
- European eGovernment Award, 2009
- European Public Service Award, 2009
- Best Practice in Public Assets Award – 2nd year, 2008

== See also ==
- Government procurement in the European Union
- E-government
- E-procurement
- Public procurement
