= Government Complex, Daejeon =

Public service office complex in Daejeon, South Korea

Government Complex Daejeon
- Interactive map of the Government Complex Daejeon area

General information
- Status: Used as government buildings for some of Ministries of South Korea
- Type: Government office complex
- Location: 189, Cheongsa-Ro, Seo District, Daejeon, South Korea
- Coordinates: 36.361414°N 127.385015°E
- Cost: 416.1 billion won

Technical details
- Structural system: Reinforced concrete and steel

Korean name
- Hangul: 정부대전청사
- Hanja: 政府大田廳舍
- RR: Jeongbu Daejeon cheongsa
- MR: Chŏngbu Taejŏn ch'ŏngsa

The Government Complex Daejeon (Korean: 정부대전청사), which is located in Dunsan-dong, Seo-gu at the city of Daejeon, is a set of four buildings holding several government agencies of South Korea. The area of the Government Complex, Daejeon is 518,338 m^{2}. The size of the building is 4 buildings and auxiliary buildings with 20 stories high. The total floor area is also 242,701 m^{2}. The construction period is 1993.9.15 to 1997.12.20. Following is examples of government agencies using the Government Complex Daejeon.

- Korea Customs Service
- Public Procurement Service
- Cultural Heritage Administration
- National Statistical Office
- Korean Intellectual Property Office (KIPO)
- Korea Meteorological Administration
- Korea Forest Service
- Military Manpower Administration
- National Archives of Korea

== See also ==
- Government of South Korea
