= Sergio Fabbrini =

Italian political scientist (1949-)

Sergio Fabbrini (born 21 February 1949) is an Italian political scientist. He is Professor Emeritus of Political science and International relations at Libera Università Internazionale degli Studi Sociali Guido Carli in Rome, where he holds the Intesa Sanpaolo Chair on European Governance. He had also the Pierre Keller Visiting Professorship Chair at the Harvard University, Kennedy School of Government (2019/2020). He is the co-founder and former Director of the LUISS School of Government and former Head of the Luiss Political Science Department. He is also recurrent professor of Comparative Politics at the Institute of Governmental Studies at the University of California at Berkeley.

He contributed to build and then served as Director of the School of International Studies at University of Trento in the period 2006-2009. He was the Editor of the Italian Journal of Political Science (Rivista Italiana di Scienza Politica) in the period 2004-2009. He is also an editorialist for the Italian newspaper "Il Sole 24 ore". For his editorials, he was awarded the “Altiero Spinelli Prize 2017”.

== Background ==
Fabbrini was born in Pesaro. He did his undergraduate and graduate studies at the University of Trento, Italy. Starting his university studies in 1969, he took the four years degree in Sociology in 1973, graduating with laude with a dissertation on the role of the state in Italian post-second world war economic miracle. Because there was not yet a doctoral program in Italy in the 1970s, he got a three years scholarship (1974–1977), equivalent to a Ph.D. program, for specializing in political economy. His research concerned the place of the state and politics in the theories of classical political economists, thus published in the 1977 dissertation on “Thinking Over the Theory of Value of Classical Political Economists”.

He then got the equivalent of a four years post-doc fellowship (1977–1981) to investigate “The political economy of the welfare state”, researching at the Department of Economics, Cambridge University, United Kingdom and Department of Economics at Trento University. In the beginning of the 1980s, thanks to a NATO Fellowship and an Italian CNR Scholarship, he researched for three years at the University of California at Riverside and Berkeley. Since the beginning of the 1990s he has taught periodically at the University of California at Berkeley, Department of Political Science and Institute of Governmental Studies.

== Scholarly contributions ==
He has published twenty books, two co-authored books and twenty edited or co-edited books or journals’ special issues, and more than two hundred scientific articles and essays in seven languages in peer review journals on comparative and European government and politics, American government and politics, international relations and foreign policy, Italian government and politics, and political theory. According to a review in 2010:

In books and articles over the last decade, Sergio Fabbrini has been scrambling to understand the transformation of democracies in a transatlantic context. Anti-Americanism in Europe and anti-Europeanism in the United States, Fabbrini argues in America and Its Critics, have challenged the viability of NATO and, prior to Obama’s election, called into question the ability to cooperate on global concerns from terrorism to global warming. At the same time, Fabbrini has devoted several articles and an entire book, Compound Democracies, to the thesis that the United States and Europe are converging at an institutional level as examples of what he calls “compound democracies.” Over the long term, the two political systems are becoming more alike even as the politicians themselves, in the short term, articulate a different set of political values. More recently, he brought his comparative approach to investigate the European Union during crises, with the volumes: Which European Union: Europe After the Euro Crisis, Cambridge, Cambridge University Press, 2015; Europe’s Future: Decoupling and Reforming, Cambridge, Cambridge University Press, 2019; A Federalist Alternative for European Governance: The European Union in Hard Time, Cambridge, Cambridge University Press, 2025.

Regarding his main recent contributions: (1) he brought the analysis of the European Union (EU) back to the comparative framework; (2) he showed that the EU cannot be analyzed with the categories utilized for nation states; (3) he developed a more comprehensive distinction between national democracies on the basis of their functional logic and institutional structure; (4) he elaborated the original model of ‘compound democracy’ for explaining the functioning logic and the institutional structure of democratic unions of states (as the EU, but also the United States and Switzerland) that he defines as federal unions and not federal states, thus distinguishing between unions of states and nation states; (5) he defined an unprecedented model for understanding political leadership in contemporary governmental systems.

== Teaching ==
He was Pierre Keller Professor at the Harvard Kennedy School; Recuprrent Professor at the UC Berkeley; Jemolo Fellow at the Nuffield College, Oxford University. He was Jean Monnet Chair Professor at the Robert Schuman Center for Advanced Studies, European University Institute in Florence and Visiting Professor in the Department of Political and Social Sciences, European University Institute in Florence. He was Fulbright Assistant Professor at Harvard University in 1987-1988. He lectured, among others, in Canada (Carlton University), in Mexico (El Colegio de México, Mexico City), in Argentina (University of Buenos Aires and Universitad Abierta Interamericana), in Ecuador (Quito Simon Bolivar University), in China (Nanjing University), in Japan (Osaka University, Tokyo Imperial University and Sapporo University), in Thailand (Chulalongkorn University, Bangkok), in the Philippines (University of Philippines-Diliman, Manila) and in several US and European universities. At the LUISS School of Government he is the director of the Master in International Public Affairs, while teaching in other graduate courses offered by the School.

== Recognition ==
He won the 2017 “Spinelli Prize for political editorials on Europe”, the 2011 “Capalbio Prize for Europe”, the 2009 “Filippo Burzio Prize for the Political Sciences” and the 2006 “Amalfi European Prize for the Social Sciences”. He was awarded an honorary professorship by the Universidad Interamericana of Buenos Aires (Argentina). He was the Editor of the 9-volumes series on “The Institutions of Contemporary Democracies” for the Italian publisher G. Laterza. He is a referee for academic journals such as “American Political Science Review”, “Comparative Political Studies”, “Perspective on Politics”, “Political Behavior”, “European Journal of Political Research”, “West European Politics” and “European Political Science”. He was member of the Steering Committee of the European Consortium for Political Research (ECPR) Standing Group on European Union. He is currently a member of the executive board of the IPSA (International Political Science Association), Research Committee on "European Unification". He is member of several academic associations and organizations.

== Personal life ==
Married with Manuela Cescatti, they have two sons.

== Books by Fabbrini ==
=== In English and Spanish ===
- A Federalist Alternative for European Governance: The European Union in Hard Time, Cambridge, Cambridge University Press, 2025.
- Europe’s Future: Decoupling and Reforming, Cambridge, Cambridge University Press, 2019.
- Which European Union? Europe After the Euro Crisis, Cambridge, Cambridge University Press, 2015.
- ‘Institutions and Decision-Making in the EU’, in Ramona Coman, Amandine Crespy and Vivien Schmidt (eds.), Governance and Politics in the Post-Crisis European Union, Cambridge, Cambridge University Press, 2020, Chapter 3, pp. 54-73
- ‘The Governance of the European Union: Which Role for National Governments?’, in Jae-Jae Spoon and Nils Ringe (eds.), The European Union and Beyond: Multi-level Governance, Institutions, and Policy-Making, London, Rowman and Littlefield, ECPR Press, 2020, pp.233-252
- ‘Decoupling and Federalizing: Europe after the Multiple Crises’, in Mark Harwood, Stefan Moncada and Roderick Pace (eds.), The Future of the European Union: Demisting the Debate, University of Malta: The Institute of European Studies, 2020, pp. 28–41
- ‘Between power and influence: the European parliament in a dual constitutional regime’, in Edoardo Bressanelli and Nicola Chelotti (eds.), The European Parliament in Contested Union: Power and Influence Post-Lisbon, London, Routledge, 2020, pp
- Europe's Future, Decoupling and Reforming, Cambridge, Cambridge University Press, 2019
- (with Vivien Schmidt, eds.) ‘Imagining the Future of Europe: Between Multi-Speed Differentiation and Institutional Decopupling’, Special issue, Comparative European Politics, 17, n.2, 2019
- (with Raffaele Marchetti, eds.) Still a Western World? Continuity and Change in Global Order, London, Routledge, 2016.
- (with Uwe Puetter, eds.) ‘Integration Without Supranationalisation: The Central Role of the European Council in Post-Lisbon EU Politics’, Special issue, Journal of European Integration, 38, n. 5, 2016.
- Which European Union? Europe After the Euro Crisis, Cambridge, Cambridge University Press, 2015.
- (with Marc Lazar, eds.) The Italian elections: The electoral roots and the political consequences of the 24-25 February 2013 Italian elections, Special Issue, Contemporary Italian Politics, 5, n.2, July 2013
- Compound Democracies: Why the United States and Europe Are Becoming Similar, Oxford, New York, N.Y., Oxford University Press, paperback, 2010, revised and updated edition.
- El ascenso del Principe democratico. Quién gobierna y como se gobiernan las democracias, Buenos Aires, Fonde de Cultura Economica, 2009.
- America and Its Critics. Virtues and Vices of the Democratic Hyper-power. Cambridge, Polity Press, 2008.
- (with Michael Cox, eds.), The Transatlantic Relationship: The Marriage Without End?, Symposium in European Political Science, 10, n. 2, March 2011.
- (with Simona Piattoni, eds.), Italy in the European Union: Redefining National Interest in a Compound Polity, Lanham, Maryland, Rowman and Littlefield, 2008.
- (ed.), The United States Contested. American Unilateralism and European Discontent. London-New York, Routledge, 2006.
- (ed.), Democracy and Federalism in the European Union and the United States. Exploring Post-National Governance. London-New York, Routledge, 2005).
- (with Vincent Della Sala, eds.), Italian Politics: Italy between Europeanization and Domestic Politics. New York, N.Y. Oxford: Berghahn, 2004. p. 276. Italian Politics, vol. 19.
- (with Simona Piattoni, eds.), Italy in the EU: Pigmy or Giant? The role of Italian actors in the EU policy-making. Special issue of Modern Italy, 9, n.2, November 2004.
- (with Julio Echeverria, eds.), Gobernancia Global Y Bloques Regionales. Una perspectiva Comparada: Europa, América, Asia. Quito, Ecuador: Corporacion Editora Nacional, 2003.
- (ed.), Nation, Federalism and Democracy: The EU, Italy and the American Federal Experience. Bologna, Editrici Compositori, 2001.

=== In Italian ===
- Nazionalismo 2.0. La sfida sovranista all’Europa integrata, Milano, Mondadori Education, 2025.
- Cigni senza collo: lo sguardo breve delle democrazie tra Putin e Hamas, Milano, Il Sole 24 Ore, 2024.
- Democrazie sotto stress: Europa, Italia e America, Preface by Paolo Gentiloni, Milano, Il Sole 24 Ore, 2022.
- Politica Comparata. Introduzione alle Democrazie Contemporanee. Rome-Bari, Laterza, 2020 (9th ed., 1st ed. 2008).
- Prima l'Europa, Milano, Il Sole 24Ore, 2020
- Manuale di autodifesa europeista, Roma, Luiss University Press, 2019
- Sdoppiamento. Una prospettiva nuova per l’Europa, 2017, seconda edizione, Laterza;
- Addomesticare il Principe. Perché I leader contano e come controllarli, Venice, Marsilio, 2011
- Politica Comparata. Introduzione alle Democrazie Contemporanee. Roma-Bari, Laterza, 2008.
- L'America e i suoi critici. Virtù e vizi dell' iperpotenza democratica, Bologna: Mulino, 2005, 2° edizione 2006.
- Tra pressioni e veti. Il cambiamento politico in Italia. Roma-Bari, Laterza, 2000.
- Il Principe democratico. La leadership nelle democrazie contemporanee, Roma-Bari, Laterza, 1999.
- Le regole della democrazia. Guida alle riforme. Roma-Bari, Laterza, 1997.
- Quale democrazia. L'Italia e gli altri. Roma-Bari, Laterza, 1994, 1998 (2nd ed.), 1999 (3rd ed.).
- Il presidenzialismo degli Stati Uniti. Roma-Bari, Laterza, 1993.
- Politica e mutamenti sociali. Alternative a confronto sullo stato sociale. Bologna, Il Mulino, 1988.
- Neoconservatorismo e politica americana. Attori e processi politici in una società in trasformazione. Bologna, Il Mulino, 1986.
- (with Salvatore Vassallo), Il governo. Gli esecutivi delle democrazie contemporanee. Roma-Bari, Laterza, 1999, 2002 (2nd ed).
- (with Vincenzo Lippolis and Giulio M. Salerno, eds.), Governare le democrazie. Esecutivi, leader e sfide, special issue of Il Filangieri, Quaderno 2010.
- (ed.), L’europeizzazione dell’Italia. L’impatto dell’Unione Europea sulle istituzioni e le politiche italiane. Roma-Bari, Laterza, 2003.
- (ed.), L'Unione Europea. Le istituzioni e gli attori di un sistema sovranazionale. Roma-Bari, Laterza, 2002, p. 373.
- (with Francesc Morata, eds.), L'Unione Europea: le Politiche Pubbliche. Roma-Bari, Laterza, 2002.
- (ed.), Robert A. Dahl: Politica e virtù. La teoria democratica del nuovo secolo. Roma-Bari, Laterza, 2001.
- (with Giuseppe Di Palma and Giorgio Freddi, eds.), Condannata al successo? L’Italia nell’ Europa integrata. Bologna, Il Mulino, 2000.
