= LUISS School of Government =

Graduate school of LUISS Guido Carli University

The Luiss School of Government - Luiss SoG is a graduate school of the Luiss University in Rome, Italy.

Modelled on Harvard’s Harvard Kennedy School, the Luiss SoG was founded in February 2010 and inaugurated at the presence of the President of the Republic Giorgio Napolitano; its aim is that of providing graduate training for ‘high-level public and private officials who handle political and government decision-making processes’, both at national and international level.

The President of Luiss SoG is Nando Pagnoncelli.

Since the very beginning, the Luiss SoG has had as main goal the internationalization of its academic teaching, that is why the academic body of the School is composed not only of Italian experts but also by international academics and professionals, such as Giuliano Amato, Anthony Atkinson, Franco Bassanini, Yves Mény, Sabino Cassese, Michael Cox, Roberto D'Alimonte, Giulio Napolitano, Sergio Fabbrini, Marc Lazar, Leonardo Morlino, Raffaele Cantone, Marcello Messori, Christian Egenhofer, and Massimo Egidi.

The Luiss SoG offers both I level Master Courses (attendable after a Bachelor) and II level Master Courses (attendable after a 5-year academic programme); two Summer Schools and a wide range of Executive Courses enrich the academic offering of the School.

== Research ==
Among the objectives of the Luiss SoG a special place is reserved to high quality research. In January 2013 a series of "working papers" were inaugurated; research projects include:

- Beyond European Exceptionalism: The European Union in Comparative Perspective (EACEA Jean Monnet Chair 2011-2014, Project Leader: Prof. Sergio Fabbrini, Director Luiss SoG)
- The Human Right Dimension of EU Foreign Policy (EACEA Jean Monnet Chair, Project Leader: Prof. Leonardo Morlino, Professor of Political Science and Vice Rector-Research LUISS Guido Carli University)
- Jean Monnet Module on Parliamentary Democracy in Europe (Prof. Nicola Lupo)
- Jean Monnet Module on EU’s Engagement with Civil Society (Raffaele Marchetti)

Luiss SoG organizes several workshops, seminars and international conferences, with a high level academic content and of national and international interest, such as the Yearly International Conference on "Investing in the Age of Political Risk" on 14 December 2012, the "Workshop on Civil Society and Global Politics" on 12 October 2012, the Presentation of the "International Encyclopedia of Political Science" on 26 September 2012 with the presence of national and international guests such as Giuseppe Scognamiglio, Lawrence Rosenthal, Renaud Dehousse, John Zysman, Angelo Panebianco and Gaetano Quagliarello.
