= Gustavo Piga =

Gustavo Piga (18 February 1964), is an Italian economist. He is professor of Political economy at University of Rome Tor Vergata.

In 1996 attained the PhD in Economics at Columbia University. In 1997-98 taught accounting and finance at the Department of Economics of Columbia University. He wrote the "Derivatives in Public Debt Management" in 2001. He edited Revisiting Keynes with Lorenzo Pecchi for MIT Press and the "Handbook of Procurement" with Nicola Dimitri and Giancarlo Spagnolo for Cambridge University Press. In 2002-2005 he was the president of Consip. He is currently member of the Scientific Committee of the Italian Congressional Budget Office and Director of the Global Governance Undergraduate degree.

== Works ==
- Approfondimenti di economia politica, Roma, La Sapienza, 1996
- Who's afraid of index-linked bonds?, with Lorenzo Pecchi, Roma, Università degli studi La Sapienza, 1996
- On the sources of the inflationary-bias and output variability, Roma, Università Luiss Guido Carli, 1999
- The link between the size and the management of public debt: the role of bond ownership in the italian case, with Giorgio Valente, Roma, Universita Luiss Guido Caarli, 1999
- Capital accumulation, productivity and growth: monitoring Italy 2005, with Marco Malgarini, Basingstoke; New York: Palgrave
- Lezioni di microeconomia, Torino, Giappichelli, [2008]
- Budget rules versus budget flexibility: a political equilibrium approach, Roma, Università Luiss, 1994
- EMU and public debt management: one money, one debt?, with Carlo Favero, Alessandro Missale
- The politics of index-linked bonds, with Lorenzo Pecchi, Roma: Università Luiss Guido Carli, 1997
- Managing public debt: index-linked bonds in theory and practice, with Marcello De Cecco, Lorenzo Pecchi, Cheltenham, UK, Brookfield, US, Elgar, 1997
- Public debt management in the European monetary union, Roma, Università Luiss Guido Carli, 1999
- Handbook of procurement, with Nicola Dimitri, Giancarlo Spagnolo, Cambridge, Cambridge University Press, 2006
- Regole per il mercato, with Mario Baldassarri, Giampaolo Galli, Milano, Il Sole 24 ore, 2002
- L' esternalizzazione dei processi gestionali: l'impatto sulle imprese e le prospettive per il Sistema Italia, with Corrado Cerruti, Riccardo Pacini, Il Sole 24 ore, 2008
- Approfondimenti di economia politica, Roma, Euroma, stampa 1998
- Understanding the high interest rates on Italian government securities, with Alberto Giovannini, Roma, Luiss University, 1992
- The Italian term structure of interest rates and the government issuance policy, with Giorgio Valente, Roma, Luiss edizioni, 2001
- In search of an independent province for the treasuries: how should governments announce debt issues?, Roma, Università degli studi La Sapienza, 1995
- Esercizi di economia politica with Valerio Crispolti, Roma, NIS, 1997
- The economics of public procurement, with Khi V. Thai, Basingstoke; New York, Palgrave Macmillan, 2007
- Il ventunesimo secolo di Keynes. Economia e società per le nuove generazioni, with Lorenzo Pecchi, Roma, Luiss University Press, 2011
