= Marc Lazar =

French academic (born 1952)

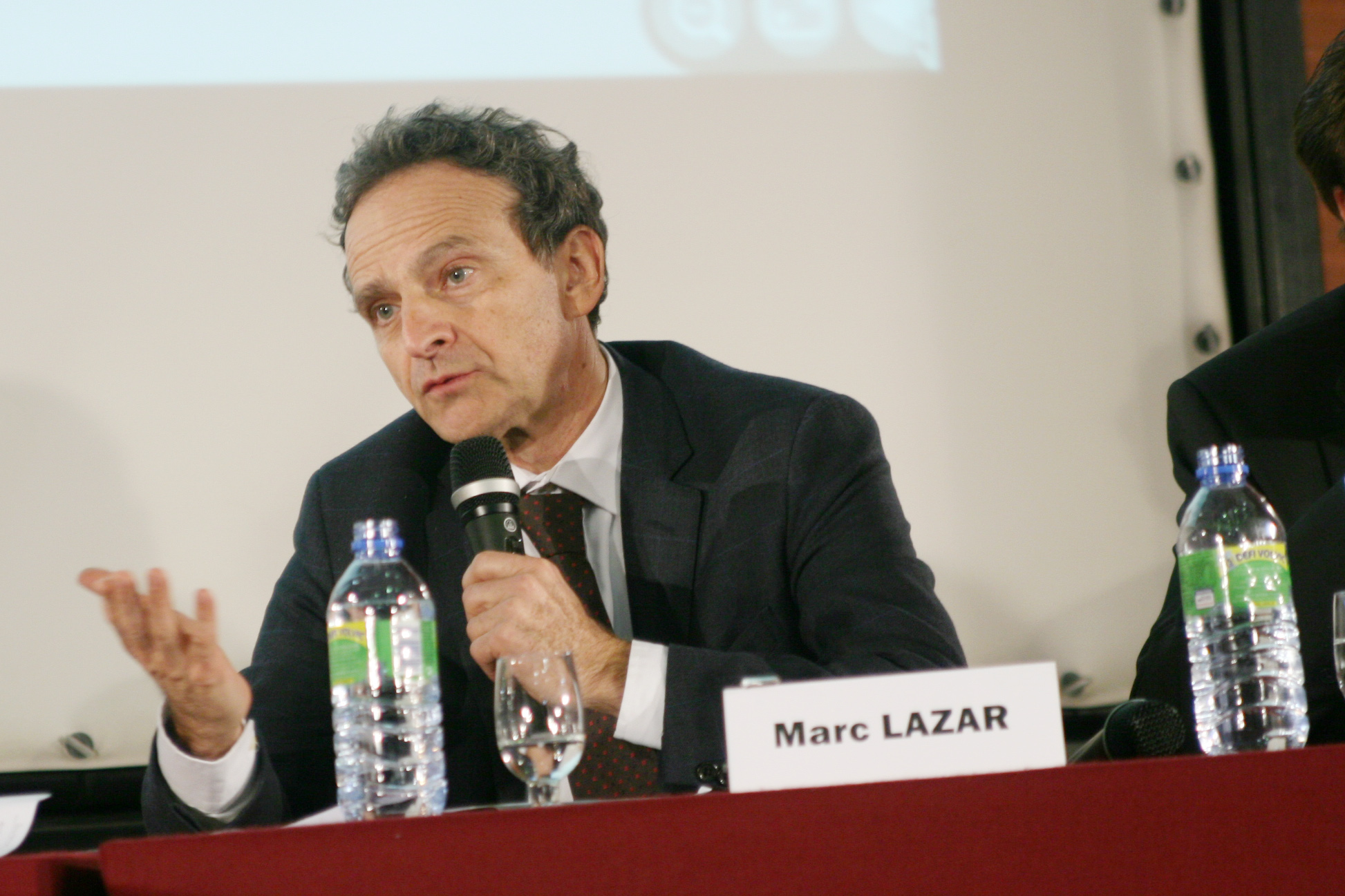
Lazar in 2009

Marc Lazar (born 19 June 1952) is a French academic who served as a professor of history and dean of the Doctoral School at the Paris Institute of Political Studies (better known as Sciences Po). He was also the president of the LUISS school of government in Rome. He managed a research group on contemporary Italy with the International Research Center (Centre de recherches internationales, CERI). He is a specialist of the History of left-wing politics and parties, and of Italian politics. He graduated from the School for Advanced Studies in the Social Sciences (EHESS).

== Career ==
Born in Paris, Lazar taught as an associate of history in public schools. After completing his Ph.D. in history, he has been Jean Monnet fellow at the European University Institute as member of the department of History and of the department of Political Science. He has been researcher at the CNRS, in political science at the Centre for Comparative Analysis of Political Systems (Centre d'Analyse Comparative des Systèmes Politiques, CASCSP), University of Paris I (1987−1989), lecturer in political science at the University of Paris I (1989−1993), lecturer at Sciences Po (1990−1999), and associate professor at Stanford University, Program Stanford in Paris (1994−2005).

After his role as CNRS Permanent Researcher HDR, Lazar has been professor of political sociology (1993−1999) at University Paris X, and then professor of political history and sociology at Sciences Po since 1999. He has been visiting professor at Luiss-Guido Carli University in Rome (2007−2014). He is also a member of the editorial board of the French literary magazine Esprit, columnist for the Italian newspaper La Repubblica, and regular collaborator of French newspapers Le Monde, Libération, and Le Figaro, and French television and radio, such as France 2, France 3, Radio-France, and Europe 1, and the Italian television RAI.
