= Giovanni Lo Storto =

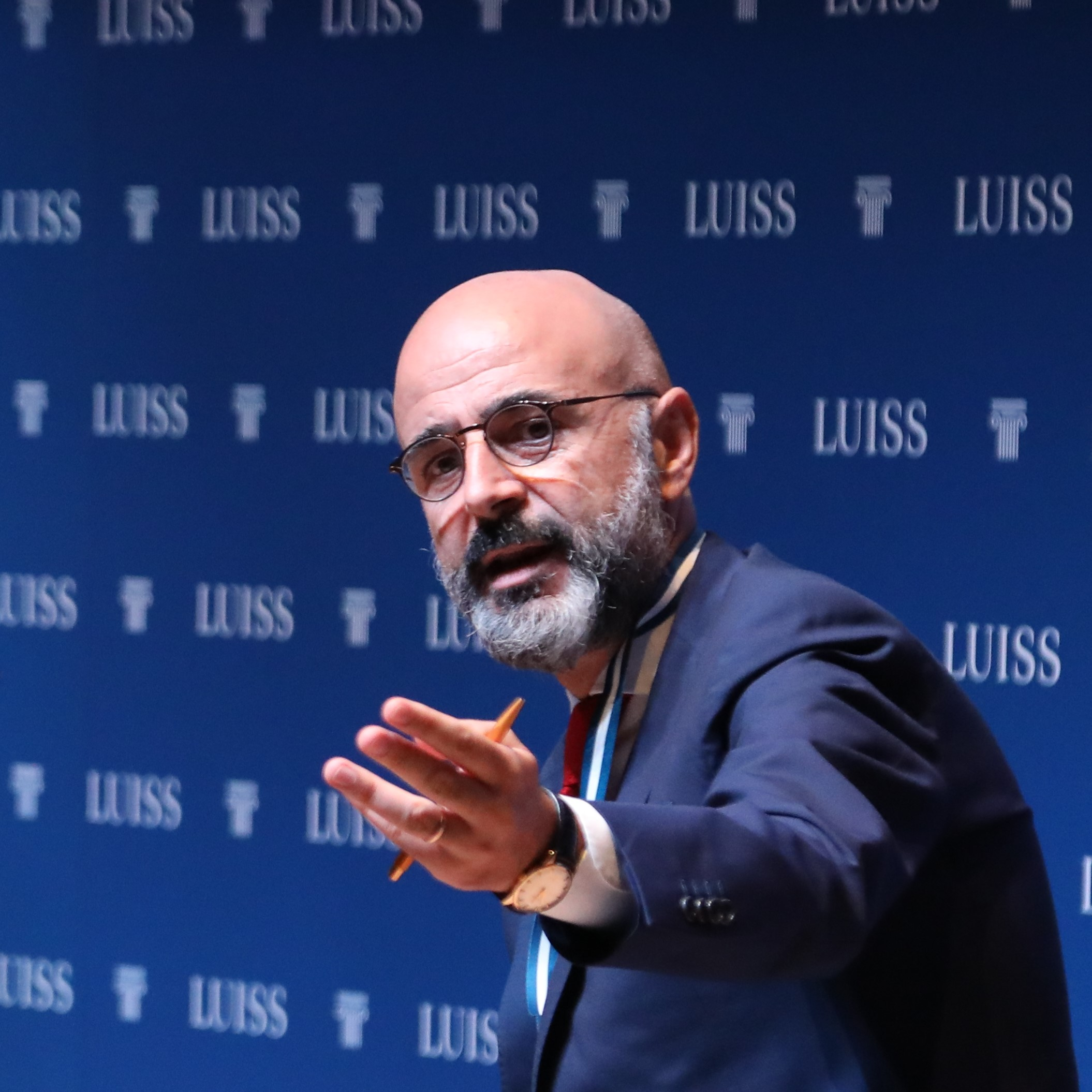
- Born: 1970 (age 55–56)
- Occupation: General manager of Luiss Guido Carli University

Giovanni Lo Storto (born 1970 in Troia, Italy) was the General Manager of Luiss Guido Carli University from 2013 to 2024.

== Biography ==
After graduating in Economics at Luiss Guido Carli University (1994) with a thesis on insurance, from 1995 to 1997 he served as an Administrative Official in the Italian Army. After this experience, he came back to Luiss University working at first as an assistant professor and subject matter expert, and later as an adjunct professor in Economics and Management of Insurance Companies. Between 1997 and 1999, in addition to his academic activity, he worked on alternative risk transfer analysis at the Italian Reinsurance Union, which later became Swiss Re. In 2002 he took on the role of Branch Manager in Bartolini. Starting from 2003, he began to hold positions of increasing responsibility at Luiss University: from working as a Controller to holding the position of Deputy Director. In 2013 he became General Manager of the University. In 2024 left Luiss.

== Other positions ==
Giovanni Lo Storto holds or has held the following positions:

- Independent Board Member, member of the Committee for Control, Risk, Sustainability and Corporate Governance, and member of the Remuneration Committee of Pirelli & C. S.p.A. (from May 2018)
- Independent Board Member and President of the Committee for Risks of doValue S.p.A. (2015)
- CEO of L.Lab Srl.
- Member of the Board of Administration for “Internazionale” magazine
- Member of the Board of Administration for “Formiche” magazine
- Executive Vice President and Member of the Board of Administration for LA4G
- Member of the Board of Administration for the Gerardo Capriglione, and Bruno Visentini Foundations
- Vice President of Pola Srl
- Delegate Advisor for L.Campus SRL
- Co-founder of the accelerator LuissEnlabs
- Executive Vice President and Member of the Board of Administration for LA4G

== Awards ==
During his career, Giovanni Lo Storto received the following prizes: International Prize Icaro Daunia (2006), the Prize Argos Hippium (2008), and the literary special Prize “Nicola Zingarelli” (2012). In 2014 he received the Prize Guido Carli, bestowed under the High Patronage of the President of the Italian Republic.

== Honors ==

Cavaliere Ordine al Merito della Repubblica Italiana:(2010)

Ufficiale Ordine al Merito della Repubblica Italiana:(2017)

== Bibliography ==
- Giovanni Lo Storto, Leonardo Previ (2014). Jugaad Innovation. Rubettino. ISBN 9788849840544.
- Giovanni Lo Storto, Leonardo Previ (2016). Frugal innovation. Come fare di più con meno. Rubettino. ISBN 9788849848939.
- Giovanni Lo Storto (2017). EroStudente - Il desiderio di prendere il largo. Rubettino. ISBN 9788849850222.
