= Mario Furore =

Italian politician (born 1988)

Mario Furore MEP
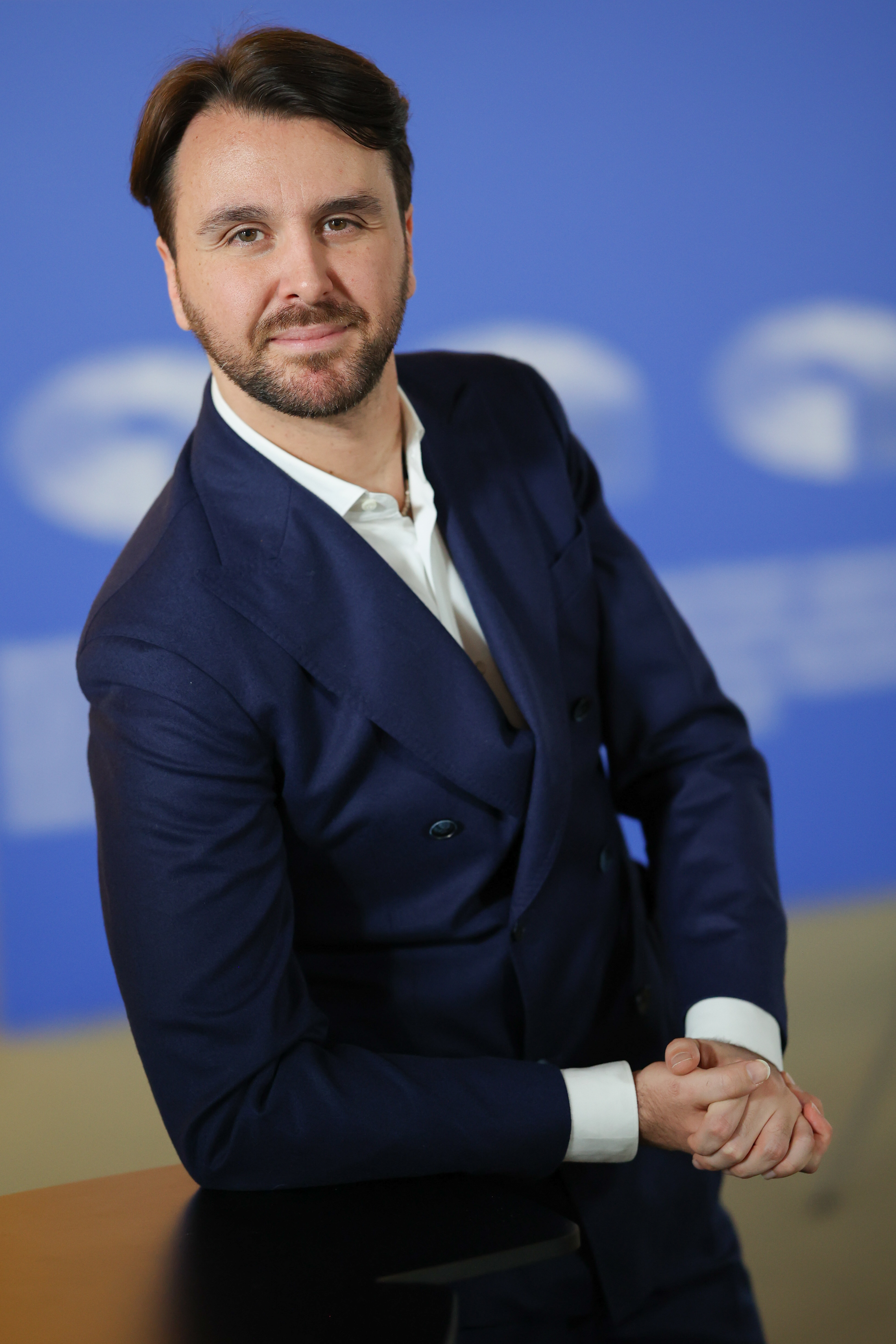

Member of the European Parliament for Southern Italy
- Incumbent
- Assumed office 2 July 2019

Personal details
- Born: 25 December 1988 (age 37) Foggia, Italy
- Party: Five Star Movement
- Education: Luiss Guido Carli

Mario Furore (born 25 December 1988) is an Italian politician. Born in Foggia, Furore was elected as a MEP in the 2019 European Parliament election in Italy.
