= Dario Antiseri =

Italian philosopher and academic (1940–2026)

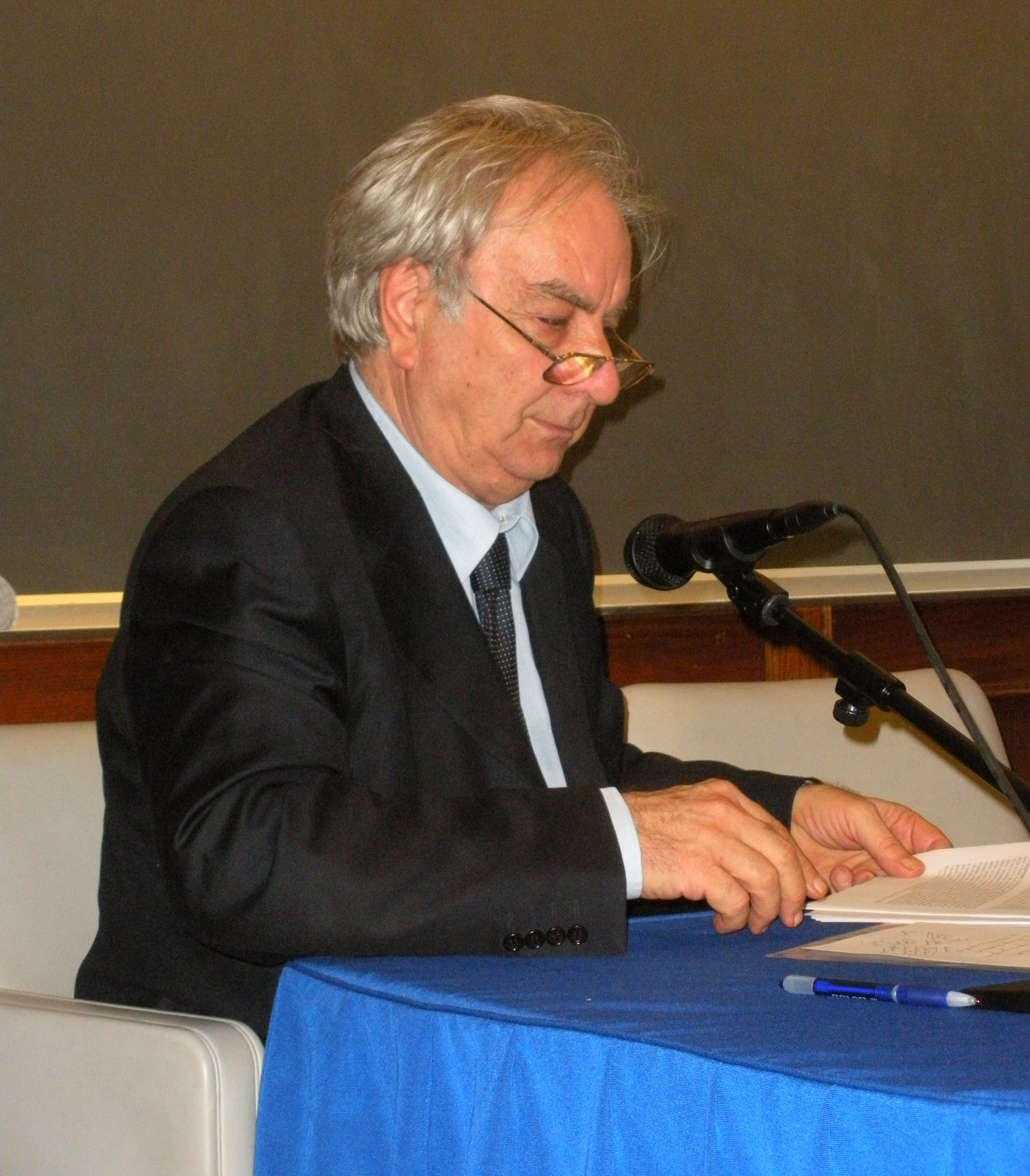
Antiseri in 2009

Dario Antiseri (9 January 1940 – 11 February 2026) was an Italian philosopher and academic. He held a bachelor's degree (summa cum laude) in Philosophy from the University of Perugia and for many years he was Full Professor of Methodology of the Social Sciences at LUISS, in Rome. He taught in Siena, Padova and Rome, where he was also the Dean of the Faculty of Political Science. He retired from academia in 2010. He was an important scholar of Karl R. Popper and Hans-Georg Gadamer, and in many works he tried to show the links between fallibilism and hermeneutics. In 1996, he published a book about Gianni Vattimo's weak thought. With the Italian philosopher Giovanni Reale, he also authored an important treatise of philosophy in three volumes, which is the most widely used philosophy textbook in Italian schools. Antiseri died on 11 February 2026, at the age of 86.

== Selected publications ==
- G. Reale - D. Antiseri, Il pensiero occidentale dalle origini ad oggi (La Scuola: Brescia, 1980; 45th ed. 2004). This work has been translated into Spanish, Portuguese and Russian.
