= Fulvio Conti =

Italian businessman

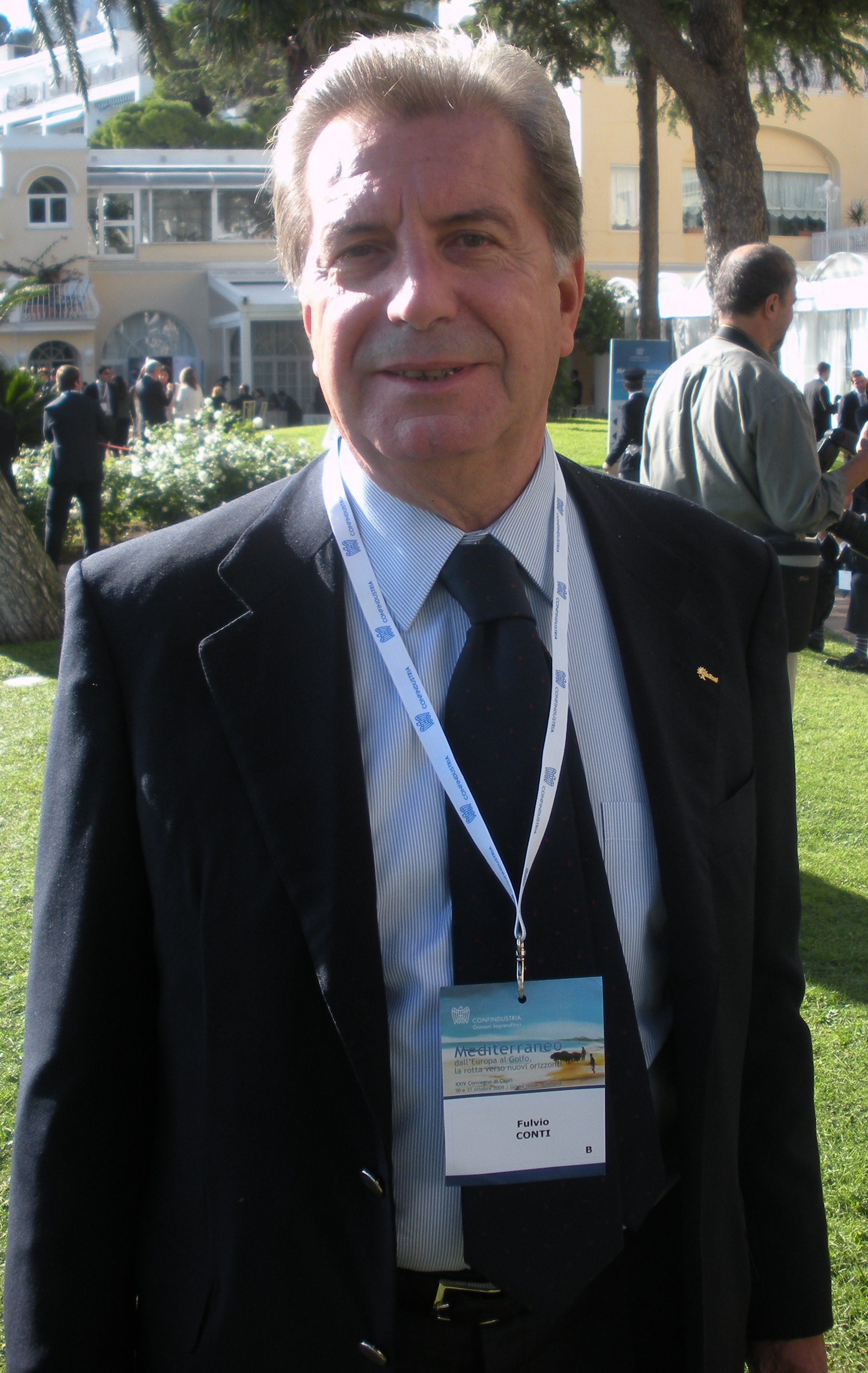
- Fulvio Conti in 2009
- Born: 28 October 1947 (age 78); Rome, Italy
- Education: La Sapienza University, Rome
- Occupation: Italian financier

Fulvio Conti (born 28 October 1947) is an Italian financier. He was Chief Executive Officer and General Manager of Italy's largest power company, Enel.

Conti joined Enel in 1999 as Chief Financial Officer. As CEO, he finalized the acquisition of the Slovak utility, Slovenkse Elektrarne, and managed the takeover of Endesa, the leading power company in Spain and Latin America, as well as the takeover of the Russian power company OGK 5.

== Early life and education ==
Conti has a degree in Economics from La Sapienza University, Rome.

== Career ==
Conti started his career at Mobil Oil, where in 1989 he was appointed Chief Financial Officer at Mobil Oil Europe in London. In 1991, he headed Administration, Finance and Control for Europe at the American company Campbell.

One year later, Conti came back to Italy as Chief Financial Officer at Montecatini, and in 1993, he joined the parent company Montedison-Compart. In 1996, he was appointed General Director and Chief Financial Officer at Ferrovie dello Stato, the Italian Railways company.

In 1998, he joined Telecom Italia as General Director and Board Member of TIM and other major companies of the group. He also held the position of Chief Financial Officer.

In 2007, he was awarded the Doctor Honoris Causa degree in Electrical Engineering from Genoa University.

He is a lecturer of Corporate Finance at the MBA, School of Economics of the LUISS University, Rome.

In May 2009, Conti was appointed “Cavaliere del Lavoro” of the Italian Republic. In December of the same year, he became “Officier de la Légion d’Honneur” of the French Republic.

He is on the Board of Directors of the UK financial services Group Barclays plc, the US insurance Group AON and the National Academy of Santa Cecilia. He is Chairman of Eurelectric and Deputy Chairman of Endesa.

Conti was the CEO and General Director of Enel from May 2005 until May 2014.
