= Procurement G6 =

Group of six central procurement bodies

The Procurement G6 is an informal group of six national central purchasing bodies. It is also known as the Multilateral Meeting on Government Procurement (MMGP).

== History ==
Past meetings of the Procurement G6 have included:

- June 15–16, 2009 — San Antonio, USA
- June 10–12, 2010 – Rome, ITA
- September 24–26, 2013 — Seoul, KOR
- May 24–25, 2016 – Rome, ITA
- October 10–11, 2018 — Vancouver, CAN
- April 16, 2024 — Seoul, KOR

== Members ==
Members of the Procurement G6 are:

- Canada: Public Services and Procurement Canada
- Chile: ChileCompra
- Italy: Consip
- South Korea: Public Procurement Service
- United Kingdom: Crown Commercial Service
- United States: General Services Administration

== Scope ==
Each countries national procurement body shares experiences about:

- e–procurement systems
- challenges, opportunities and actions for small and medium enterprises (SMEs)
- their qualification systems for enterprises
- instruments and indicators for the performance measurement of the Central Purchasing Bodies and their impact on the economic system, on the public sector and on the enterprises
- actions to minimize the risk of corruption
- the green procurement scenarios

== See also ==
- Agreement on Government Procurement
- Auction
- E–procurement
- Expediting
- Global sourcing
- Group purchasing organization
- Purchasing
- Strategic sourcing
