= Public Prosecution Service =

Public Prosecution Service may refer to:

== Organisations ==
- Public Prosecution Service for Northern Ireland
- Public Prosecution Service of Canada
- Public Prosecution Service (Indonesia)
- Public Prosecution Service (Netherlands)
- Public Prosecution Service (Portugal)

== Cases ==
- Public Prosecution Service of Northern Ireland v. Liam Adams
- The Public Prosecution Service v William Elliott, Robert McKee

== See also ==
- Prosecutor
