= LUISS Business School =

Business school in Rome, Italy

Luiss Business School
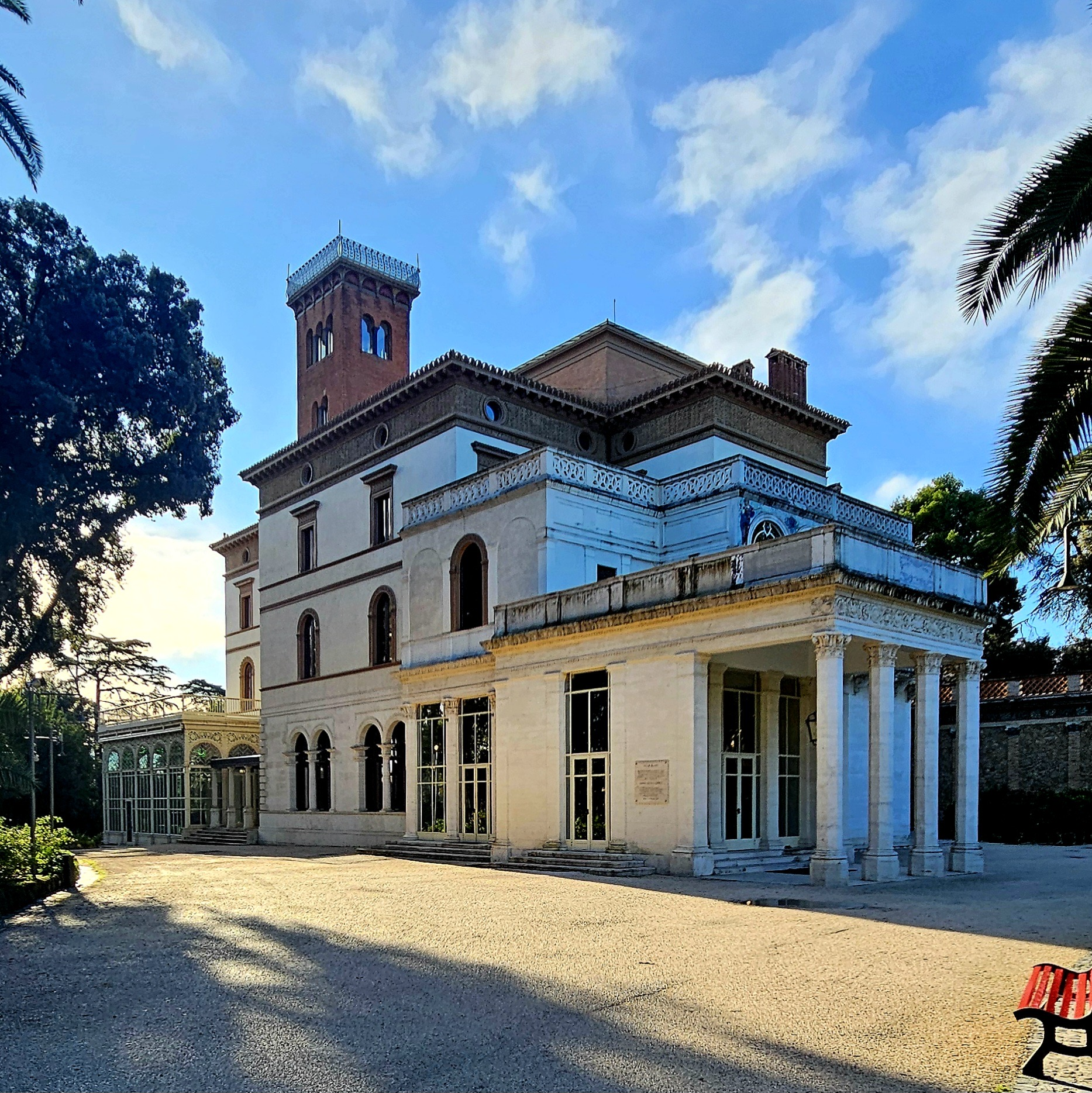
- Type: Private business school
- Established: 1986
- Parent institution: Luiss University
- Accreditation: Triple accreditation
- Director: Raffaele Oriani
- Location: Rome; Milan; Belluno; Amsterdam; Dubai
- Website: businessschool.luiss.it/en/

Luiss Business School is an Italian business school situated in Rome, specializing in business and management studies.

Founded in 1986, Luiss Business School is the business school of the Luiss University. Its educational portfolio includes Masters, MBAs, Executive Programmes and Custom Programmes.

The main campus is located in the historical 19th century Villa Blanc building, in Rome. In 2018, a second campus has been opened in Milan, in 2019, a third campus has been opened in Belluno, the most important city in the Eastern Dolomites, and in 2020, a fourth campus has been opened in Amsterdam.

Luiss Business School Amsterdam Hub opened its doors in 2020 as the first international hub of the long-established Italian private higher education institution.

In 2024, the second international hub kicked off activities in Dubai.

Luiss Business School is accredited by AACSB, AMBA and EQUIS.

== History ==
Luiss Business School was founded in 1986 as Luiss School of Management, as the university division dedicated to post-graduate training. In 1991, the first Master of business administration was established, followed in 1995 by the first programme of doctoral degrees in business administration, corporate finance, organisation and human resources.

In 2006, the school assumed its current name and established a partnership program with Fudan University School of Management. The following year, the four doctoral courses were brought together in a single course, completely in English.

In 2013, the Luiss Business School was included in the new Luiss School of Business & Management educational area, together with the Luiss Business & Management Department. In 2015, it obtained the EQUIS accreditation, becoming the third Italian university to obtain this accreditation.

In 2016, the reorganisation of the educational area was completed, with the merging of the Business School and Business & Management Department activities in the new "Luiss Business School". Starting from 9 January 2017, the School moved to its new seat, the recently renovated 19th-century Villa Blanc.

In 2020, Luiss Business School obtained the AMBA accreditation, becoming the fourth Italian university to obtain this accreditation.

On 27 July 2023, Luiss Business School received the AACSB accreditation, joining a selected group of triple-accredited business schools worldwide.

== Training offer ==
The School's training offer comprises an undergraduate course in Economy and Management, four MA courses (three in Italian and one in English) and several other post-graduate, MBAs, masters and doctorate courses, both in Italian and in English.

== See also ==
- Luiss University
- LUISS School of Government
