= Italian Society for International Organizations =

Italian organization concerning international relations

SIOI
- Founded: 1944
- Headquarters: Rome, Italy
- Area served: Worldwide
- Key people: Franco Frattini (president)

The Italian Society for International Organization or SIOI (Società Italiana Organizzazione Internazionale) is a non-profit organization operating under the supervision of the Italian Ministry of Foreign Affairs. It was founded in 1944 with the support of prime minister Alcide De Gasperi.

It nowadays represents one of the leading societies for international relations, cooperation and liaison with the leading international organizations. The current president is Franco Frattini, former Italian Minister of Foreign Affairs. The foundation is also a top-flight institution in the school of government and in the education of international executives and diplomats addressed to the European Union, the United Nations and the other important international institutions and organizations.

Since 2012, its president has been Franco Frattini, he is the first politician to hold a position until now reserved for high-level diplomats.

== Activity ==
It is the Italian Association for the United Nations (UNA Italy), a founding member of the ‘World Federation of the United Nations Associations’ (WFUNA) and an active member of the ‘International Forum on Diplomatic Training’ (IFDT) in Vienna SIOI organizes debates and meetings over the great international themes. Its library holds many of the historical archives belonging to the United Nations and the League of Nations quarters in the cities of New York City, Geneva and Vienna.

Since 1946 SIOI is member of the International Union of Diplomatic Academies of Vienna.

SIOI also publishes a quarterly magazine named "La Comunità Internazionale" dedicated to discussing issues of international relations and international law.
