= Massimo Egidi =

Italian economist (born 1942)

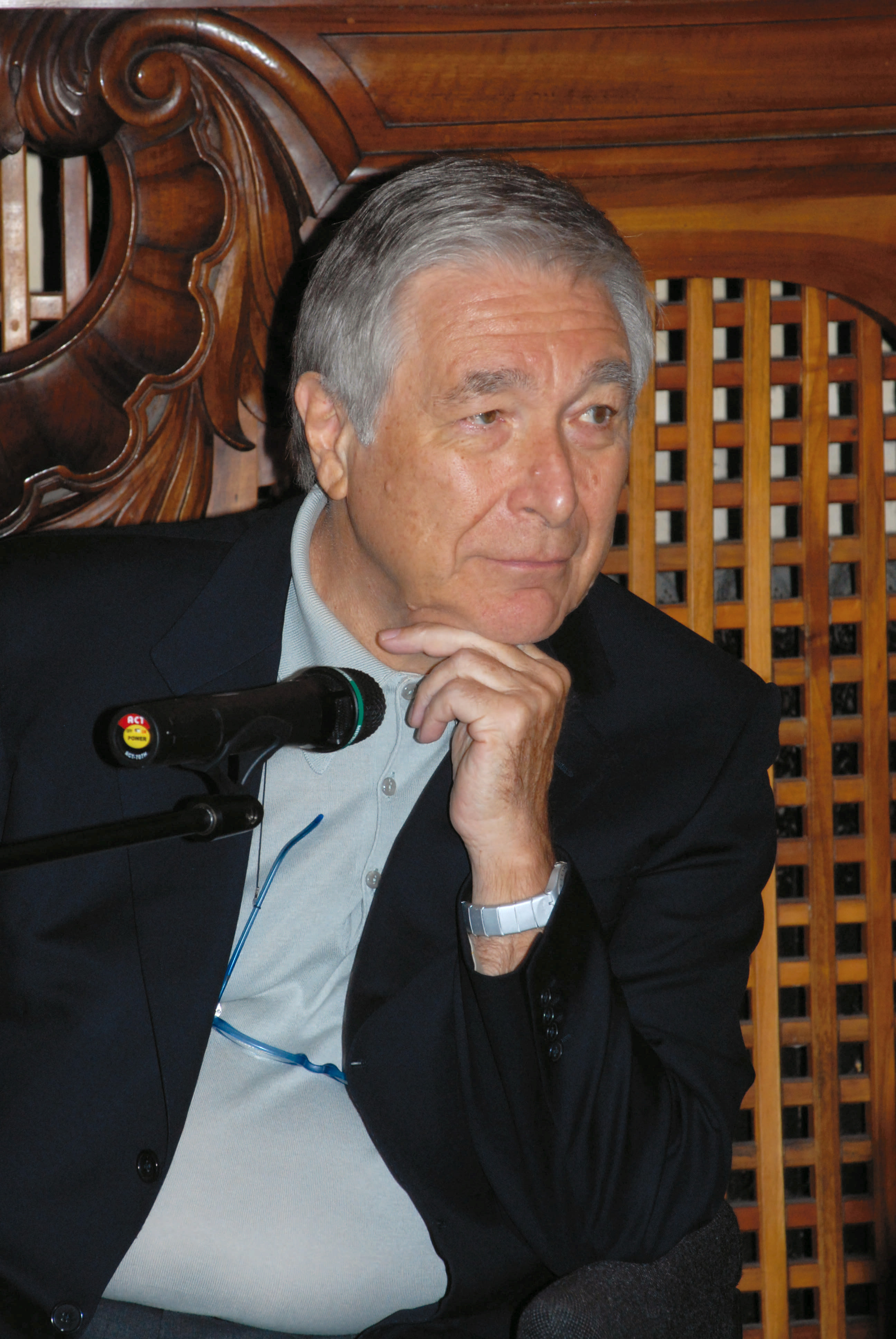
- Born: 1 December 1942 (age 83); Turin, Italy

Academic background
- Education: University of Turin, Italy
- Influences: S.Rizzello, M.C. Becker

Academic work
- Discipline: Behavioral economics, Experimental economics, Game theory, Education, University governance
- Institutions: Luiss University, Rome, Italy
- Notable ideas: Routines and biases in organizational behavior, problem solving

Massimo Egidi (born 1 December 1942) is an Italian economist. He is Professor of Economics at Libera Università Internazionale degli Studi Sociali Guido Carli in Rome and former rector of the university. With the late Axel Leijonhufvud, he was co-director of CELL, the Laboratory of Computable and Experimental Economics at the University of Trento. His main research interests are related to the study of boundedly rational behaviors in organizations and institutions.

== Career ==
Born in Turin, Egidi is a professor at Libera Università Internazionale degli Studi Sociali Guido Carli in Rome, where he served as rector from 2006 until 2016, after being rector of the University of Trento from 1996 to 2004. His academic career started at the Polytechnic of Turin, continuing at the Faculty of Political Sciences (1965–1986) at the University of Trento (1987–2001), and then at Rome-based Libera Università Internazionale degli Studi Sociali Guido Carli (since 2005). In addition to his academic position, he was also chairman of the Bruno Kessler Foundation of Trento until 2014

Egidi was visiting fellow at the Washington University in St. Louis (1975), visiting professor at the Center for Research on Management at the Graduate Business School of the University of California, Berkeley (1993), and visiting scholar at the International Institute for Applied Systems Analysis (1994), at Stanford University (2003), at the Santa Fe Institute, and at the École Politecnique, the École Normale Supérieure, and the Collège de France in Paris. He is co-chairman with Jean Paul Fitoussi of the Herbert Simon Society and is founder and director, with Axel Leijonhufvud, of the Laboratory of Experimental and Computational Economics (CEEL, Trento).

Egidi is a member of various scientific and academic committees, including the Scientific Committee of ESNIE – European School on New Institutional Economics, the Université de Paris X, and of the Doctorate in Economics at Sciences Po (Paris). He is associate editor of a number of Italian and foreign journals, including Industrial and Corporate Change and Mind and Society. He was responsible for the National Research Programme in the sector of Economics and Social Sciences 2009–2013. He is a member by right of the Scientific Committee of Confindustria.

Egidi participated in the activities of the European University Association (EUA), which performs a leader role in the creation of a European space for research and training. He was the representative of the conference of Italian rectors in the EUA, authorized to speak on issues of university governance, the relationship between industry and research, technology transfer, and research and innovation policies. Following his participation in European debate on the reform of university system ("Bologna process"), he was the author of publications in the field of Higher Education policies. He is also a member of the UFI – Université Franco-Italienne, and was a founding member of the AIT – Ateneo Italo Tedesco, holding the chairmanship until 2012.

== Work ==
His work focuses on topics such as behavioural economics, theory of organisation and organisational learning, and theory of decisions, under the umbrella of the scientific approach developed by Herbert A. Simon (Nobel Prize 1980) from the 1950s onwards, which today is summarized as the bounded rationality approach. He serves as rector at LUISS University in Rome. A parallel line is represented by the collaboration with Reinhard Selten (Nobel Prize 1994), again on the themes of bounded rationality, and by studies on Behavioural economics carried out in the last decade.

== Study of biases in problem-solving ==
Egidi's experiments in problem solving suggest that biases in problem solving may result from the process of mental editing by which subjects produce an imperfect and incomplete representation of the decision problem. From these experiments, stable sub-optimal routinized behaviors emerged, and offered clear evidence that individuals, having discovered the solution of a problem in a limited domain, try to make use of the same solution beyond the original domain. This phenomenon has been previously discovered in a particular setting by Abraham S. Luchins and defined "mechanization of thought", where individuals remain locked into the procedure they have learnt, without reacting to new instances of the problem even when a new and better solution is evidently available. Individuals therefore extrapolate the solution of a problem beyond the domain of optimality, because they have categorized the situation incompletely or imperfectly. They make in fact systematic use of default classifications in order to reduce the short-term memory load and the complexity of symbolic manipulation. The result is the construction of an imperfect mental representation of the problem that nevertheless has the advantage of being simple. Herbert A. Simon's bounded rationality can therefore be interpreted as full rationality within an imperfect representation.

== Selected bibliography ==
Egidi is the author of many articles, papers, and chapters. This is a selection of some of the most significant of his works from 1990 to date.

Journal articles

- Ajmone Marsan G, Bellomon, Egidi M.(2008). Towards a mathematical theory of complex socio-economical system by functional subsystems representation, Kinetic and Related Models; p. 249-278, ISSN 1937-5093.
- Egidi M.(2006). From Bounded Rationality to Behavioral Economics. Storia del Pensiero Economico, vol. 1; p. 51–67, ISSN 1828-1990.
- Egidi M.(2004). Distorsioni nelle decisioni razionali. Rivista Italiana Degli Economisti, vol. 1; p. 33–75, ISSN 1593-8662.
- Egidi M.(2003). Razionalità Limitata. Sistemi Intelligenti, vol. XV; p. 67–72, ISSN 1120-9550.

Chapters

- Egidi M.(2012) "The cognitive explanation of economic behaviour:from Simon to Kahnerman" in Arena R., Festrè A., Lazaric, N. Handbook of Knowledge and Economics. Aldershot: Edward Elgar.
- Egidi M.(2008). Le processus dual du raisonnement: origines, problèmes et perspectives. In: Walliser B., Economie et cognition.p. 11-54, Paris: Ophys/Maison des Sciences de l'Homme, ISBN 978-2-7080-1159-5.
- Egidi M.(2003). Discrepancies:competing theories and ideologies as cognitive traps. In: Rizzello S. Editor, Cognitive Developments in Economics. London: Routledge.
- Egidi M.(1996) “Routines, Hierarchies of Problems, Procedural Behaviour: Some Evidence from Experiments”. In: The rational foundations of economic behaviour, Arrow, Kenneth J., et al., editors, St. New York: Martin’s Press, London: Macmillan Press, in association with the International Economic Association. (114), 303–333.
