= Public Procurement Service =

Government agency of South Korea

- 조달청

Agency overview
- Formed: October 2, 1961; 64 years ago
- Superseding agency: Ministry of Economy and Finance
- Headquarters: 189, Cheongsa-ro, Government Complex Building 3, Seo-gu, Daejeon
- Employees: 565

Korean name
- Hangul: 조달청
- Hanja: 調達廳
- RR: Jodalcheong
- MR: Chodalch'ŏng

The Public Procurement Service (PPS; Korean: 조달청) is a governmental organization in South Korea and is run under the Ministry of Economy and Finance. It is tasked with the purchasing, supply and management of materials required for major building works in the country. The headquarters are in Seo District, Daejeon.

PPS is member of the Procurement G6, an informal group leading the use of framework agreements and e-procurement instruments in Public procurement.

== History ==
On December 10, 1948, the South Korean government signed a ECA aid pact to fund South Korea. This created a new need for ministries handling matters related to the ECA aid, and thus, the temporary foreign capital bureau was founded in 1949. This government agency was administered directly under the prime minister, and another separate government agency handling similar affairs also coexisted under the president, but the two were later merged in 1955. As domestic industries began to develop after the Korean War, the government decided to change the direction of the said government agency. In 1961, the government agency with the modern name was officially founded.
