= Bid and proposal =

In procurement of goods or services, the bid and proposal (B&P) are a firm's plan (proposal) and proposed cost (bid) for fulfilling the conditions outlined in a request for proposal or other information gathering or supplier contact activity. The development of a bid and proposal takes place early in the procurement process, and the resulting proposal will be subject to review by the purchaser and negotiation between the two parties. Developing a bid and proposal takes place before a contract vehicle is in place, meaning that firms undertake the costly tasks of proposal-writing and cost estimation before they are awarded a contract. Often in official use of these two terms, a "bid" supposes the limits or scope of work is similar, and usually the lowest bid is awarded work, especially in government contracts. Proposals mean the entity is fully aware of the details and that the scope of work may vary, and the work is awarded to the best "plan" rather than simply the lowest price. Quality and quantity are more of a consideration when proposals are taken seriously as opposed to the lowest "bid."
