= Luiss University =

Private university in Rome

Coordinates: 41°55′28″N 12°29′35″E

LUISS Guido Carli
- Libera Università Internazionale degli Studi Sociali Guido Carli (Italian)
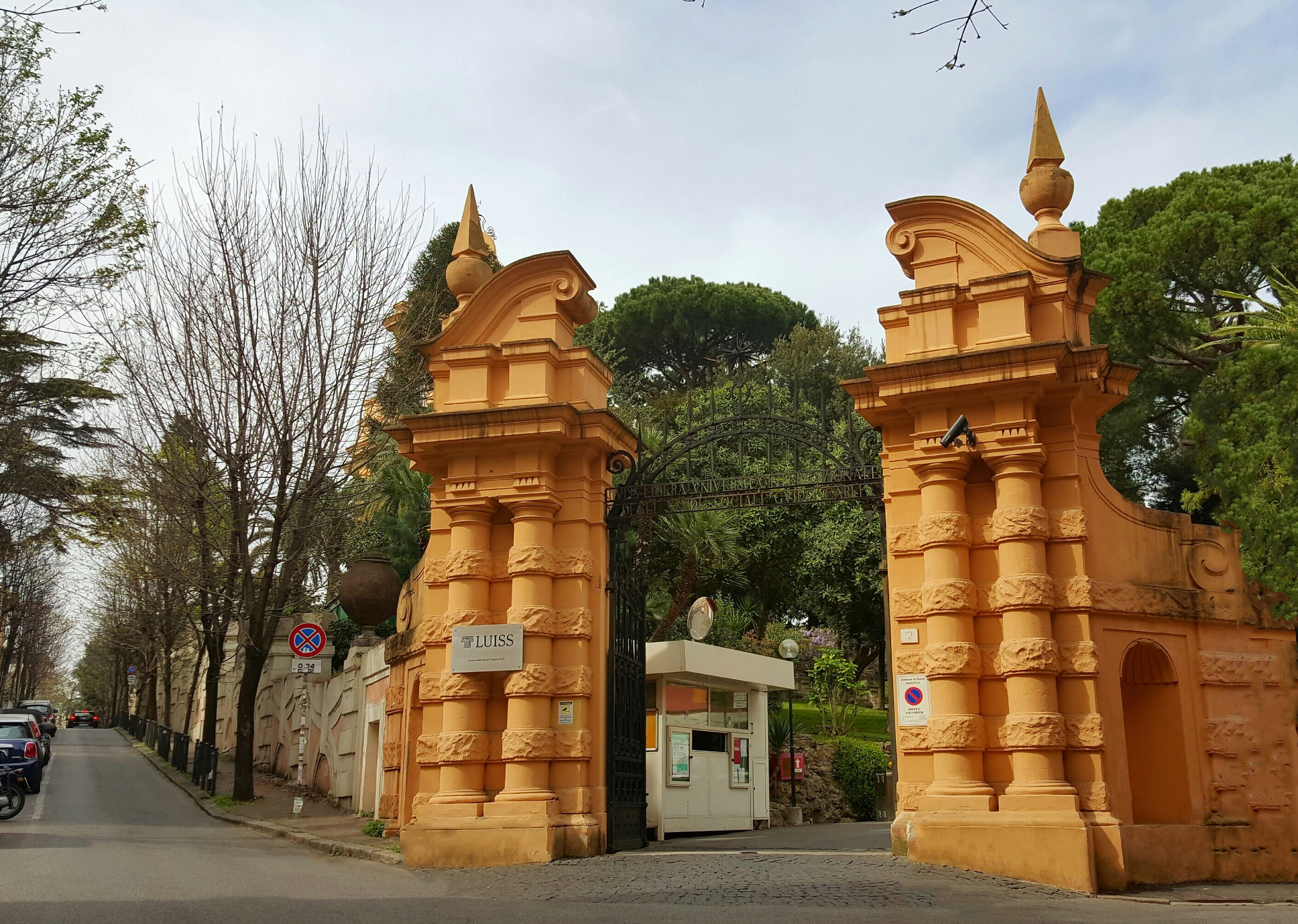
- Entrance to the main campus of Luiss University, located in Rome on Viale Pola.
- Type: Private university
- Established: 1974; 52 years ago
- Founder: Umberto Agnelli
- Affiliations: QTEM Masters Network
- President: Giorgio Fossa
- Rector: Paolo Boccardelli
- Director: Rita Carisano
- Administrative staff: 1,761 (2018)
- Students: 11,000
- Location: Viale Pola, 12, Rome, 00198, Italy
- Sporting affiliations: Luiss Sport
- Website: www.luiss.edu www.luiss.it/en www.luiss.ac

Luiss University (Italian: Libera Università Internazionale degli Studi Sociali Guido Carli, lit. 'Guido Carli Free International University of Social Studies') is a private university located in Rome, Italy, founded in 1974 by Umberto Agnelli.

It provides undergraduate and postgraduate education, in addition to a range of Dual Degree programs, in the fields of finance, business, management, economics, law, and political science. It is located near the historical center of the city, between the Parioli and Trieste quarters. The university is supported by Confindustria, the Italian Confederation of Industries. Luiss has four different campuses: one in Viale Pola, one in Via Parenzo, one in Villa Blanc, and the last one in Viale Romania. It also has a library in Via di Santa Costanza.

In the UI GreenMetric World University Rankings 2025, Luiss Guido Carli ranked 12th worldwide out of 1,745 universities from 105 countries, and 2nd in Italy.

== History ==
In 1974, Umberto Agnelli (the brother of Gianni Agnelli, who at the time was president of Confindustria), launched a project investing economic and intellectual resources in the establishment of a university. This university would be designed to offer undergraduate and postgraduate education that is geared toward the needs of the market.

Luiss came out of a pre-existing university (Pro Deo University, founded in 1966), which was redesigned and renamed Luiss (an acronym for Libera Università Internazionale degli Studi Sociali, which means "Free International University of Social Studies") in 1977. Eventually, other public and private industrial groups, as well as some banks, joined the founders.

The group of businessmen and bankers who had promoted and financed the birth of the project, as well as the transformation of the organization of the old Pro Deo University, into the more modern ones of Luiss University, as it is today, was established in 1985 in the current "Friends of Luiss". From its inception Senator Umberto Agnelli acted as its president. He was succeeded by Francesco Gaetano Caltagirone (still in office), who is central to the funding of scholarships for competent but disadvantaged students at doctoral levels.

Guido Carli, former Governor of the Banca d'Italia, President of Confindustria, and later Senator, was President of Luiss from 1978 until he died in 1993. His work was so highly esteemed that in 1994 the university changed its name to Luiss Guido Carli.

Originally, the university had only the faculties of Economics and Political Science, to which were added the faculty of Law in 1982. In 2011, an academic reorganization took place, which resulted in today's six Departments: Law, Business and Management, Economics and Financial Markets, Political Science, Accounting and Corporate Finance and AI, Data and Decision Sciences. Today the university offers many courses entirely taught in English, such as 'Economics and Business', 'Management and Artificial Intelligence' or 'Politics: Philosophy and Economics'.

== Admission ==
To attend a degree at one of the six departments at Luiss, candidates must pass an admission test. Each year a maximum number of places available is set and the admission test is done in two different sessions (one in February and one in May), after which a ranking by session is drafted, where each student has a score made up of their final grade in high school and their test score. Admission is based on the available slots and where selected students choose not to attend, other students are selected from the waiting list.

The admission test lasts 90 minutes and is made up of 100 multiple-choice questions measuring general culture (15%) and aptitude (85%). The subjects on the test are logic and reading comprehension; logical and mathematical aptitude and financial mathematics; numerical and spatial logic; abstract reasoning and critical/verbal skills; knowledge of general math and general culture (current events, history, literature, philosophy); and English.

Luiss University reports a high level of academic selectivity; 68.1% of its admitted students possess a secondary school final grade exceeding 90/100, while the Italian national average for the same cohort is 24.6%.

To be admitted to a master's degree, Luiss' graduates with degree grades of 100 or above can be admitted to degrees without having to take an admission test, until all the available slots are taken. Graduates from other universities (for a maximum of 250) must take a written test to apply for admission.

== Organization ==
The university is divided into six departments:

=== Department of Law ===
The Department of Law provides a single five-year cycle for the combined bachelor's and master's degree program in Law (category: LGM-01) (in Italian); Global Law (category: L-14) (in English).

=== Department of Business and Management ===
The Department of Business and Management offers the following degree programs:

- Bachelor's degree in Economics and Management (category L-18) (in Italian); Business Administration (category L-18) (in English); Management and Artificial Intelligence (category L-18) (in English);
- Master's degree in Strategic Management (category LM-77) (in English and Italian); Management (category LM-77) (in English); Administration, Finance and Control (category LM-77) (in English and Italian); Marketing (category LM-77) (in English and Italian); Data Science and Management (category LM-91) (in English); Global Management and Politics (category LM-77) (in English)

=== Department of Economics and Financial Markets ===
The Department of Economics and Finance offers the following degree programs:

- Bachelor's degree in Economics and Business (category L-33) (in English);
- Master's degree in Economics, Institutions and Financial Markets (category LM-56) (in English and Italian); Finance (category LM-77) (in English)

=== Department of Political Science ===
The Department of Political Science offers the following degree programs:

- Bachelor's degree in Political Science (category L-36) (in Italian); Politics: Philosophy and Economics (category L-36) (in English);
- Master's degree in International Relations (category LM-52) (in English); Government and Public Affairs (category LM-62) (in English and Italian)

=== Postgraduate schools ===
The university has five autonomous postgraduate schools:

- LUISS Business School is a school for professional management and a center of research and management consulting. It has its MBA program, various types of master's degrees, and ad hoc training courses for business customers;
- LUISS School of Government offers specific training, through the provision of four different master's degrees in the field of political processes and decision-making, both in the public and private sectors;
- LUISS School of European Political Economy is a research and specialization school as well as a center of research dedicated to issues of European scope.
- LUISS School of Law is a school for the theoretical study of specific legal problems along with practice activities such as mock trials;
- LUISS "Massimo Baldini" School of Journalism offers two-year Master's degrees programs and Executive Courses.

=== PhD School ===
The Luiss PhD School has four Doctoral programs:

- Doctoral Program in Politics
- PhD Program in Economics
- PhD Program in Management
- PhD Program in Law and Business (in Italian)

== Corporate placement and campus drive ==
Luiss provides corporate placement opportunities for its students and collaborated internationally for exploring students' dynamics for international experience. The first collaboration took place in December 2021 with TreeAndHumanKnot RisingIndia Think-tank.

== Campuses ==
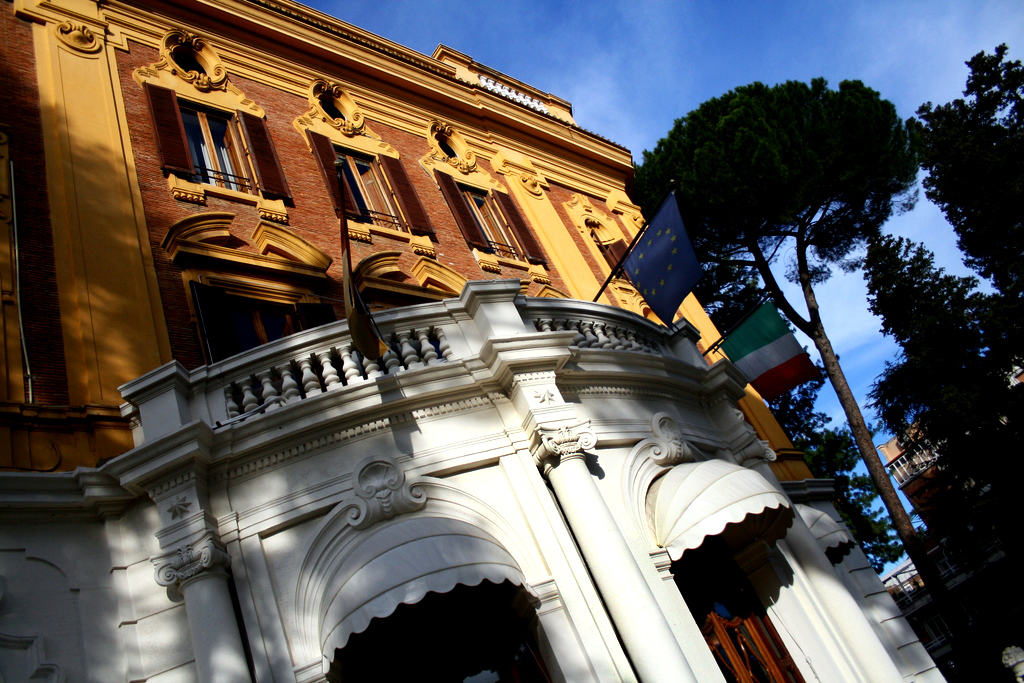
Front of the Palazzina at Viale Pola – Rector's office

Luiss Guido Carli currently has five campuses in Rome.

The main campus is situated in Viale Pola 12 (in the 1930s, this was the residence of Count Galeazzo Ciano and Edda Mussolini), in the Trieste quarter. It's the university's rectorate, general management, administrative services, human resources, and academic support services. Master's degrees, the Massimo Baldini School of Journalism and the Luiss School of Government, as well as the Luiss Business School and LUISS University Press, are also located here.

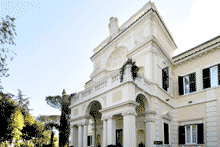
Villa Hertz – Viale Romania campus

The Viale Romania campus opened in October 2007 in Viale Romania 32, in the heart of the Parioli quarter. This campus has the largest number of buildings and students even though it has not been completed yet: only the first 9,420 m^{2} (11,270 sq yd) out of the 28,000 m^{2} (33,000 sq yd) planned are currently being used. This campus (converted from a former school entirely redesigned as a university campus) houses the Departments of Business and Management, Economics and Financial Markets, and Political Science, the Student Office, the Orientation Office, the Placement Office, Teaching and Research, International Relations and IT.

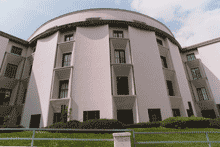
Via Parenzo campus

The Department of Law is located in Via Parenzo 11, which is near the main campus of Viale Pola. The building was originally a hospital for blind war veterans (commemorated by a marble plaque inside the building). In the 1990s, Confindustria decided to take over the structure, restoring the original plan and shape of the building while completely renovating the interior. The building was designed by Pietro Aschieri in 1929–1931 and renovated by Studio Passarelli 1990–93. Substantial parts of the interior were renovated to their original design.

The newest Luiss campus is Villa Blanc, home to the LUISS Business School, in Via Nomentana 216. The campus was inaugurated in June 2018.

There is also the campus located in Via di Santa Costanza, which houses a library that specializes in the economic, legal, political, and social sciences. The Library has over 100,000 books, 1,800 journals, and 80 databases.

== Administration ==
=== Presidents ===
- Félix Morlion, from the university's founding to October 31, 1975 ("Pro Deo" and "Luiss")
- Carlo Ferrero, from November 1, 1975, to October 31, 1978
- Guido Carli, from November 1, 1978, to April 23, 1993
- Luigi Abete, from November 1, 1993, to July 18, 2001
- Antonio D'Amato, from July 18, 2001, to December 20, 2004
- Luca Cordero di Montezemolo, from December 20, 2004, to July 15, 2010
- Emma Marcegaglia, from July 16, 2010, to June 18, 2019
- Vincenzo Boccia, from June 19, 2019
- Luigi Gubitosi, from October 19, to April 9, 2025
- Giorgio Fossa, from April 9, 2025

=== Rectors ===
- Roberto Lucifredi, from November 1, 1966, to July 27, 1974 ("Pro Deo")
- Giuseppe Mira, from November 1, 1974, to October 31, 1977 ("Pro Deo" and "Luiss")
- Rosario Romeo, from November 1, 1978, to July 16, 1984 ("Luiss")
- Carlo Scognamiglio, from November 1, 1984, to June 18, 1992
- Mario Arcelli, from July 16, 1992, to September 30, 2002
- Adriano De Maio, from October 1, 2002, to June 16, 2005
- Marcello Foschini, from June 16, 2005, to September 30, 2006
- Massimo Egidi, from October 1, 2006, to October 3, 2016
- Paola Severino, from October 3, 2016, to June 18, 2018
- Andrea Prencipe, from June 18, 2018
- Paolo Boccardelli, from June 26, 2024

=== General Managers ===
- Pier Luigi Celli, from May 1, 2005, to July 14, 2013
- Giovanni Lo Storto, from July 15, 2013
- Rita Carisano, from November 21, 2024

== Other figures ==
=== Deans of Departments ===
- Irene Finocchi (Head of the Department AI, Data and Decision Sciences)
- Antonio Punzi (Dean of the Department of Law)
- Alberto Petrucci (Dean of the Department of Economics and Finance)
- Christian Lechner (Dean of the Department of Business and Management)
- Giovanni Orsina (Dean of the Department of Political Science)

=== Faculty (former and current) ===
- Glauco Benigni (Author, journalist, former Head of International Press of Rai Italia)
- Francesco Giorgino (Rai TV Presenter)
- Giuliano Amato (jurist, politician, former Prime Minister of Italy)
- Dario Antiseri (philosopher)
- Daniele Archibugi (economist)
- Fabiano Schivardi (economist)
- Fabrizio Cacciafesta (mathematician)
- Matteo Arpe (banker, former CEO of Capitalia)
- Antonio Baldassarre (former President of the Constitutional Court of Italy, President of Sisal and Rai)
- Giuseppe Conte (former Prime Minister of Italy)
- Vincenzo Caianiello (former President of the Constitutional Court of Italy, jurist, magistrate and politician)
- Lucio Caracciolo (geopolitical analyst)
- Antonio Catricalà (jurist)
- Pier Luigi Celli (writer, entrepreneur, manager)
- Fulvio Conti (CEO and general manager of Enel)
- Roberto D'Alimonte (political analyst)
- Vincenzo Fagiolo (cardinal)
- Fabio Fortuna (economist)
- Augusto Fantozzi (former Minister of Finance)
- Domenico Fisichella (political analyst, then Senator, Minister of Culture, Vice President of the Senate)
- Giovanni Maria Flick (former President of the Constitutional Court of Italy)
- Franco Fontana (President of Cassa di Risparmio della Provincia dell'Aquila and chairman of the board of Statutory Auditors at Enel)
- Enrico Giovannini (economist, statistician and former Minister of Labour and Social Policies)
- David Held (political analyst, philosopher)
- Antonio Martino (economist, politician, Minister of Foreign Affairs and Minister of Defence)
- Daniele Mastrogiacomo (journalist)
- Giuseppe Mazzei (journalist)
- Carlo Mezzanotte (Vice President Emeritus of the Constitutional Court of Italy)
- Andrea Monorchio (economist and accountant general of the State)
- Fiamma Nirenstein (journalist and politician)
- Giovanni Orsina (historian, scientific editor of the Luigi Einaudi Foundation, Rome)
- Alessandro Pajno (magistrate, President of the Council of State)
- Luciano Pellicani (sociologist and journalist)
- Pietro Perlingieri (jurist and university professor)
- Mario Pescante (entrepreneur and politician)
- Roberto Pessi (labor law expert and lawyer)
- Francesco Pizzetti (jurist, President of the Authority to Guarantee Privacy)
- Gaetano Quagliariello (politician, former Minister for Institutional Reforms)
- Giuseppe Pizza (politician and Undersecretary of Public Education, Universities and Scientific Research)
- Pietro Reichlin (economist, brother of Lucrezia Reichlin)
- Gian Luigi Rondi (critic)
- Giuseppe Sacco (economist, columnist)
- Paolo Savona (economist, former Minister of Industry, President of UniCredit)
- Carlo Scognamiglio (former President of the Senate, Minister of Defence, Honorary President of the Italian Aspen Institute and of the Rizzoli-Corriere della Sera publishing group)
- Vincenzo Scotti (politician, Minister of the Interior and Undersecretary of Foreign Affairs)
- Paola Severino (jurist, former Minister of Justice)
- Chicco Testa (entrepreneur)
- Sergio Vento (diplomat)
- Vincenzo Visco (former Minister of Finance and Vice Minister of Economy and Finance)
- Victor Zaslavsky (historian)

=== Alumni ===
- Elisabetta Belloni (Secretary General of the Ministry of Foreign Affairs)
- Rosy Bindi (politician)
- Concetta Brescia Morra (professor of Law, member of Administrative Board of Review of European Banking Supervision)
- Daniele Capezzone (politician)
- Annagrazia Calabria (politician)
- Fabio Caressa (journalist)
- Lorenzo Cesa (politician)
- Giovanni Chiodi (politician)
- Ranieri de Marchis (Head of Internal Audit at UniCredit)
- Giovanni Floris (journalist)
- Gerardo Greco (journalist)
- Giulia Innocenzi (journalist)
- Maurizio Lauri (Chairman of the Board of Statutory Auditors at UniCredit)
- Giampiero Massolo (Ambassador, President of Fincantieri, former General Secretary of the Ministry of Foreign Affairs)
- Antonio Mele (economist)
- Carlo Messina (CEO of Intesa Sanpaolo)
- Massimo Moratti (CEO of Saras S.p.A.)
- Marco Nori (CEO of Isolfin)
- Marco Furore (politician, Member of the European Parliament)
- Nicola Ottaviani (politician, mayor of Frosinone)
- Pieter Omtzigt (Dutch politician)
- Elio Leoni Sceti (businessman)
- Alessandro Cardelli (Capitan Regent of the Republic of San Marino)
- Alessandro Battilocchio (politician)
- Fabio Panetta (Deputy Governor of Bank of Italy, member of the SSM Supervisory Board)
- Roberto Speranza (politician, former Minister of Health)
- Riccardo Zacconi (CEO of King)
- Luca Maestri (former CFO of Apple Inc.)
- Princess Victoria Romanovna (businesswoman)

== Rankings ==
- QS World University Rankings 2024: Ranked #25 in the world for Politics and International Studies, and among the top 100 for Business & Management, Law, and Marketing.
- Financial Times Rankings 2024:
  - Ranked #27 globally for the Master's in Finance (pre-experience).
  - Ranked #25 globally for the Master's in Management.
- CENSIS: Ranked #1 in Italy among large non-state universities.
- UI GreenMetric World University Rankings: Ranked #15 worldwide among the most sustainable universities.
- EFMD EQUIS: An accreditation awarded to the top 1% of Business Schools and Departments worldwide.
- AMBA (Association of MBAs): Accreditation granted in 2020. Only 2% of Business Schools worldwide receive this recognition for their MBA programs.
- AACSB Accreditation: Granted in 2023. Luiss is one of the few institutions worldwide to hold the "Triple Crown" status—EQUIS, AMBA, and AACSB—an honor held by less than 1% of business schools globally.

== See also ==
- List of Italian universities
- List of business schools in Europe
- Rome
- Luiss Business School
- Luiss School of Government
