= Request for association =

Commercial document

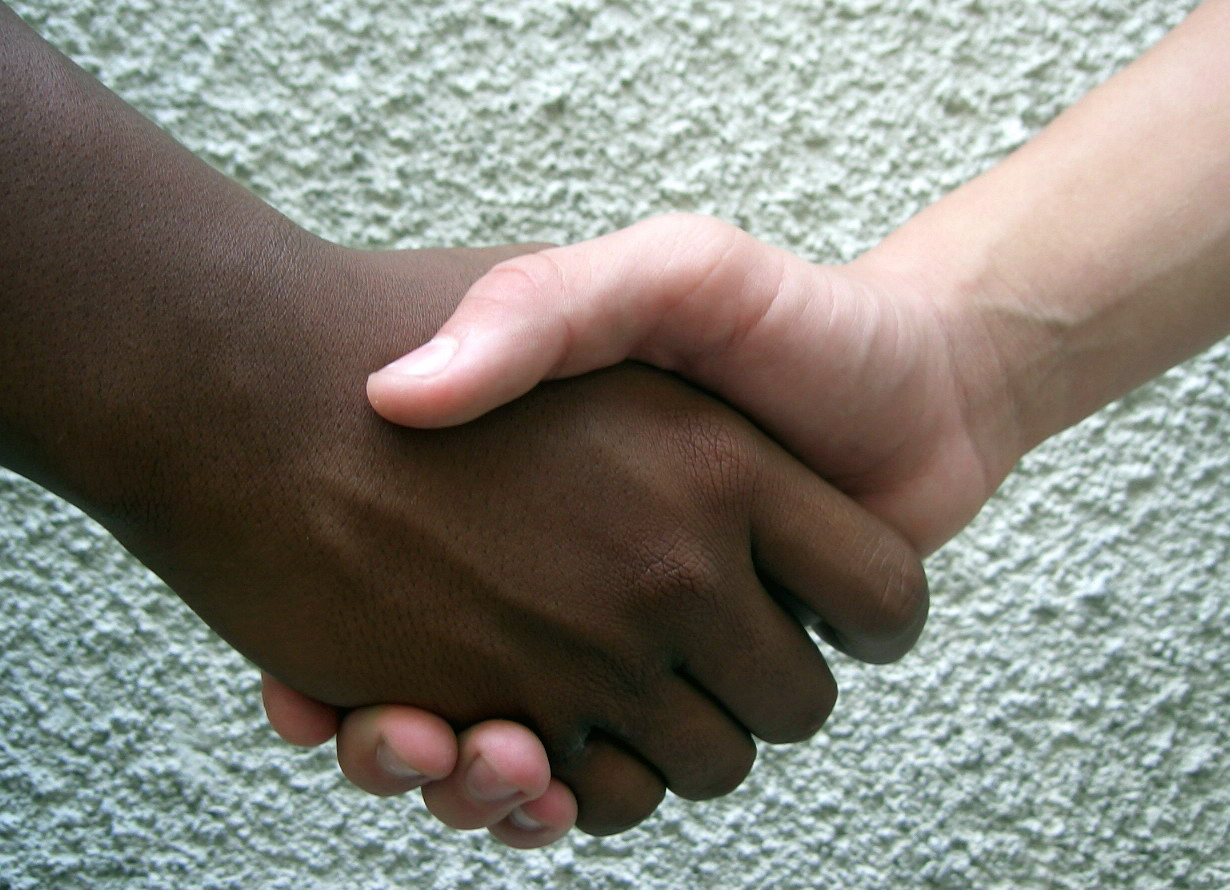

A request for association (RFA) or request for collaboration, also called, though less frequently (see below) request for partnership, request for partner or request for alliance, is a commercial document issued by a party which invites association with another party. Kate Vitasek et al. refer to a "request for partner" or "request for collaboration" as part of a continuum of RfX approaches in a paper called "Unpacking Collaborative Bidding" published in 2016. "RfX" is a collective term for business invitation processes such as a request for information (RFI), request for proposal (RFP), or request for quotation (RFQ).

The request for association may be specific, with the addressee stated within, or unspecific, open to anyone interested in association.

== Characteristics ==
The proposed association usually has a commercial business purpose (for example, for a joint venture or for use in the voluntary sector).

Instead of describing in detail the specifications of a product (as a request for quotation does), a RFA focuses on the mutual benefits that both parties would obtain from their alliance: "...engages the potential sponsor in thinking about how your project could help his or her own larger goals".

One of the parties may provide ideas, experience or raw materials, whilst the other one may provide money, machines or workers.

== See also ==
- Request for quotation
- Request for information
- Request for proposal
- Request for solution
