= Request for solution =

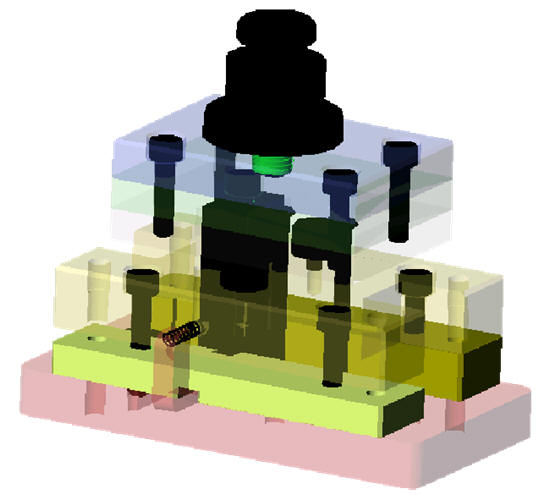
A complex arrangement of parts. A request for solution could ask a simpler arrangement performing the same functions.

A request for solution (RFS, also known as request for proposed solution) is a commercial document that describes a technological or organizational situation and demands a solution (for example, a new arrangement of information technology, IT) to possible suppliers of this solution. This document is normally issued by the organization which would benefit from the solution. The buying organisation keeps a dialogue with would-be suppliers to determine together the best solution.

The difference with a request for proposal (RFP) consists of the RFS being much more open and leaving more space to innovate. Both RFP and RFS have requirements, but those of RFS are more general. RFSs also need less time to be answered, so they are likely to get a higher number of responses.

"A classic example of request for solution: the client gave general instructions regarding the solution while laying lesser restrictions on specific technology."

"In contrast to a detailed, buyer-led RFP, the RFS is an open-ended, collaborative process. The customer describes its environment, objectives, concerns, and risk tolerance and the potential suppliers come back with solutions that meet those general requirements."

The RFS may be used as the first step in a procurement process. Once a determined solution has been selected, the process can advance one step, issuing, for example, a RFP, more specific and detailed.

== Controversy ==
Lutz Peichert challenges the need for yet another procurement term (RFS) when RFP already exists. John Healer, on the contrary, has found "the Request for Solution language to be of value". Researchers from the University of Tennessee consider RFS "an emerging competitive bidding methodology".

== See also ==
- Call for bids
- Request for quotation
- Request for information
- Request for association
