= Proposal software =

Proposal software also known as proposal management software, proposal writing software, or proposal automation software is a computer program designed to help users develop proposals, presentations, and responses to RFPs. Proposal management software is becoming increasingly popular in companies that manage frequent and extensive proposal writing projects. Such software allows businesses to automate more routine tasks while easily tracking multiple versions.

Proposal software allows users to create and manage all important sales and marketing documentation such as business proposals, welcome letters, contracts, quotes, and marketing collateral. Often available as a web-based cloud service, proposal software helps sales, marketing, and legal teams both administer the proposal creation process and communicate their needs through a digital document. Many software applications integrate with CRM software, content management solutions, accounting platforms, and electronic signature providers. Some integrate with Microsoft Office.

Proposal management software is considered to be a sales efficiency tool as it helps cross-selling and upselling by spending less time on creating and managing sales documents and delivering timely and relevant information. In some cases, it's argued that this software solution bleeds into an up-and-coming "sales enablement" software genre. However, proposal management software addresses inefficiencies and lack of visibility in the sales cycle, rather than "sales enablement" efforts defined as sales coaching and guiding the sale. Forrester Research, a business technology analyst firm, views sales enablement and efficiency tools, such as proposal management software, as the key linchpin required to help a B2B company bridge the gap between their business strategies and how they execute in the field.

== Main features ==
The core features of proposal management software vary widely between systems. Many simpler programs have only basic features, while others, especially enterprise systems, are more complex and powerful. Proposal management software is a set of automated processes that may support the following features.

- Allow for a large number of people to share and contribute to both stored proposal templates and data;
- Control access to proposals based on defined user roles (i.e., define information that users or user groups can view, edit, publish, etc.);
- Provides multi-tier approval;
- Facilitates storage and retrieval of proposals;
- Control over data validity;
- Simplify proposal writing;
- Improve communication and collaboration among users;
- Management of specific sections of a document;
- Increased content and brand compliance;
- Decrease in time to final assembly;
- Track the time spent by various contributors, enabling management to calculate ROI of each document.

== Data types and usage ==
Proposal software is frequently used for storing, controlling, revising, semantically enriching, and publishing documentation. Serving as a central repository, the proposal software increases the version level of new updates to an already existing file.

Salespeople commonly use a standard proposal that is modified to meet the specific requirements of a customer or prospect. Copying and pasting boilerplate material is one way to prepare proposals..

The software enables users to assemble individual components into a document structure. Some solutions offer users a 'shopping cart' experience, where salespeople are able to select which content components to include in the final document. These components are then reused (rather than copied and pasted) within a document or across multiple documents. Data tags and smart content sections allow for automatic tailoring by client name, region, or product selection. This ensures that content is consistent across the entire document set.

== Web-based ==
Software as a service (SaaS) or web-based proposal management software require content to be imported into the system. However, once content is imported, the software acts like a search engine so users can find what they are looking for faster. The HTML format allows for better application of search capabilities such as full-text searching and stemming.

=== Enterprise system ===
Enterprise software tend to offer more customized solutions intended to improve the enterprise's productivity and sales efficiency by providing advanced functionality, robust business logic, and support functionality.
