= Proposal (business) =

Written offer from a seller to a prospective buyer

A business proposal is a written offer from a seller to a prospective buyer.

Business proposals are often a key step in a complex sales process, where a buyer considers more than price in a purchase.

A proposal puts the buyer's requirements in a context that favors the seller's products and services, and educates the buyer about the seller's capability to satisfy their needs.

There are three distinct categories of business proposals: formally solicited, informally solicited, unsolicited.

== Solicited proposals ==
Solicited proposals are written in response to published requirements, contained in a request for proposal (RFP), request for quotation (RFQ), invitation for bid (IFB), or a request for information (RFI).

Request for proposal (RFP)

RFPs provide detailed specifications of what the customer wants to buy and sometimes include directions for preparing the proposal, as well as evaluation criteria the customer will use to evaluate offers. Customers issue RFPs when their needs cannot be met with generally available products or services. RFIs are issued to qualify the vendors who are interested in providing service/products for specific requirements. Based on the response to RFI, detailed RFP is issued to qualified vendors who the organization believes can provide desired services. Proposals in response to RFPs are seldom less than 10 pages and sometimes reach thousands of pages, without cost data.

Request for quotation (RFQ)

Customers issue RFQs when they want to buy large amounts of a commodity and price is not the only issue—for example, when availability or delivering or service are considerations. RFQs can be very detailed, so proposals written to RFQs can be lengthy but are generally much shorter than an RFP-proposal. RFQ proposals consist primarily of cost data, with brief narratives addressing customer issues, such as quality control.

Invitation for bid (IFB)

Customers issue IFBs when they are buying some service, such as construction. The requirements are detailed, but the primary consideration is price. For example, a customer provides architectural blueprints for contractors to bid on. These proposals can be lengthy but most of the length comes from cost-estimating data and detailed schedules.

Request for information (RFI)

Sometimes before a customer issues an RFP or RFQ or IFB, the customer will issue a Request for Information (RFI). The purpose of the RFI is to gain "marketing intelligence" about what products, services, and vendors are available. RFIs are used to shape final RFPs, RFQs, and IFBs, so potential vendors take great care in responding to these requests, hoping to shape the eventual formal solicitation toward their products or services.

== Informally solicited proposal ==
These types of proposals are made when a private firm, government agency, or association negotiates to supply a service or product to a single company and when a company has excellent credibility and a track record of achievements. The standard format for this type of proposal consists of information about a specific product, including the price and delivery schedules. Some advantages to this include not having to have resources to win a contract and the firm or client knows what time the work will be coming.

Internal proposals

Internal proposals are ideas or projects that are presented to whoever holds the position of top management in a company. These types of proposals can be written by a particular individual, group, department, or division of a particular company. One example of this is when the manager of a product line writes a proposal suggesting that the company should robotize the production process. Some advantages to this include easier communication, knowing the client's needs and making fast decisions. Some disadvantages to this may include competition from other companies and the loss of management champions.

== Unsolicited proposal ==
Unsolicited proposals are generic marketing brochures used to introduce a product or service to a prospective customer. They are often used as "leave-behinds" at the end of initial meetings with or customers or "give-aways" at trade shows or other public meetings. They are not designed to close a sale, just introduce the possibility of a sale.

== Components ==
=== Formally solicited proposals ===
1. Requirements Matrix, which matches customer requirements with the paragraph and page numbers of where those requirements are addressed in the proposal
2. Executive Summary, which outlines the primary benefits of the vendor's solutions to the customer's requirements
3. Technical Volume, which demonstrates how each requirement will be met
4. Management Volume, which describes how the program will be managed
5. Cost Volume, which provides all costing data, as well as implementation plans and schedules

=== Informally solicited business proposal ===
1. A description of the seller's capabilities or products
2. A discussion of key issues
3. A description of the buyer's specifications and how they will be met
4. The cost of the offering
5. A schedule for delivery of the products or services
6. Proof of prior experience i.e. Testimonials from previous customers, Descriptions of previous projects

== Managing business proposals ==
Proposal management often consists of the following basic roles and responsibilities:

- Creator – responsible for creating and editing content.
- Editor – responsible for tuning the content message and the style of delivery, including translation and localization.
- Publisher – responsible for releasing the content for use.
- Administrator – responsible for managing access permissions to documents and files, usually accomplished by assigning access rights to user groups or roles.
- Consumer or viewer – the person who reads or otherwise takes in content after it is published or shared.

Some writers refer to key stages in the proposal management process using colour codes to denote milestone reviews, for example a black hat review. The Association of Proposal Management Professionals (APMP) refers to a black hat review as an independent review of the strategies and proposals likely to be put forward by competitors. Other colours are used in relation to teams: a pre-writing strategy review is sometimes called a "Pink Team", a formal draft review may be called a "Red Team", and the term "Gold Team" indicates a final pre-submission review.

Inherent to the process of managing proposal is the decision of whether to submit a bid, which is underpinned by the capture plan.

== See also ==
- Bidding
- Call for bids
- Construction bidding
- E-procurement
- Procurement
- Proposal theme statement
- Presales
- Offer and acceptance
