= Local eGovernment =

Local eGovernment is eGovernment as it relates to local government, police, fire, national park and transport authorities.

== Local eGovernment in England ==
The UK government’s objective was that all of the public services in England should be capable of being delivered electronically by 31 December 2005. The Modernising Government White Paper of March 1999 proposed "all dealings with government being deliverable electronically by 2008." Prime Minister Tony Blair then announced on 30 March 2000 that the target date had been brought forward from 2008 to 2005.

Electronic delivery is defined as delivery through internet protocols and other ICT methods, and includes delivery by telephone if the officer receiving the call can access electronic information and/or update records online there and then.

The average local authority achieved a reported 97% e-enablement by 31 December 2005, though it is suspected the actual figure is much lower. The target also applied to the Civil Service, which achieved a reported 96%.

=== Objectives and performance management ===
==== Implementing Electronic Government (IEG) Statements ====
From December 2001 to April 2006 local authorities were required to publish an IEG Statement on their degree of e-enablement (electronic enablement). The measures include BVPI 157 and the Priority Outcomes.

==== Best Value Performance Indicator (BVPI) 157 ====
BVPI 157 measures the percentage of 'interactions' provided by a local authority that are e-enabled. The figure must be published annually as part of the Best Value performance management framework. The figure is calculated by considering the following ten types of interaction as they apply to the services provided by the local authority:

- providing information
- collecting revenue
- providing benefits and grants
- consultation
- regulation (such as issuing licences)
- applications for services
- booking venues, resources and courses
- paying for goods and services
- providing access to community, professional or business networks
- procurement

Local authorities may use a proprietary list of services, but are required to validate their list against the Local Government Services List (LGSL). BVPI 157 forms part of the annual IEG statement.

==== Priority Outcomes ====
To guide local authorities in implementing eGovernment, the Department for Transport, Local Government and the Regions (and its successor the Office of the Deputy Prime Minister (ODPM)) issued a list of key targets, most commonly referred to as the Priority Outcomes or PSOs (Priority Service Outcomes). The list was issued in the snappily entitled document Defining E-government Outcomes for 2005 to Support the Delivery of Priority Services & National Strategy Transformation Agenda for Local Authorities in England – Version 1.0. In September 2004, detailed guidance on the Priority Outcomes was issued in the document Priority Outcomes - Explanatory Notes for Practitioners, published by the IDeA (Improvement and Development Agency) and endorsed by the ODPM.

Priority Outcomes are rated with three levels of obligation:

- Required = To be implemented (available for use) by Dec 2005
- Good = To be approved for funding and being actively implemented by Dec 2005 and implemented by April 1, 2006
- Excellent = Voluntary for authorities that have implemented required and good outcomes early.

The following technologies are recommended in Priority Outcomes: Explanatory Notes for Practitioners as those likely to be essential in the achievement of the Priority Outcomes:

- Customer relationship management system:
  - Customer database (single view of info on each customer, citizen and business)
  - Customer tracking (across access channels and from contact to resolution)
  - Data warehousing (central repository for data, including legacy data)
- Middleware and web services (manages flow of data between all systems, including external)
- Document management system:
  - Workflow, messaging and e-forms (gets work to the right people at the right time)
  - Document and records management (e-storage of all documents and info)
- Content management (system for publishing content to all access channels)
- Security, authentication and smartcards (for security of information)
- e-Payments (system for receiving payments to the council)
- e-Procurement (system for internal/external buying processes)
- Geographic Information System (GIS) (access to geographical data through maps)
- Local land and property gazetteer (database of land and property information)
- Access channels (websites, call centres, kiosks, digital TV, mobile phones, etc.)

==== Socitm Insight Better Connected reports ====
Local authority websites are also subject to assessments by Socitm (Society of Information Technology Management) Insight in their annual Better Connected reports.

== See also ==
- Information Kerala Mission
