= Ukraine Recovery Conference =

Annual international event

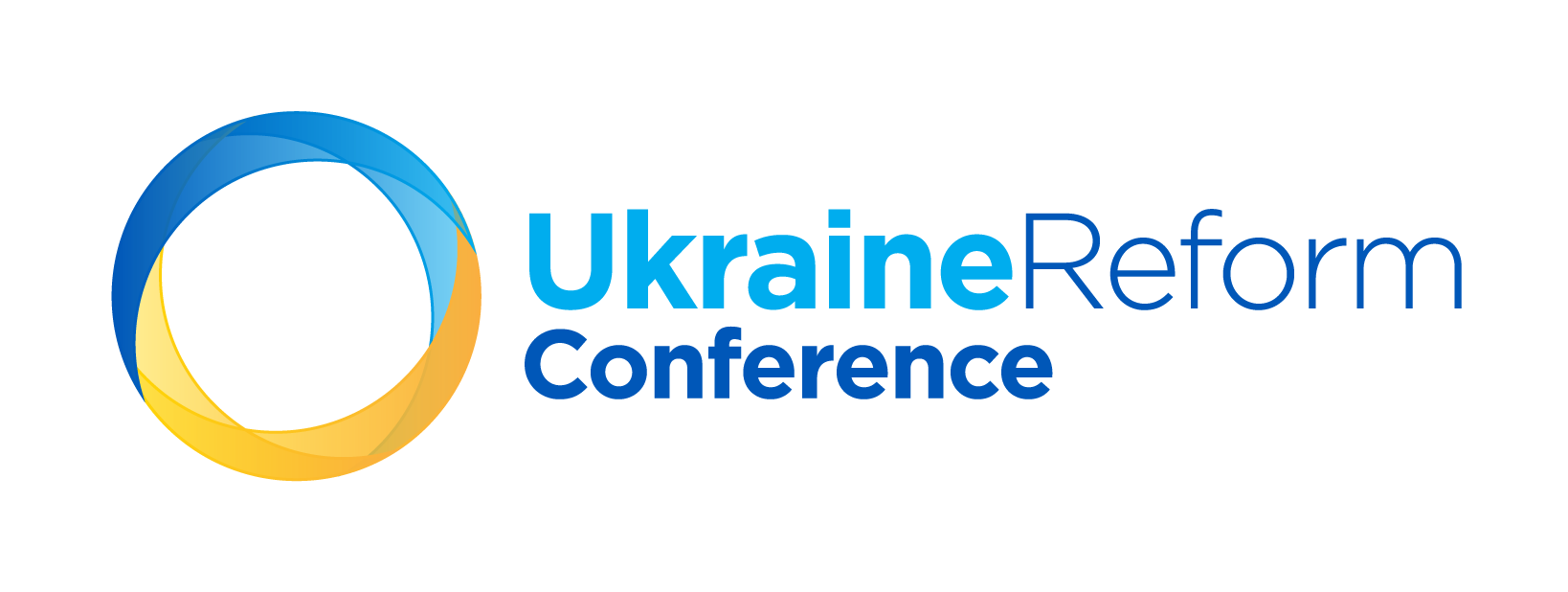
- Pre-2022 conference logo
- Frequency: Annually
- Inaugurated: July 6, 2017; 9 years ago
- Most recent: 25–26 June 2026 (Gdańsk, Poland)
- Next event: 28–29 January 2027 (Tallinn, Estonia)
- Participants: Ukraine and its international partners
- Major events: War recovery, Reforms, National security, Democracy, Economy of Ukraine
- Website: Official website

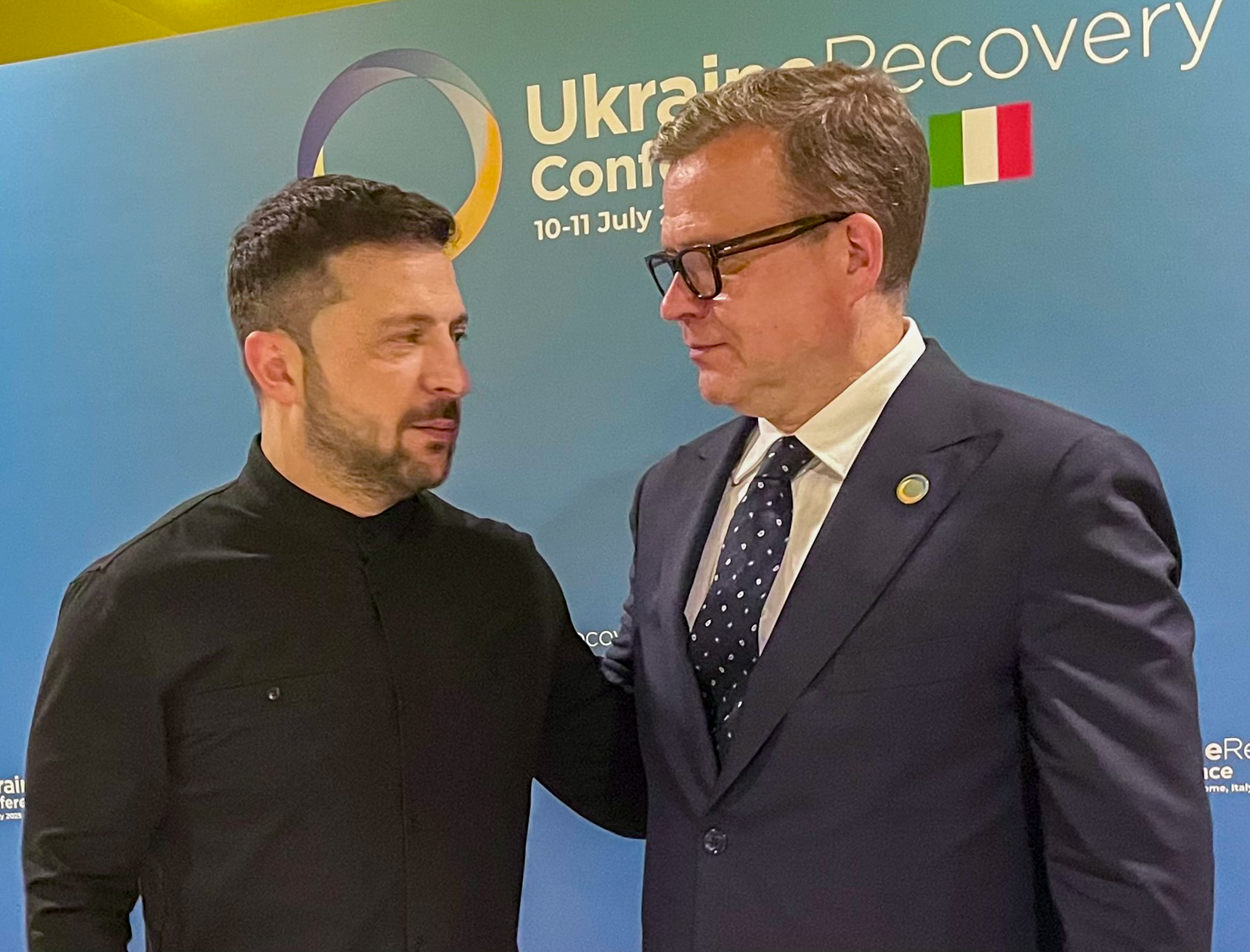
Volodymyr Zelenskyy looks for new partners in Rome, 10 July 2025

The Ukraine Recovery Conference (formerly Ukraine Reform Conference) is an annual international event dedicated to discussions on the rebuilding and reconstruction priorities of Ukraine due to the Russo-Ukrainian War. Prior to the Russian invasion of Ukraine in 2022, the conference focused on international development and assistance within Ukraine, focusing on economic and democratic reforms.

== History ==
Following the 2014 Ukrainian revolution, Ukraine began undertaking reforms to reinforce security and democratic accountability. In 2017, Ukrainian Prime Minister Volodymyr Groysman initiated the first Ukraine Reform Conference as a tool for active engagement and collaboration with international organizations and foreign countries to support and implement reforms in Ukraine.

The Ukraine Reform Conference originally focused on progress with reforms in Ukraine. It began as a conference including Ukrainian and foreign officials, including members of the European Union, North Atlantic Treaty Organization (NATO), The Group of Seven (G7), civil society representatives, members of the private sector, and think tanks. The objectives of the conference were to present results of key reforms in Ukraine, set out the priority of the Government of Ukraine's objectives for the upcoming year, encourage investment in the Ukrainian economy, and engage the international community in Ukrainian reforms.

On 24 February 2022, Russia invaded Ukraine in an escalation of the Russo-Ukrainian War that started in 2014. The 2022 conference was originally planned as the 5th Ukraine Reform Conference. However, the focus and name were changed due to invasion of Ukraine.

== 2027 ==
The 2027 conference will take place in Tallinn, Estonia from 28–29 January 2027.

== 2026 ==
The 2026 conference took place in Gdańsk, Poland from 25–26 June 2026.

== 2025 ==
The 2025 conference took place in Rome, Italy from 10–11 July 2025.

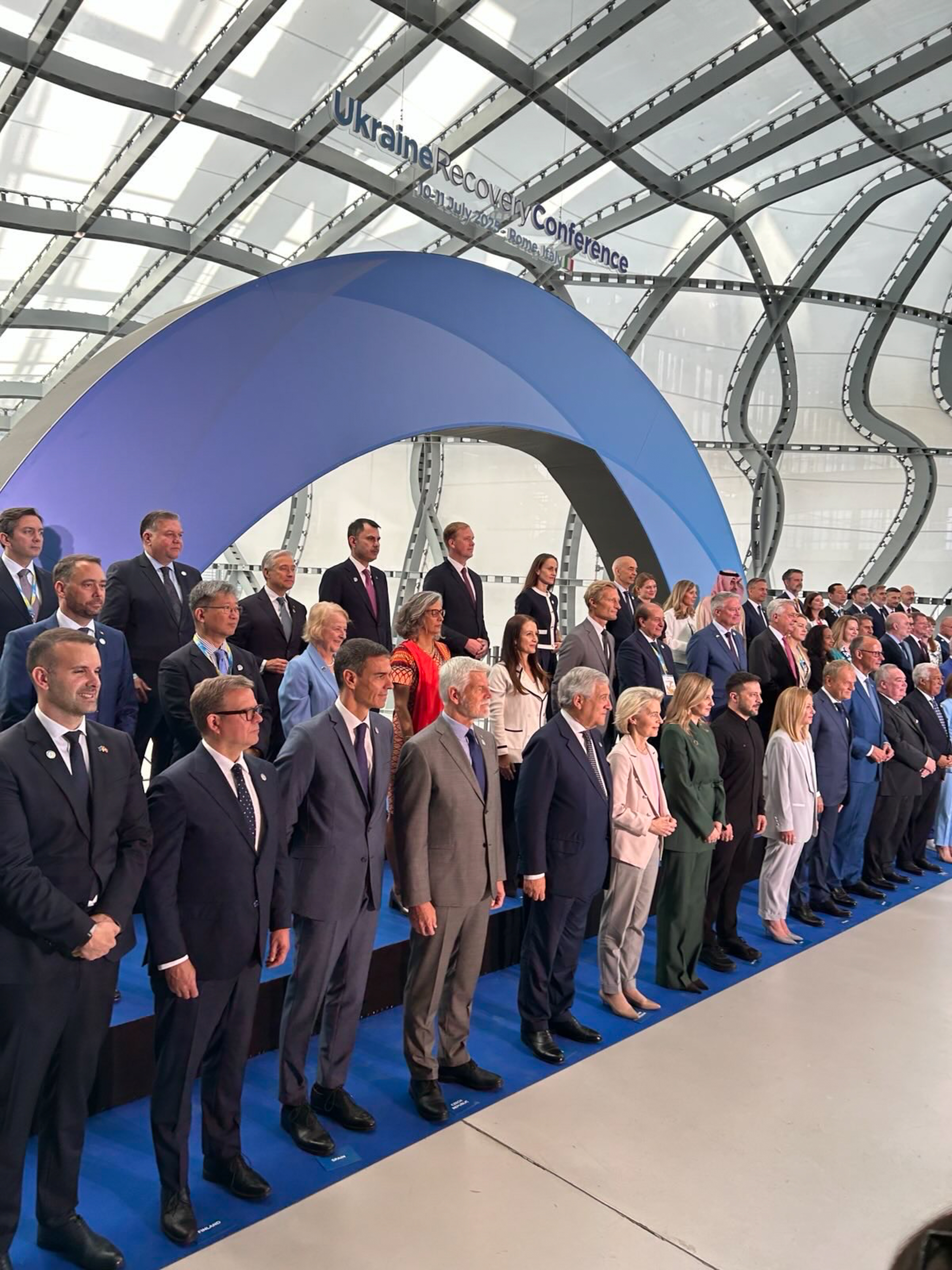
Family photo at URC2025, Rome, 10–11 July 2025

== 2024 ==
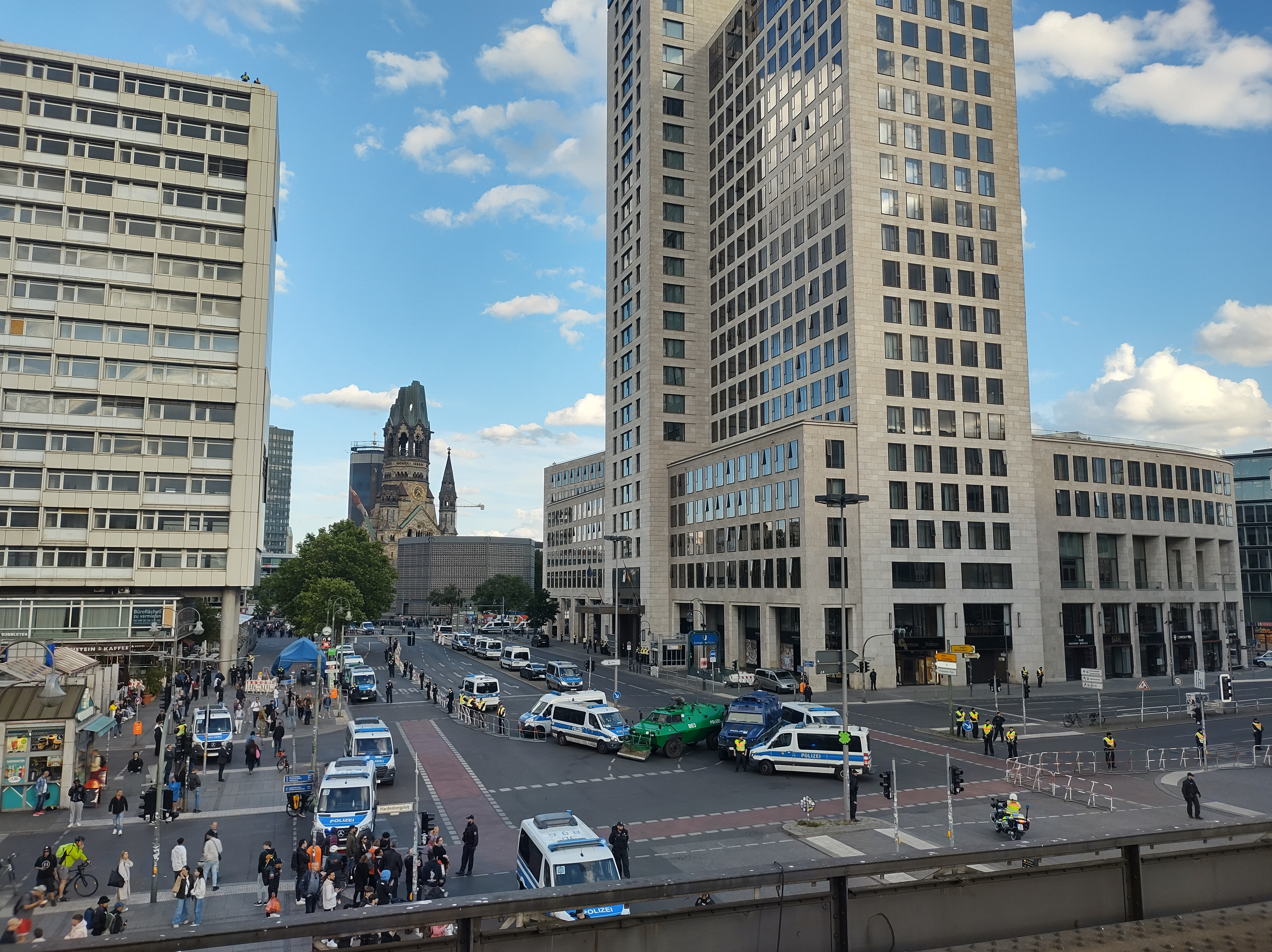
Road closure as Zelenskyy visited Berlin on 11 June 2024

In September 2023, Germany announced it would host the next conference. It took place on 11–12 June 2024 in Berlin.

== 2023 ==
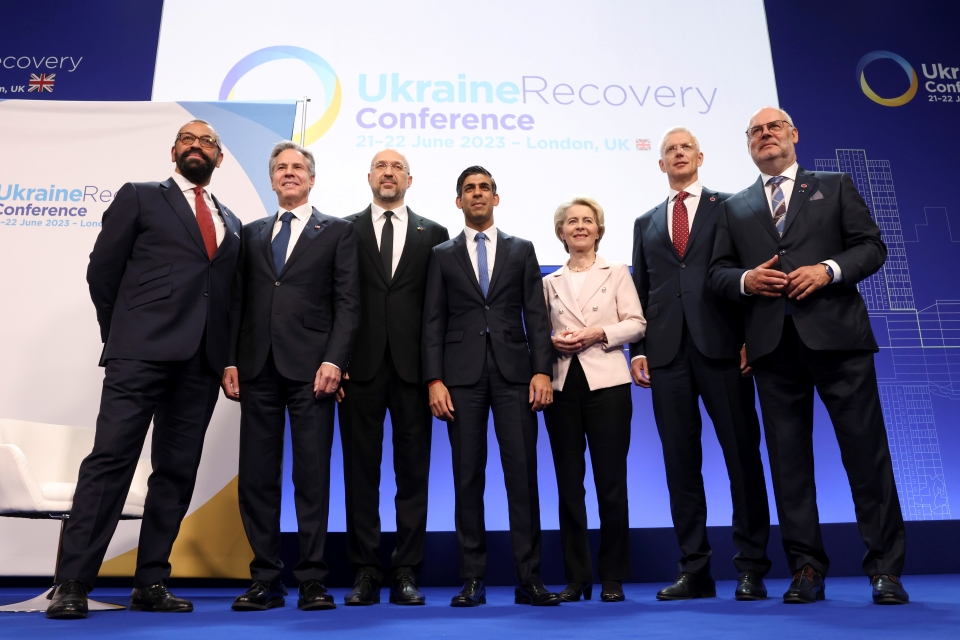
Leaders and government officials at the 2023 conference.

The 2023 conference took place in London, United Kingdom from 21–22 June 2023.

The conference was again attended by high-level international representatives, organizations, and financial institutions. President of Ukraine Volodymyr Zelenskyy again attended virtually via video-link.

During the conference, Prime Minister of Ukraine, Denys Shmyhal remarked that Ukraine was facing the largest reconstruction project in Europe since World War II and requested US$7 billion in aid.

President of the European Commission, Ursula von der Leyen, presented a proposal for a new Ukrainian facility that would provide up to EUR€50 billion over four years to support financial stability, recovery, and implementation of key reforms to assist in the Accession of Ukraine to the European Union between 2024 and 2027.

== 2022 ==
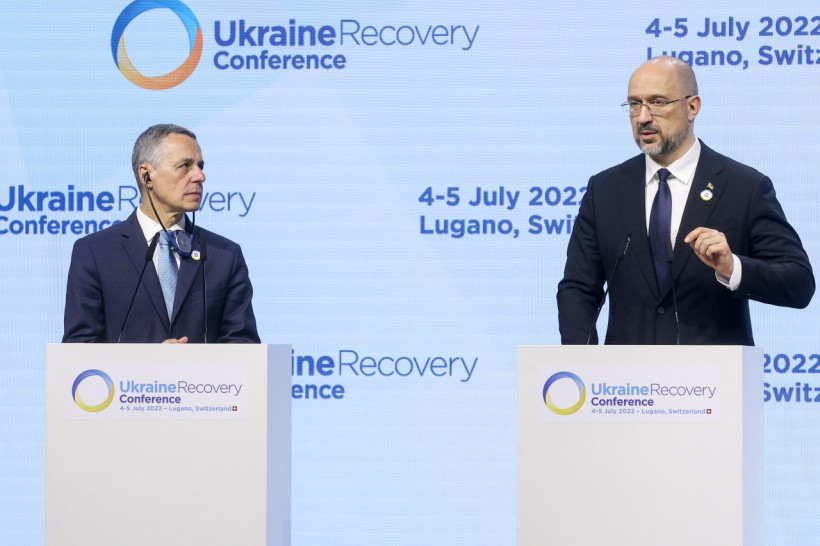
Prime Minister of Ukraine Denys Shmyhal and President of Switzerland Ignazio Cassis during the 2022 conference

The fifth conference was the first conference after the Russian invasion of Ukraine which precipitated a change in name and focus of the conference from the Ukraine Reform Conference to the Ukraine Recovery Conference.

It was a two-day conference held on 4–5 July 2022 in Lugano, Switzerland designed to present the Ukrainian roadmap on post-war reconstruction, including plans to raise funds for the reconstruction of Ukraine. It has been called a “Marshall Plan” for Ukraine. The Prime Minister of Ukraine, Denys Shmyhal, revealed infrastructure losses in Ukraine to be more than US$100 billion. Which included more than 1,200 educational institutions, 200 hospitals, thousands of kilometres of gas pipelines, water and electricity infrastructure, roads, and railways which had been destroyed or damaged.

During the conference, a draft framework was presented for the post-war recovery of Ukraine. Using input from 2,000 experts, the framework was separated into three stages with an estimated reconstruction cost of US$750 billion.

The draft framework included the following steps for the reconstruction of Ukraine:

1. Emergency humanitarian help, including water supplies and bridges.
2. From 2023 to 2025, reconstruct schools, hospitals, and homes.
3. From 2026 to 2032, modernization to a green economy that leaves the Soviet era, and prepares Ukraine for EU membership.

The conference resulted in a "Lugano Declaration" which outlined the following:

- Condemnation of the military aggression of the Russian Federation against Ukraine.
- Urging Russia to withdraw its troops from Ukrainian territory.
- Full support for the sovereignty and territorial integrity of Ukraine within its internationally recognized borders.
- Full commitment to supporting Ukraine throughout its path from early to long-term recovery.

It also outlined seven principles for Ukraine's recovery process:

1. Partnership. Led by Ukraine in partnership with international partners.
2. Reform focus. Focus on reform efforts in line with Ukraine's European path.
3. Transparency, accountability, and rule of law.
4. Democratic participation.
5. Multi-stakeholder engagement.
6. Gender equality and inclusion.
7. Sustainability.

The declaration was signed by heads of state and government, ministers and high representatives of Albania, Australia, Austria, Belgium, Greece, Denmark, Estonia, Israel, Ireland, Iceland, Spain, Italy, Canada, Cyprus, Latvia, Lithuania, Liechtenstein, Luxembourg, Malta, Moldova, the Netherlands, Germany, Norway, North Macedonia, Poland, Portugal, South Korea, Romania, Slovakia, Slovenia, Switzerland, the United Kingdom, the United States, Turkey, Ukraine, Hungary, Finland, France, Croatia, Japan, as well as senior officials and high representatives of the Council of Europe, the European Bank for Reconstruction and Development, the European Commission, the European Investment Bank, and the Organization for Economic Cooperation and Development. The United Kingdom also unveiled a large aid package for the rebuilding of Ukraine.

The conference was the first one that President Zelenskyy did not attend in person and instead joined via live video link from Kyiv.

During his speech, President Zelenskyy remarked on the invasion of Ukraine:

Russia's war against Ukraine is not only an attempt to seize our land and destroy state institutions, to break our independence. It is a worldview confrontation. The anti-democratic and anti-European system built in Russia is trying to prove that it is supposedly stronger than all of us: Ukraine, Europe, and the democratic world.

== 2021 ==
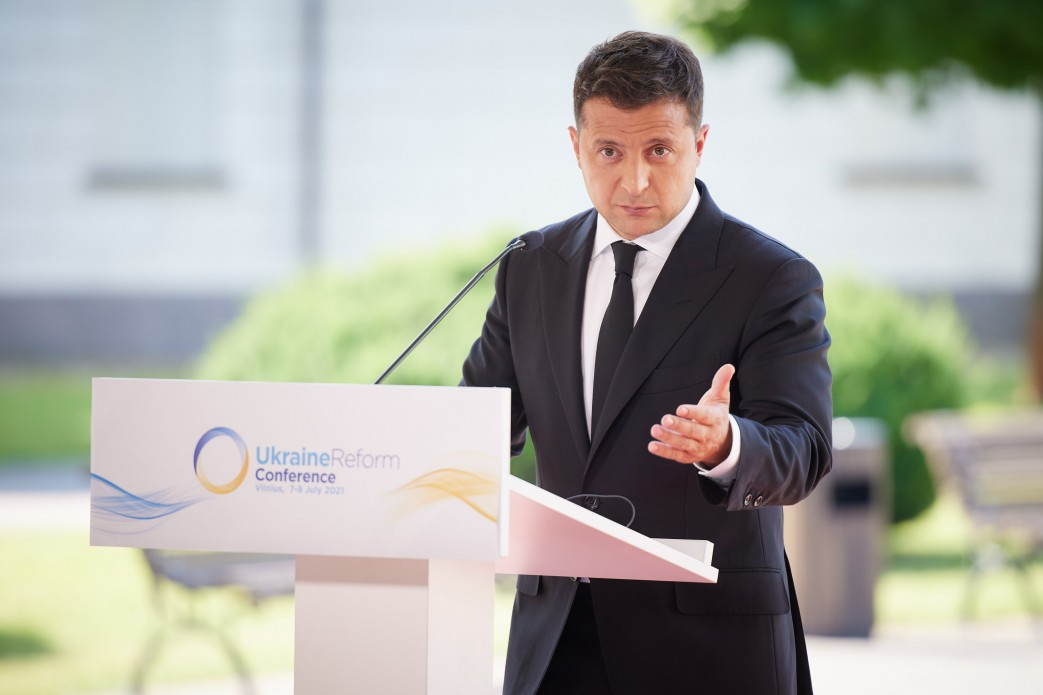
Ukraine President Volodymyr Zelenskyy speaks at the fourth conference.

The fourth conference was originally scheduled to be held on 7 July 2020, in Vilnius, Lithuania. However, due to complications from the COVID-19 pandemic, the conference was rescheduled for 2021.

Both President of Lithuania Gitanas Nausėda and President of Ukraine Volodymyr Zelenskyy attended. Invitees included representatives from the following countries:

- Albania
- Austria
- Belgium
- Bulgaria
- Canada
- Croatia
- Cyprus
- Czech Republic
- Denmark
- Estonia
- Finland
- France
- Germany
- Greece
- Hungary
- Iceland
- Ireland
- Israel
- Italy
- Japan
- Latvia
- Luxembourg
- Malta
- Montenegro
- Netherlands
- Norway
- Poland
- Portugal
- Romania
- Slovakia
- Slovenia
- South Korea
- Spain
- Sweden
- Switzerland
- Turkey
- Ukraine
- United Kingdom
- United States

as well as representatives from the European Union, European Bank for Reconstruction and Development, Council of Europe, the International Monetary Fund, NATO, the Organisation for Economic Co-operation and Development (OECD), the Organization for Security and Co-operation in Europe, the United Nations Development Programme, the World Bank, the European Union Advisory Mission Ukraine, and the European Union Anti-Corruption Initiative in Ukraine.

The conference focused on developments after the 2019 Ukrainian presidential election, the War in Donbas, and policy objectives for the future.

== 2019 ==
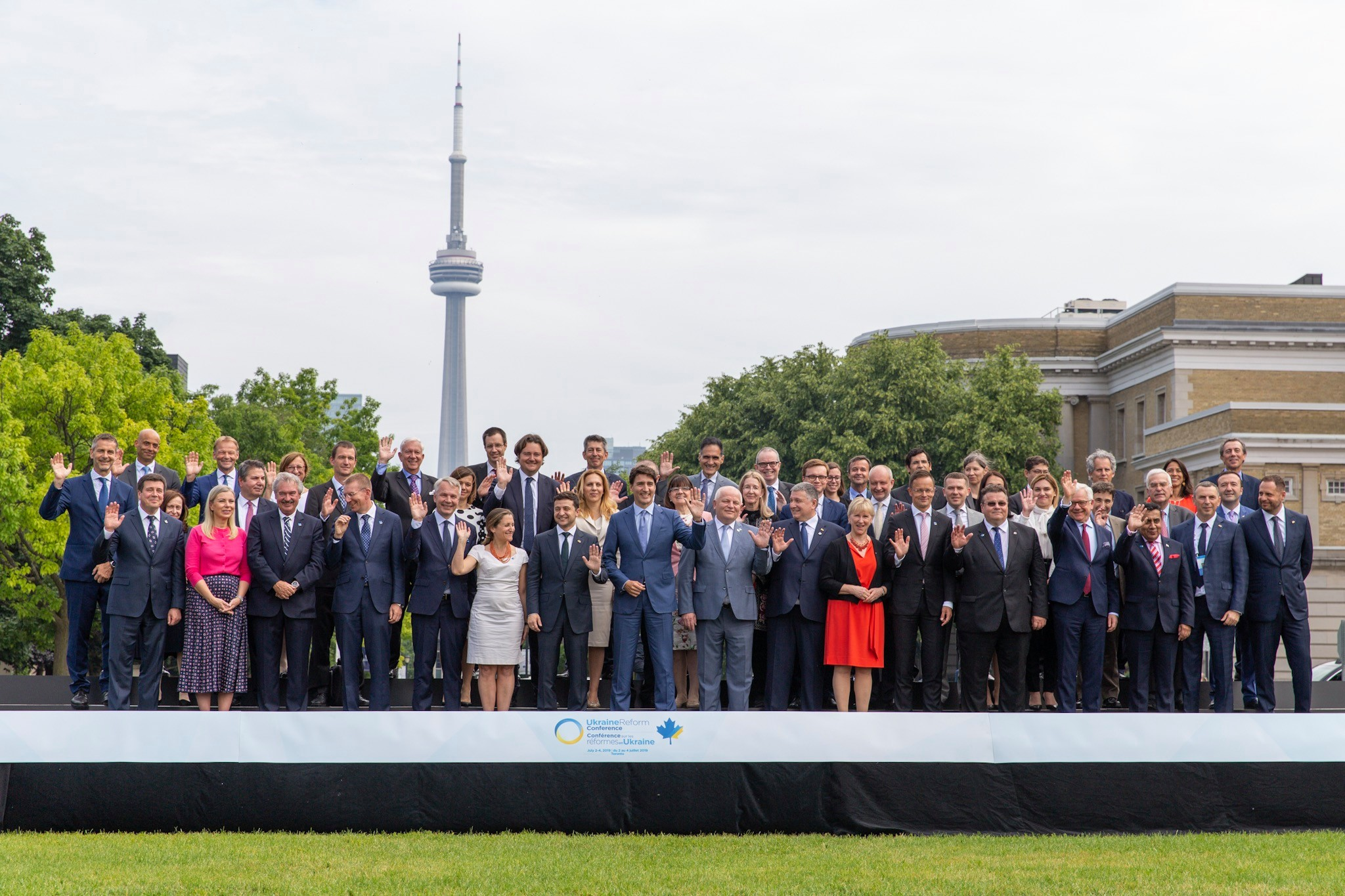
Leaders and officials in Toronto.

Excerpt video from the conference.

The third conference was held on 2–4 July 2019 in Toronto, Canada.

There was more than 800 in attendance, including delegations from 37 countries and 10 international organizations. Among those in attendance included President of Ukraine Volodymyr Zelenskyy and Prime Minister of Canada Justin Trudeau, as well as representatives from the following countries:

- Albania
- Austria
- Belgium
- Canada(host)
- Croatia
- Cyprus
- Czech Republic
- Denmark
- Estonia
- Finland
- France
- Germany
- Greece
- Hungary
- Iceland
- Ireland
- Israel
- Italy
- Japan
- Latvia
- Lithuania
- Luxembourg
- Malta
- Netherlands
- Norway
- Poland
- Portugal
- Romania
- Slovak Republic
- Slovenia
- Spain
- Sweden
- Switzerland
- Turkey
- Ukraine
- United Kingdom
- United States

as well as representatives from NATO, Council of Europe, International Monetary Fund, European Investment Bank, European Bank for Reconstruction and Development, OECD, Ukrainian World Congress, and the World Bank.

Key agenda items included:

- Irreversibility of reforms in Ukraine
- Decentralization reform, its opportunities, efficiency, and results
- Ukraine on the path of integration into the Euro-Atlantic community
- Innovations, opportunities and investing

== 2018 ==
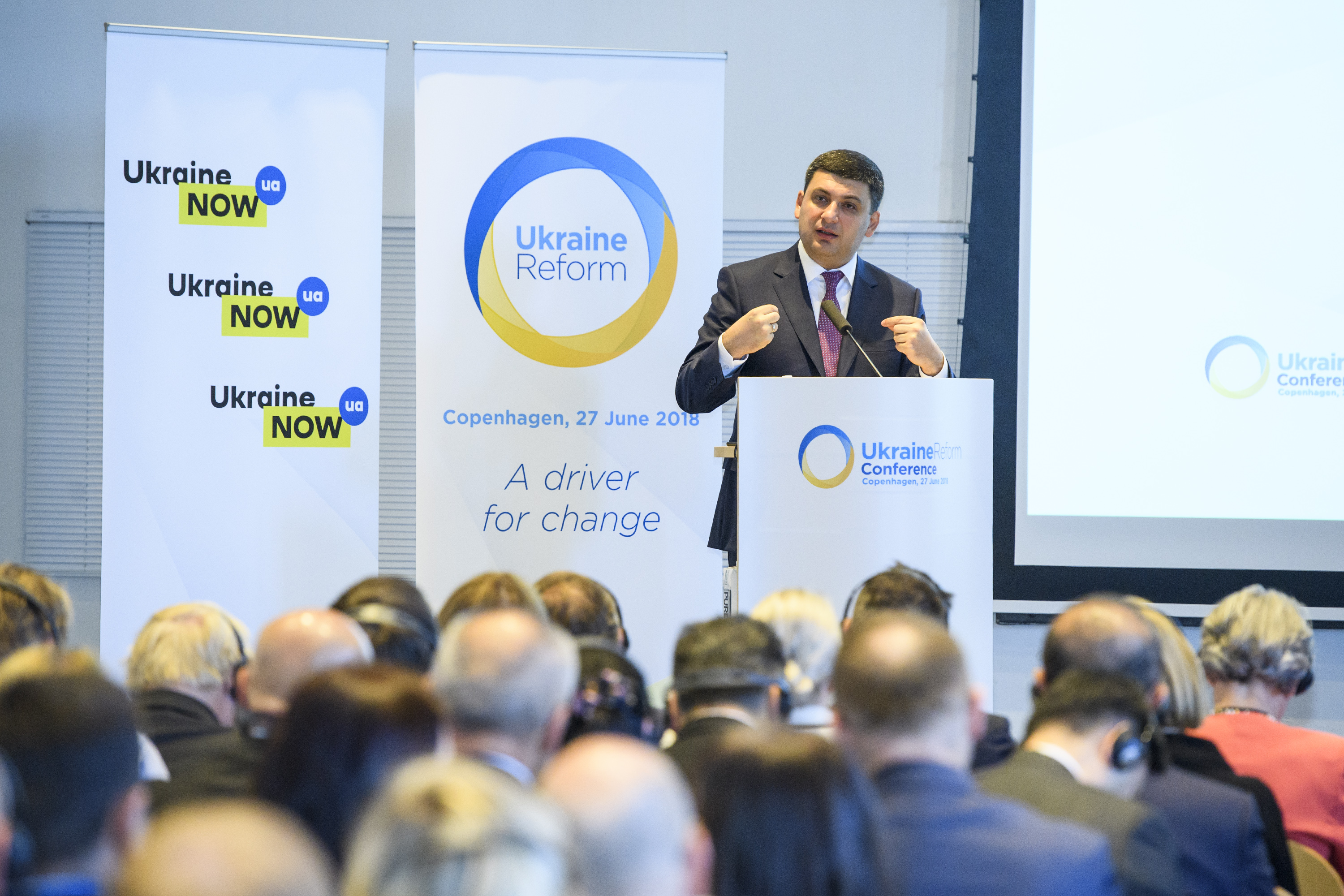
Prime Minister Groysman speaks during the second conference.

The second conference was held on 27 June 2018, in Copenhagen, Denmark.

The conference was attended by:

Country	Representative	Position	References
Ukraine	Volodymyr Groysman	Prime Minister of Ukraine	
Denmark(host)	Lars Løkke Rasmussen	Prime Minister of Denmark	
Canada	Chrystia Freeland	Minister of Foreign Affairs	
Estonia	Sven Mikser	Minister of Foreign Affairs	
European Union	Federica Mogherini	High Representative for Foreign Affairs and Security Policy	
Latvia	Edgars Rinkēvičs	Minister of Foreign Affairs	
Lithuania	Linas Antanas Linkevičius	Minister of Foreign Affairs	
Norway	Ine Marie Eriksen Søreide	Minister of Foreign Affairs	
Sweden	Margot Wallström	Minister of Foreign Affairs	
Turkey	Mevlüt Çavuşoğlu	Minister of Foreign Affairs	
United Kingdom	Boris Johnson	Foreign Secretary	

As well as representatives from the United States, NATO, OECD, and other G7 and European countries.

The conference focused on affirming the international partnership with and support for a free and reformed Ukraine, and topics of good governance, economic development, and objectives for 2018–2019. Objectives included privatization of state owned enterprises, improved corporate governance, improving the business climate, land market reform, decentralization, anti-corruption, energy sector reform, infrastructure development, public administration reform and innovation and digital development.

Prime Minister Groysman indicated Ukraine will continue to implement policies further align and deepen cooperation with the European Union. The Deep and Comprehensive Free Trade Area entered into force on 1 September 2017 and provided Ukraine with access to the European single market, which increased trade of Ukrainian foreign goods with EU members states to 41.3%. In 2017, Ukraine achieved more than +2% growth in gross domestic product (GDP) and was estimated to achieve +3% GDP in 2018, and >3% GDP by 2019.

Groysman outlined the following 6 key reform priories:

Reform priorities	Some areas of progress
Pensions	Since 2017, 10.2 million pensions were raised by an average of ₴561.17 (35.7% increase).
Education	Implementation of the "New Ukrainian School" system. Increased coverage for students with special needs. In 2017, teachers’ salaries increased by 50% and an additional 25% increase in 2018.
Healthcare	Multiple laws were passed, including legislation "On Improving the Availability of Medical Services in Rural Areas”, and legislation on medical care for foreigners and stateless persons. A basic implementation of an eHealth system, and an affordable medicine program. Began setting up the National Health Service of Ukraine as a designated national purchaser of medical services.
Public Administration	Online tools were implemented for monitoring government decisions and plans. Creation of a single open government data web-portal (data.gov.ua) for access to public information. Implementation of 35 new e-services. Since 2017, achieved +34 in the Global Competitiveness Index and +7 in the ICT Development Index.
Privatization and State-Owned Enterprises	New legislation passed. Separation of state-owned enterprises(SOEs) into more groups to help triage further reforms. Utilizing Prozorro.Sale, a joint-stock company, to pilot small scale privatization of SOEs in a transparent manner.
Agriculture sector	Several resolutions on land use monitoring and maintenance. New online services. Allocated ₴6.3 billion in the 2018 state budget for agricultural purposes.

== 2017 ==
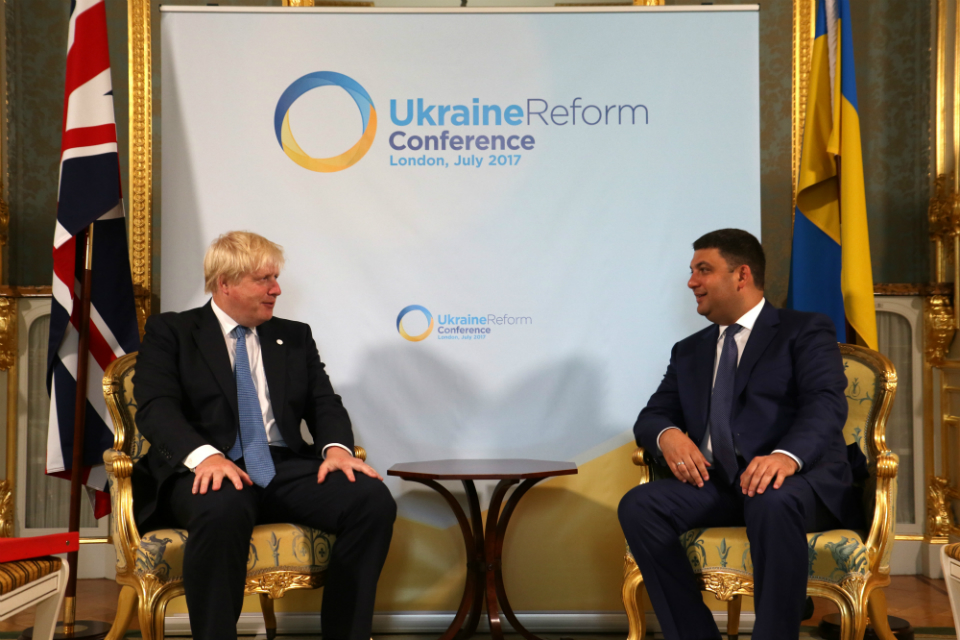
Foreign Secretary Boris Johnson meets with Prime Minister Volodymyr Groysman during the first conference.

The first conference was held on 6 July 2017, in London, United Kingdom. The conference was attended by Prime Minister Groysman, United Kingdom Foreign Secretary Boris Johnson, and more than 30 representatives from international security and financial organizations.

The themes of the conference were economic growth, good governance, human capital, rule of law, anti-corruption, and defence and security. The Government of Ukraine presented its Reform Action Plan 2017-2020, which laid out future reform plans.

Prime Minister Groysman emphasized enhancing Ukraine's defence capabilities in response to aggression from Russia. Groysman remarked that "improving the defense capability of our state is in the interest of the entire democratic world".

Groysman cited two additional areas needing reforms, which included privatization and corruption. For privatization, Groysman stated that new legislation had already been submitted to the Ukrainian parliament to develop a system of transparent and competitive privatization. As well as reforming the judicial system and adopting English law. For corruption, Groysman advocated decentralization and presented strategies for anti-corruption, including the new National Anti-Corruption Bureau of Ukraine and the creation of an anti-corruption court of justice.

== See also ==
- Euromaidan
- European Union–Ukraine Association Agreement
- Ukraine–NATO relations
