= Notification =

Notification may refer to:

- Notification (Holy See), an announcement by a department of the Roman Curia
- Casualty notification, the process of notifying relatives of people who have been killed or seriously injured
- Death notification, the process of notifying relatives of a military person who has died
- Partner notification, the practice of notifying the sexual partners of a person who has been newly diagnosed with a sexually transmitted disease
- Notification, a process of allowing legislation or orders already passed to come into effect, e.g. Australian Capital Territory Legislative Assembly
- Notification system, in information technology, a combination of software and hardware that provides a means of delivering a message to a set of recipients
- Pop-up notification, user interface element intended to communicate events to the user

== See also ==
- Emergency Action Notification, former name of the national activation of the Emergency Alert System
- Notification Center, a message service in iOS
- Notification RD 42 LRD 87 Part III, a 1997 ruling which resulted in the creation of seven new districts in the Indian state of Karnataka
- Notification service, a system for sending a message to many people at once
- Tender notification, an e-mail displaying tendering opportunities
- Victim Notification System, a system updating crime victims regarding the location of the criminals
