= Government contract proposal =

A government contract proposal, often called a government proposal in business, is a response to written requirements issued by a government entity that wants to buy something. All areas of government (national, state/provincial, and local) use written requirements to buy products or services to make purchasing fair and reduce costs. Outside of business circles, government proposal is commonly used to mean a legislative or other proposal by a government, in other words a legislative motion.

Governments request competitive contract proposals when they believe there are more issues than initial cost in buying a needed product or service. In addition to cost, governments often consider issues such as risk (i.e., Will the product or service meet the government need?), schedule (i.e., Will the product or service be delivered or finished in time?), quality (i.e., Will the product or service meet the need each time it is delivered or needed?), long-term cost (i.e., What is the total cost of a product or service over its lifetime?). Most governments use proposals to buy any product that is not a commodity or to buy services that are not routine.

In the United States, federal proposals are governed by the Federal Acquisition Regulation, commonly referred to as the FAR. Most countries have at least some form of purchasing regulations that govern proposals. Regional and local governments have similar laws, although enforcement varies greatly.

Government proposals are written in response to a specific Request for Proposals (RFPs). The RFPs specify the government's requirements for the product or service it intends to buy. In the United States, federal RFPs also specify, in accordance with the FAR, how the proposal should be prepared (Section L in the RFP) and what criteria will be used to evaluate proposals (Section M) Federal Acquisition Regulations. Other countries, states and local governments may also provide requirements for proposal preparation and evaluation criteria, although this is not always the case.

== Government proposal contents ==
Most government proposals contain the following sections:

- Requirements matrix, a pairing proposal requirements with where in the proposal the vendor's response will be found
- Executive summary, a synopsis of why the government customer should buy from the proposing vendor
- Technical/management discussion, a requirement-by-requirement narrative of how the vendor meets the requirements and a discussion of how the vendor will manage the contract if it is awarded
- Cost volume, a presentation of all costs, including the cost basis (e.g., how labor rates were calculated), implementation plan, and implementation schedule
- Past performance/relevant experience volume, detailing performance on past contracts of similar size and scope

Most government proposals require a quality assurance plan, usually synonymous with AS9100.

== Size ==
Because government proposals are always produced in response to written requirements, the proposals are lengthy in order to address adequately each requirement and, in the case of competitive proposals, the vendor's need to differentiate its product or service from other vendors. Short government proposals, including cost data, are at least 10 pages. Large proposals can range up to thousands of pages.

== Expense ==
Government proposals are expensive to produce because of detailed requirements and necessary cost and scheduling information. Experts estimate the cost of producing a successful government proposal to be in the range of 0.5% to 2% of the initial contract value.

== See also ==
- Proposal Theme Statements
- Proposal (business)
