= E-procurement =

Purchase or sale conducted through the internet

E-procurement, also known as electronic procurement and sometimes as supplier exchange, is a collective term used to refer to a range of technologies which can be used to automate the internal and external processes associated with procurement, strategic sourcing, and purchasing.

Examples of e-procurement include e-auctions, e-tendering, automated issue of purchase orders and related receipting and invoicing processes, internet ordering, use of purchasing cards, and the use of information and networking systems such as electronic data interchange and enterprise resource planning systems.

E-procurement can be used across the business-to-business, business-to-consumer and business-to-government marketplaces.

== Scope ==
One Indian project refers to e-procurement as a "value chain", consisting of indent management, e-Informing, e-Tendering, e-Auctioning, vendor management, catalogue management, purchase order integration, Order Status, Ship Notice, e-invoicing, e-payment, and contract management. Indent management is the workflow involved in the preparation of tenders. This part of the value chain is optional, with individual procuring departments defining their indenting process. In works procurement, administrative approval and technical sanction can be obtained in electronic format. In goods procurement, indent generation activity is done online. The end result of the stage is taken as inputs for issuing the NIT.

Other elements of e-procurement can include request for information, request for proposal, request for quotation, RFx (the previous three together), and eRFx (software for managing RFx projects).

== History ==
It was first used by IBM in the year 2000, when the company launched its Replenishment Management System and Method, designed by Mexican communications engineer Daniel Delfín, who was then the procurement director at IBM's largest production plant, and programmed by Alberto Wario, an IT programmer. The system was designed to solve IBM's complex procurement process for the plant in Guadalajara, Mexico, then the largest personal computer production plant in the world, with a production value of 1.6 billion dollars a year. Three years after the system was implemented, the production of the plant grew to 3.6 billion dollars, after which, the company used the system in its secondary production plants, and later sold licenses to external companies around the World.

Jari Tavi identified three stages in the evolution of e-procurement technology: initial systems were functional for procurement professionals but did not address user need; a second generation used web-based technology and aimed to support end-users as well as meeting procurement teams' needs but lacked flexibility and usability. The third generation secured more of the user-focused flexibility and usability which had previously been lacking.

In the European Union, e-procurement for the public sector was first introduced with the Directives 2004/17/EC and 2004/18/EC of 31 March 2004. These directives, which were subsequently revised in 2014, set up the framework for transparent and equal opportunities for public procurement including the mandatory use of electronic communication for publishing opportunities, the standardization of procurement processes, electronic tender submission procedures, handling of objections etc. for all public procurement made in the EU above certain thresholds.

=== E-Informing ===
E-Informing does not directly take part in the purchasing process, this process rather precedes the purchasing. It is the process of gathering and distributing purchasing information both from and to internal and external parties, using the internet technology. Information sharing refers to the extent to which critical and proprietary information is communicated to one's supply chain partner thus more efficiency and high performance of the supply chain. In information sharing, also information quality is considered. That includes accuracy, timeliness, adequacy, and credibility of information exchanged.

This process occurs especially in enterprise resource planning (ERP).

=== e-Tendering ===
Electronic tendering ("e-Tendering") is a process for sending and receiving tenders by electronic means, rather than the old paper-based method. Instead of inserting documents into an envelope and posting them, both parties now exchange the tenders securely via the Internet. It also reduces the time and streamlines tendering operations, making the process faster.

=== e-Auctioning ===
E-auction is the process of conducting an auction to sell assets, natural resources or other goods through online competitive bidding. Compared to physical auction, electronic auction provides complete transparency and enables more parties to take part.

=== Vendor management ===
It occurs when contracting authority aims to control costs, drive service excellence and mitigate risks to gain increased value from their vendors throughout the procurement process. Contract management departments are often established in order to ensure the most effective deal.

=== Catalogue management ===
Catalogue management is a strategic process that starts when suppliers publish their product portfolio electronically and products are made available to buyers in order to procure goods and services electronically, and appears while managing the product catalog to ensure the quality of the product data across the sales channels. The product content can be hosted either by the supplier or buyer.

=== e-Purchasing ===
As opposed to e-Tendering, e-Purchasing is used in procurement of goods and services that are of low value and high volume. It electronically simplifies the purchasing process of such goods and services. For this type of procurement, catalogues are one of the key components that often occurs. Key components of this system are often complex and thus system development is often needed. The process starts from publication of items online by the suppliers, and continues to the electronic selection, order, reception, and finishes with payment by the purchasing side.

==== ERFx ====
In procurement technology, ERFx (or eRFx) is an acronym for electronic request for [x], where x can be Proposal (RFP), Quotation (RFQ), Information (RFI) or Tender (RFT). Other pseudonymous acronyms include ITT (Invitation to Tender) and PQQ (Pre Qualification Questionnaire). All relate to a similar activity: a buyer requesting information from potential suppliers for the purpose of evaluation and comparison. Often this is part of a tendering exercise. The more structured this information is, the easier it is to compare the suppliers. For example, it is more effective to ask 20 multiple choice questions than it is to ask 2 essay questions, as long as suppliers have an opportunity to provide commentary to qualify their answers. Therefore, eRFX software should help the buyer to compare suppliers in useful ways – e.g., apples vs. apples.

=== e-Ordering ===
Process of creating and approving purchasing requisition, both placing purchase orders and receiving goods and services ordered, while using a software system based on internet technology which greatly improves the supply chain performance. When talking about e-ordering, ordered goods and services are generally non-product related, in other words - indirect. In case of Enterprise Resources Planning (ERP) the goods and services ordered are product related. Both the supporting software system as well as ordering catalogue system are designed to be used by all employees of an organization.

=== e-Invoicing ===
E-Invoicing is any method by which an invoice is electronically presented to a customer for payment. In larger companies, accounts payable departments are responsible for the invoices to be approved, processed, and paid.

=== e-Contract Management ===
This type of management consists of management of receivables, payments, contract settlements, contract variations, performance securities, and auditing and control activities, and as opposed to its classical form, e-Contract Management is its electronic improvement.

=== Artificial intelligence ===
In the mid-2020s, artificial intelligence (AI) began to be applied experimentally to public procurement as an assistive technology for accessing, analyzing, and interpreting publicly available tender information. These applications do not replace official e-procurement platforms or legal decision-making processes, but instead support users in navigating large volumes of procurement data.

In 2025, several country-specific initiatives emerged in Europe. In Lithuania, an AI-based interface was introduced to enable natural-language querying and structured analysis of public tender data published through official channels. Media coverage described the initiative as part of a broader effort to improve accessibility to public procurement information, particularly for small and medium-sized enterprises.

A similar AI-supported initiative was launched in Poland in 2025, focusing on summarization and interpretation of public procurement notices while remaining external to statutory procurement systems.

Outside the European Union, governments also explored institutional uses of AI in public procurement. In Albania, a 2025 initiative reported the establishment of an AI-focused public administration role, with public procurement identified as one of its intended application areas.

== In the public sector ==
E-procurement in the public sector is emerging internationally. Hence, initiatives have been implemented in Bangladesh, Mongolia, Ukraine, India, Singapore, Estonia, United Kingdom, United States, Malaysia, Indonesia, Australia, European Union.

Public sector organizations use e-procurement for contracts to achieve benefits such as increased efficiency and cost savings (faster and cheaper) in government procurement and improved transparency (to reduce corruption) in procurement services. E-procurement in the public sector has seen rapid growth in recent years. Act 590 of Louisiana's 2008 Regular Legislative Session requires political subdivisions to make provisions for the receipt of electronic bids.

E-procurement projects are often part of the country's general e-Government efforts to better serve its citizens and businesses in the digital economy. For example, Singapore's GeBIZ was implemented as one of the programmes under its e-Government masterplan. The Procurement G6 leads the use of e-procurement instruments in Public procurement.

An example of successful reform is shown by Ukraine Prozorro. The result of collaboration between Ukrainian government, business sector, and civil society. This system was developed by the international anti-corruption organization, Transparency International Ukraine, with the help of volunteers, NGOs, business community and state bodies of Ukraine, the WNISEF fund, the EBRD and other partners.

== Vendors ==
This field is populated by two types of vendors: big enterprise resource planning (ERP) providers which offer e-procurement as one of their services, and the more affordable services focused specifically on e-procurement.

== Benefits and Disadvantages ==
=== Benefits ===
Implementing an e-procurement system benefits all levels of an organization. E-procurement systems offer improved spend visibility and control and help finance officers match purchases with purchase orders, receipts and job tickets. An e-procurement system also manages tenders through a web site. An example is the 'System for Acquisition Management (SAM)' which on July 30, 2013, combined information from the former Central Contractor Registration and Online Representations and Certifications Application (ORCA), in the United States.

In the case of government procurement, the benefits might be efficiency, transparency, equity, fairness and encouragement of local business. Because e-procurement increases competition, lowers transaction costs, and has potential to minimize time and errors in the bidding process, efficiency is achieved. Because of easier accessibility and openness of the internet, more people can attain earlier pieces of information, which increases transparency. Neutrality to location and time ensures equity and fairness.

=== Disadvantages ===
Because the vendor is obtaining more information about the customer than in case of normal supply chain management structure, major disadvantage of e-procurement might be incentive of the vendor to take advantage of the customer.

== See also ==
- Complex sales
- Construction bidding
- Contract A
- Proposal
- Reverse auction
- Low-carbon tenders
- Tender notification
- Tendering
- Strategic sourcing
- Outsourcing
- Public eProcurement
- Purchase-to-pay
