= UK Open Government National Action Plan 2019–21 =

The UK National Action Plan for Open Government 2019–2021 sets out the UK government's commitments in the areas of open government, anti-corruption and transparency. It is the fourth such National Action Plan (NAP), the first having been published in September 2011.

Participant countries in the Open Government Partnership are expected to co-create a two-year National Action Plan with their civil society organisations. The UK Plan was developed in partnership with the UK Open Government Network.

There are separate commitments for the UK devolved administrations: the Scottish Government, Northern Ireland Executive and Welsh Government.

The Plan was published during the 6th Open Government Partnership Global Summit on 28 May 2019, and the Ministerial foreword was written by Margot James MP, Minister for Digital and the Creative Industries (Department for Digital, Culture, Media and Sport). Previous UK NAPs had been published by the Cabinet Office.

== UK Government Commitments ==
The UK Government NAP 2019–2021 covers 8 commitments:

- Commitment 1: Grants data
- Commitment 2: Public participation
- Commitment 3: Open policy making
- Commitment 4: Open contracting data
- Commitment 5: Natural resource transparency (see also Extractive Industries Transparency Initiative)
- Commitment 6: Innovation in democracy programme
- Commitment 7: Effective knowledge sharing for sustainable Open Government policies and practices across public services in the UK
- Commitment 8: Local transparency

== Previous National Action Plan ==
See UK Open Government National Action Plan 2016–18.

== Next National Action Plan ==
The document stated that the fifth NAP for 2021–2023 would be launched in 2021.
