= GeBIZ =

GeBIZ is a Government−to−business (G2B) Public eProcurement center where suppliers can conduct electronic commerce with the Singapore Government. All of the public sector's invitations for quotations and tenders (except for security−sensitive contracts) are posted on GeBIZ. Suppliers can search for government procurement opportunities, retrieve relevant procurement documentation, and submit their bids online.

== History ==
Singapore's GeBIZ, or the Government Electronic Business Centre, was set up in June 2000 to simplify government procurement and tender activities. It was part of the programs for businesses under the e−Government Action Plan (eGAP I) (2000–2003) in Singapore.

As a one−stop center for suppliers to have access to all procurement opportunities in the public sector and to trade electronically with the government, GeBIZ would create an entry point for businesses to access G2B services in an enterprise−centric manner instead of an agency−centric manner.

== Purpose ==
Beyond direct efficiency and cost savings, having a common e−procurement system for the entire public sector in Singapore resulted in transactions that accordance with government procurement policies (including World Trade Organisation − Agreement to Government Procurement).

Other than having clear and comprehensive regulations (including legal and institutional framework) for the conduct of public procurement, it is also noted that GeBIZ enables greater transparency as all procurement operations, beginning with the announcement of a tender to the awarding of the contract, are published online. As such, local citizens and entrepreneurs benefit from the Singapore government's one−stop e−procurement portal since it helps level the competition to allow small and medium businesses to compete with established vendors whenever an agency invites them to quote.

== Innovations ==
The e−procurement platform used in Singapore has been commercialized by IDA International.

For non−government agencies and businesses that want to adopt the Singapore Government's procurement best practices, the new GeBIZ platform will operate on a Software−as−a−Service platform, enabling businesses to pay according to specified preferences.

== See also ==
- Government procurement
