= Public eProcurement =

Electronic means of conducting public procurement

Public eProcurement is the electronic procurement in the public sector. The term refers to the use of electronic means in conducting a public procurement procedure for the purchase of goods, works, or services. eProcurement provides greater transparency, more open competition and easier communication than non-electronic forms of procurement processes.

== Benefits of public eProcurement ==
The benefits of public eProcurement can differ from benefits of electronic purchasing in private sector. Governments' objectives include not only cost efficiency but also obtaining the best value-for-money because of the high impact of public procurement on the market and the society. Commonly discussed benefits of the eProcurement in the public sector are as follows:

- Transaction costs reduction – Electronic automation of processes is supposed to replace various phases of procurement processed manually. It can significantly reduce wage costs, printing costs and make communication much easier for both contractor and supplier. There have been various studies estimating these cost savings. Potential administrative cost savings estimates are between 58 – 70% in IT purchases.
- Barriers to entry reduction – Electronic auction is a significant factor increasing the probability that the tender will be awarded to a SME company. It is also a significant factor increasing amount of offers in the tender. These aspects might be caused by smaller requirements of electronic tenders on the companies' capacity.
- Corruption control – eProcurement is considered to be suitable tool to prevent corruption as it can make tender process easier to monitor. Electronic tools are also believed to reduce amount of mistakes or errors made by humans involved.

== Phases ==
The term of the Electronic Public Procurement can be defined as the usage of e-Government platform over the electronic resources (Internet and web-based applications) to conduct transactions for purchasing the products and services from suppliers to a public authority's buyers. The following sub-phases of the electronic public procurement process could be identified:

- eSourcing: Preparatory activities conducted by the contracting authority/entity to collect and reuse information for the preparation of a call; potential bidders may be contacted, if admitted by the legal rules, by electronic means to provide quotations or manifest interest.
- eNoticing: Advertisement of calls for tenders through the publication of appropriate contract notices in electronic format in the relevant Official Journal (national/EU); electronic access to tender documents and specifications as well as additional related documents are provided in a non-discriminatory way.
- eAccess: Electronic access to tender documents and specifications as well support to economic operators for the preparation of an offer, e.g. clarifications, questions and answers.
- eSubmission: Submission of offers in electronic format to the contracting authority/entity, which is able to receive, accept and process it in compliance with the legal requirements.
- eTendering: The union of the eAccess and eSubmission phases.
- eAwarding: Opening and evaluation of the electronic tenders received, and award of the contract to the best offer in terms of the lowest price or economically most advantageous bid.
- eContract: Conclusion, enactment and monitoring of a contract / agreement through electronic means between the contracting authority/entity and the winning tenderer.
- eOrders: Preparation and issuing of an electronic order by the contracting authority/entity and its acceptance by the contractor.
- eOrder Status: Preparation and delivery of status information against the eOrder.
- eInvoicing: Preparation and delivery of an invoice in electronic format.
- ePayment: electronic payment of the ordered goods, services or works.

=== eInvoicing ===
eInvoicing allows an invoice to be sent and received by the customer electronically. eInvoicing is currently defined in multiple ways. A simple search finds 3 simple variations: "an invoice issued, received and processed electronically", "an invoice sent by electronic means to the recipient", and "an invoice received by the customer electronically". Driving a single strategy requires a single definition; a common language. The best definition should be customer-centric. The same common language divides the tiers of eInvoicing based on cash management impacts.

- Tier 3 reduces delivery time (e.g. email delivery of pdf versions of invoices)
- Tier 2 reduces delivery time and digitizes the data for easier management by customers (e.g. electronic files (XML, EDI, flat, etc.) which match the sellers sales invoice)
- Tier 1 reduces delivery time, digitizes data and reduces reconciliation time (e.g. electronic files (xml, edi, flat, etc.) which match the customers purchase order, or web invoicing solutions).

== Enabling systems ==
To successfully conduct electronic procurement across borders, eProcurement systems rely on some "key-enablers":

- eSignature: Data in electronic form which are attached to or logically associated with other electronic data and which serve as a method of authentication with regard to this data.
- eIdentity: Dynamic collection of all attributes, in electronic format, related to a specific entity (citizen, enterprise, or object) which serve to ascertain a specific identity.
- eAttestations: (Virtual Company Dossier): set of certificates and attestations, in electronic format, to be provided by a supplier to prove compliance with the selection and exclusion criteria of a procurement procedure.
- eCatalogues: Electronic supplier catalogue prospect used to prepare and submit offers or parts of them.
- eArchiving: use of electronic means for long-term preservation of documents in digitalised format, ensuring that they can be easily retrieved without conversions.

== By country ==
=== Asia ===
==== Philippines ====
In the Philippines, the Department of Budget and Management (DBM) operates the Philippine Government Electronic Procurement System (PhilGEPS), its central online portal for all government procurement activities. In 2024, the DBM launched the eMarketplace, a section on the PhilGEPS website that allows government agencies and other procuring entities to directly purchase private goods from verified suppliers.

The Philippine Daily Inquirer criticized the launch of digital products such as PhilGEPS and its corresponding eMarketplace section as insufficient in minimizing corruption, pointing to the Pharmally scandal and the controversy on the procurement of laptops by the Department of Education. It stated that these systems and platforms must be complemented with constant vigilance from both the government and the Filipino public.

==== Singapore ====
GeBIZ is a Government-to-business (G2B) public eProcurement business centre where suppliers can conduct electronic commerce with the Singaporean Government. All of the public sector's invitations for quotations and tenders (except for security-sensitive contracts) are posted on GeBIZ. Suppliers can search for government procurement opportunities, retrieve relevant procurement documentations and submit their bids online.

==== South Korea ====
As of 2010, over 90% of all government procurement in South Korea was undertaking using the country's centrally administered Korea ON-line E-Procurement System (KONEPS), which had been established in 2002. The OECD describes KONEPS as "an integrated e-procurement system which contributes substantially to the efficiency, effectiveness and integrity of public procurement in Korea".

=== Europe ===
==== European Union ====
The European Union (EU) issued a green paper "on expanding the use of e-Procurement in the EU" in 2010, which positioned e-procurement within a context of a broader, "ambitious e-government agenda" with the potential to "fundamentally transform the delivery and performance of public administration".

==== Germany ====
In Germany, e-procurement solutions must be used for many public procurement procedures. The data generated by these solutions is rarely analyzed because of the "complexity of the technological environment, the need to improve visibility of procurement information and enhance systematic data collection". For instance, the Bundesrechnungshof admonished that the German Defense Ministry procured 84% of its goods and services outside of its designated e-procurement system in 2013.

==== Portugal ====
Beginning in 2009, Portugal implemented mandatory use of electronic systems for public procurement. The government has continued to utilize more pilot programs to continue the implementation of the program in Portugal and to establish the e-procurement process until the contract is awarded in a public procurement deal. The European Union's green paper (see above) refers to a study which compared a series of Portuguese hospital public works contracts let in 2010 following the introduction of electronic systems and a comparable set of contracts let via paper-based systems the previous year, and found that there was an 18% reduction in costs, attributed to the increase in competition due to the use of electronic systems.

==== Ukraine ====
In Ukraine, the government established the Prozorro system in 2014. It was a major innovation for the government as they switched to a more transparent e-procurement system based on OpenProcurement platform.
