= Proposal theme statement =

A proposal theme statement is a technique used in a business proposal to call attention to benefits offered by the vendor to the customer. The concise benefit statement normally precedes discussion of any section of the proposal where the vendor thinks the proposal contains a significant advantage to the prospective customer.

== Example ==
"Low-risk, commercially available software" might introduce a vendor's solution for meeting a customer's need to buy technology that enables quick, relatively cheap authorization for people trying to use a credit card.

The theme statement is set apart from the text it introduces:

Low-risk, commercially available software

"XYZ Corporation proposes to use ID-Check…"

The theme statement always ties the feature of the offer (i.e., ID-Check) to the primary benefit(s) of that feature (i.e., low-risk and commercially available). Other benefits are implied—e.g., low-risk implies lower long-term cost because of the software is proven and commercially available implies lower initial cost because the software is mass-produced.

== Theory behind a theme statement ==
The use of theme statements in proposals is based on a reading comprehension technique called an "advance organizer", developed by learning theorist David Ausubel. The advance organizer serves as the launch point for a deductive logic string, where the primary idea is introduced first, followed by supporting detail in descending order of importance. Ausubel's research demonstrated the technique was particularly effective if the reader had little prior knowledge of the subject material.

== Drawbacks of theme statements in proposals ==
Theme statement in proposals must be carefully constructed. If the assumed customer benefit in the theme statement is not perceived as a benefit to the customer, then credibility is lost. If the theme statement introduces a benefit, but the following discussion does not directly support that benefit, then more credibility is lost. Finally, in concert with Ausubel's findings, theme statements should not be used to introduce sections in a proposal customers already know well. The chances of seeming patronizing or disingenuous are too high.

== See also ==
- Government contract proposal
- Proposal (business)
