= Capture plan =

Business term

In business, a capture plan details the process of identifying, articulating and implementing winning strategies oriented toward capturing a specific business opportunity. It is used to support a bid/no-bid decision (deciding whether or not an organization will prepare a response to a specific solicitation), a bid validation check when a request for proposal is received, and the preparation of a proposal to be submitted in response.

The Association of Proposal Management Professionals (APMP) describes capture plan development as "the process of managing and engaging in the pre-competition phase in an organized way that is designed to increase win potential". Business writer Larry Newman argues that the term's usage increased from the 1990s and that organizations which practice capture planning "win more frequently; win larger, more competitive bids; reduce bid time and cost; and make better bid-, no-bid decisions".
