= UK Open Government National Action Plan 2016–18 =

The UK Open Government National Action Plan 2016–18 (NAP) is the plan setting out the UK government's commitments on transparency, anti-corruption and open government which was announced by Matt Hancock, MP, Minister for the Cabinet Office and Paymaster General on 12 May 2016 at the London Anti-Corruption Summit.

The plan makes 13 commitments:

- Commitment 1: Beneficial ownership
- Commitment 2: Natural resource transparency
- Commitment 3: Anti-Corruption Strategy
- Commitment 4: Anti-Corruption Innovation Hub
- Commitment 5: Open contracting
- Commitment 6: Grants data
- Commitment 7: Elections data
- Commitment 8: Enhanced transparency requirements and revised Freedom of Information Act Code of Practice
- Commitment 9: Identifying and publishing core data assets
- Commitment 10: Involving data users in shaping the future of open data
- Commitment 11: Better use of data assets
- Commitment 12: GOV.UK
- Commitment 13: Ongoing collaborative approach to open government reform

For each commitment, the government has stated an ambition, a lead implementing organization and a timeline.

All countries participating in the Open Government Partnership are expected to co-create a National Action Plan with their civil society organisations. Open Government Partnership guidance states that "action plans should cover a two-year period and consist of a set of commitments that advance transparency, accountability, participation and/or technological innovation".

Following the summit, another nine countries, including Mexico, agreed to apply the Open Contracting Data Standard (OCDS) to specific major projects. The UK will also lead on plans to create a new Anti-Corruption Innovation Hub with Mexico, France, Ghana, Georgia, Switzerland, Afghanistan, UAE, Indonesia and Norway.

== See also ==
- UK Open Government National Action Plan 2019–21
