= Tender notification =

A tender notification is the publication and circulation of procurement opportunities by the procuring entity in various media like: Newspapers, purchasers's own website and government tender bulletin etc. The main objective of wider publicity is to make these opportunities available to a wider supplier community, increase the competition and thus making the procurement process efficient and transparent. In pre-internet era the tenders were published only in the print media but the internet has made it possible to publish the tenders online and make these opportunities available to suppliers globally, on a click of mouse. Though some countries have moved completely to online publication of tender notification, but still there are many countries which are publishing tenders in print media as well. It depends upon the commitment and preparedness of the leadership to make the public procurement efficient and corruption free. The World Bank started bench-marking economies on the basis of legal and regulatory system, which can affect the ability of the suppliers to participate in public procurement process. The latest report from The World Bank - Bench-marking Public Procurement, 2017 assesses 180 economies around the world.

Availability of tender notification on internet gave the birth to tender aggregators. The tender aggregation industry can broadly be divided in two types. One those who collects, collates and process the information from within the country and for the consumption of the suppliers from the same country. The other type is those who collect the tender notification from across the globe and make it available to all suppliers including from their home country. A tender aggregator addresses various challenges like:non availability of data in a structured format, multiple languages and terminologies etc. By making the tender notification information available to a wider supplier community, the tender aggregator plays an important role in making Public Procurement efficient and transparent, thus helping procurement entities spend tax payers' money judiciously.

== Types of notifications ==
=== Direct ===
These are normally opportunities that are sent direct from the system they were created on. For example, if a government institution used a certain brand of tendering software, then this brand would also offer a tender service to notify the user of tenders on that specific system.

=== Repacks ===
Repacks are normally provided by external organizations and software as a service providers. Feeds from multiple sources are combined, collated and then sent out. The aim of repacks is normally to give the supplier as many opportunities as possible on a daily basis.

Normally where feeds from multiple sources are combined, collated and then sent out. The aim is obvious here, to give the supplier as many opportunities as possible on a daily basis. However, due to the information often being second or third hand, some data can be lost in the process, or may become inaccurate as it is passed down the line. The collated information tends include a range of sectors, from construction to healthcare tenders.

== Similar processes ==
A request for tender and request for quotation may be a closed tender where people are invited by a buyer to quote for specific work. From their per-empannelled Vendors or Open Tender. Where any person/company can be invited to submit their Quote or Tender Proposal. A tender notification alerts potential suppliers of open tenders that they then have to register interest in before entering the tendering process.

Invitation to tender is also a similar process to a tender notification. The major difference is the institution or organisation who created the tender chooses whom to invite, often in the form of a closed tender, following the award of the contract the contracting authority can then publish a notice announcing that a contract has been awarded following a closed tender. Different jurisdictions have different names for these notices, in the EU they are called Voluntary Ex-Ante Transparency Notices (VEAT) and in the UK they are now known as Transparency Notices. Outside Europe, similar mechanisms exist. In Canada, an Advance Contract Award Notice (ACAN) serves as a public announcement of intent to award a contract directly, allowing suppliers to challenge within a fixed period. In the United States, agencies must publish a Justification & Approval (J&A) document for non-competitive awards under the Federal Acquisition Regulation. Other jurisdictions, such as Singapore, India, and South Korea, require publication of sole-source awards, though typically on an ex post basis rather than in advance.

== Benefits ==
Tender notifications (sometimes called tender alerts), provide the client with given tender information that they desire. This is often delivered in the form of an email notification, saving the client visiting multiple websites to check for updates on potential clients. Most repacks provide both private and public sector tender opportunities. The idea is that tender notification systems deliver tender opportunities to the company, dramatically reducing the amount of time spent looking for these tenders. Many governments have in the recent years actively published tender information in compliance with the Open Data Contracting Standard (OCDS), freely viewable by the public. With the advent of big data analytics, such public data is processed and presented as procurement spend analytics reports by tender information consolidators. Such spend analytics reports will provide rich insights into government expenditure pattern which the vendors and the government policy makers can use to plan their activities.
