= Prozorro.Sale =

Electronic auction system

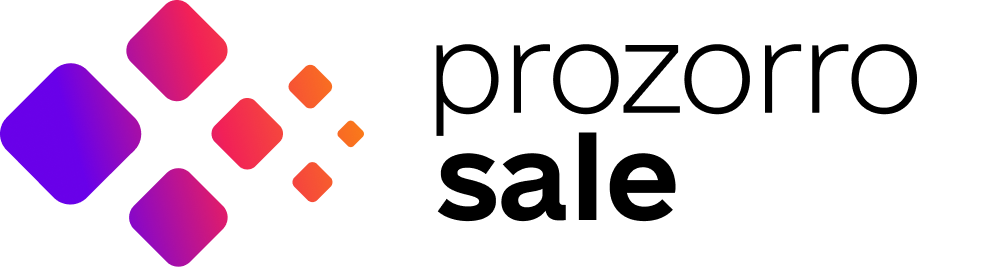
- Formation: 2016
- Type: Online auction ecosystem
- Headquarters: Kyiv, Ukraine
- Website: prozorro.sale

Prozorro.Sale (Ukrainian: Прозорро.Продажі) is a state-owned Ukrainian digital electronic trading system. It hosts online auctions for the transparent and efficient sale, lease, and allocation of government and municipal assets.

It is Open Source, Open-Data, and Public-Private: government core (Prozorro.Sale JSC) + private eMarketplaces.

== History ==
The work on the creation of the Prozorro.Sale system started in July 2016 with support from international donors, including the Western NIS Enterprise Fund (WNISEF). The first transaction was the sale of assets of liquidated banks. At that time, the reform of public procurement in Ukraine proved effective; so, to develop a new project to help sell state and municipal property transparently, the experience of Prozorro was applied.

The system was initiated by the Deposit Guarantee Fund of Ukraine (DGF). In 2016, when the banking system reform got underway, the Deposit Guarantee Fund was managing the assets of more than 90 liquidated banks. Their book value was more than ₴400 billion (US$14.86 billion) These assets had to be sold as soon as possible at the highest value to pay off the millions of the banks' depositors. The law established a 5-year term for this, but the sales model in place at the time did not allow for efficient and transparent management of the banks' liquidated assets.

Therefore, an electronic trading system (ETS) based on the principles of Prozorro was established. A team of specialists from different divisions of the Fund, along with the project office hosted by Transparency International Ukraine, the reform's core partner, received a political mandate to carry out the institutional transformation. The National Bank of Ukraine and the Ministry of Economy of Ukraine supported the idea. On June 24, 2016, the stakeholders concluded a Memorandum of Cooperation to build a transparent and efficient system for the sale of assets of insolvent and liquidated banks in Ukraine.

The first public auction was held in October 2016; since February 1, 2017, all assets of bankrupt banks have been sold exclusively through online auctions in the Prozorro.Sale system

In 2018, with the help of the Kyiv School of Economics, a hybrid Dutch auction was designed and launched. This type of auction helps ensure that assets whose real value is difficult to assess are sold at market prices.

In February 2019, the ETS was transferred to state ownership – to the Ministry of Economic Development and Trade of Ukraine. In January 2019, the composition of the supervisory board of the state Prozorro.Sale was approved.

== Mission and Principles ==
Prozorro.Sale aims to increase transparency in the sale process and the efficiency of state and municipal property management through modern information technology (IT) solutions. It also contributes to Ukraine's development by introducing market mechanisms and digital technologies into state property management.

It is based on two key principles:

- "Golden triangle" of interaction between government, business, and civil society ensures balanced and transparent asset management. The government gains an effective asset-management tool, businesses benefit from clear rules and fair access to assets, and civil society gains the ability to monitor the process and ensure responsible use of assets.
- "Everyone sees everything", which means that all processes are transparent. Auctions are visible on all connected e-Marketplaces and at Prozorro.Sale's website. So, anyone can participate in and monitor auctions. The system operates in compliance with the principles of data confidentiality.

== Management ==
Sergiy Boote (Serhii But) is the chairman of the board of Prozorro.Sale JSC. An independent supervisory board consists of one representative of the Ministry of Economy and three independent experts selected in an open competition.

== Asset types ==
Prozorro.Sale is a one-stop shop for different types of public assets:

- Privatization: state-owned enterprises.
- Toxic: non-performing loans, arrested assets, bankruptcy, and sanctioned assets.
- Surplus: any property, charity auctions.
- Licenses & Quotas: mining, fishing, marine farming, green energy support, etc.
- Lease: land, real estate, other property.

== Auction types ==
Different types of auctions are used for different types of assets to maximize profit:

- English auction – does not fit all asset types.
- Dutch auction – is used if previous English auctions were unsuccessful, or when it is difficult to determine the starting market price.
- Hybrid auctions (preferential right, multiple winners, etc.) – mixed types of auctions, including hybrid Dutch auction specially designed by Kyiv School of Economics used in small-scale privatization, bankruptcy, leasing, and other areas.

== Ecosystem performance ==
As of March 2025, electronic auctions, available on Prozorro.Sale, earned more than US$3.5 billion (₴107 billion), for different budgets, with 45% price increase and 2.3 participants per auction on average.

== Awards ==
- 2017 – Citi Tech for Integrity Challenge (T4I).
- 2018 – C5 Shield in the Cloud award.
- 2019 – Apolitical "Doing More for Less": Global Public Service Team of the Year Award.
- 2020 – World Commerce & Contracting Innovation & Excellence Award.
- 2021 – Open Government Partnership: OGP Impact Award.
- 2022 – UN Public Service Award: Enhancing the effectiveness of public institutions to reach the Sustainable Development Goals (SDGs).
- 2023 – IAM Asset Management Excellence Awards: Digital Innovation (finalist).

== International recognition ==
- World Bank: "The transition to a secure and transparent open-source system in land auctions at the end of 2021 doubled prices and reduced barriers to participation in auctions".
- Transparency International: "transfer of public and municipal property for rent based on transparency and competition directly influences the well-being of the community and the ability to improve infrastructure and comfort locally".
- Open Government Partnership: "Prozorro.Sale turned abandoned assets into productive ones, opening business access to investment opportunities and allowing civil society organizations to monitor the integrity of the transactions, thereby earning more trust in the privatization process".
- OECD: "A special auction method was developed by the Kyiv School of Economics with the aim to reduce the effects of insider knowledge and increase the level of competition, while maximising the sale price. In comparison with other countries that have had similar issues, Ukraine outperformed most in multiple metrics".
- Open Contracting Partnership: "Prozorro.Sale is a pioneering approach to help governments tap into the hidden potential of their assets and generate more revenue for the state. With a radically transparent design, and with open and fair bidding, the online auction system allows government agencies to sell or lease items that were previously impossible or very inefficient to trade".

== Related systems ==
- Prozorro – Success of the public procurement platform Prozorro inspired creators of Prozorro.Sale. These are 2 independent entities, both belonging to the Ministry of Economy of Ukraine, and both have the Ukrainian word Prozorro ("Transparent") in their names.
- Diia – User verification and digital signature.

== See also ==
- Open Contracting Data Standard
