= Request for proposal =

Document that solicits a proposal

A request for proposal (RFP) is a form of reverse auction, initiated by an organisation interested in the procurement of a service or product, that solicits a business proposal from potential suppliers. It is usually part of a complex sales process, and made through a bidding process.

Unlike invitations to tender, which award contracts based upon the price and quality of the tender, RFPs allow suppliers more flexibility in proposing an original service or product in alignment with a company's needs.

Similar requests include a request for quotation (RFQ) and a request for information (RFI), where a customer needs more information from vendors before submitting an RFP. An RFI is typically followed by an RFP or RFQ. When an RFP is made after negotiations with prospective contractors, the submitted tender is known as a BAFO (best and final offer).

== Components ==
A request for proposal requires the bidder to produce an original business proposal based on the buyer's needs. Depending on the RFP document's specification, a bidder may be required to decide upon project expectations, timetable, product design, and vendors. Other requested information may include basic corporate information and history, technical capability, product information.

== Role in government procurement ==
In United States government procurement, Federal Acquisition Regulation 15.203 covers requests for proposals, stating

Requests for proposals (RFPs) are used in negotiated acquisitions to communicate Government requirements to prospective contractors and to solicit proposals.

The FAR allows for evaluation of proposals, further discussions with bidders and invitation for submission of written final proposal revisions (FPRs), upon which a final selection decision is based. Federal government requests for final proposal revisions must

advise offerors that the final proposal revisions shall be in writing and that the Government intends to make award without obtaining further revisions.

The term "request for proposals" is sometimes used in relation to government procurement in the United Kingdom, for example a request for proposals to raise and manage the UK Government's proposed Broadband Investment Fund was issued in June 2016.

== Other requests ==
The collective term RFX is often used to embrace a request for proposal (RFP), or any of the terms listed below.

- A request for association (RFA), also known as request for partnership or request for alliance, is a proposal from one party to another for acting together (usually in business) and sharing the benefits of this joint action.
- A request for expression(s) of interest (RFEI), is part of the EOI (expression of interest) discovery process in order to gather information regarding the potential procurement of the services sought, similar to the RFQ, sometimes done prior to publishing an RFP.
- A request for information (RFI) is a proposal requested from a potential seller or a service provider to determine what products and services are potentially available in the marketplace to meet a buyer's needs and to know the capability of a seller in terms of offerings and strengths of the seller. RFIs are commonly used on major procurements, where a requirement could potentially be met through several alternate means. An RFI, however, is not an invitation to bid, is not binding on either the buyer or sellers, and may or may not lead to an RFP or RFQ.
- A request for quotation (RFQ) is used when discussions with bidders are not required (mainly when the specifications of a product or service are already known) and when price is the main or only factor in selecting the successful bidder. An RFQ may also be used prior to issuing a full-blown RFP to determine general price ranges. In this scenario, products, services or suppliers may be selected from the RFQ results to bring in to further research in order to write a more fully fleshed out RFP. In commercial business practice, the RFQ is the most popularly used form of RFx, with many companies not understanding the distinction between the RFx's, and so defaulting to RFQ.
- A request for qualifications (RFQ) also known as pre-qualification questionnaire (PQQ) is a document often distributed before initiation of the RFP process. It is used to gather vendor information from multiple companies to generate a pool of prospects. This eases the RFP review process by preemptively short-listing candidates which meet the desired qualifications.
- A request for solution (RFS) is similar to a RFP, but more open and general. This allows the vendor or supplier the most flexibility of all RFx in expressing their solution, or their product and service combination.
- A request for tender (RFT), also known as invitation to tender (ITT), is more commonly used by governments.

== See also ==
- Call for bids
- Contract A
- E-tendering
- ERFx
- Funding opportunity announcement
- Outsourcing
- Proposal software
- Qualifications-Based Selection
- Reverse auction
- Statement of work
- Strategic sourcing
- Tendering
