= Prozorro =

Ukrainian public electronic procurement system

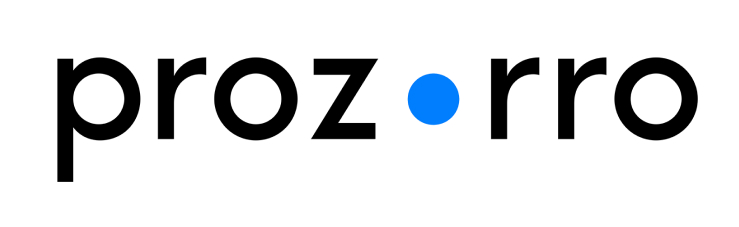
The official logo of Prozorro

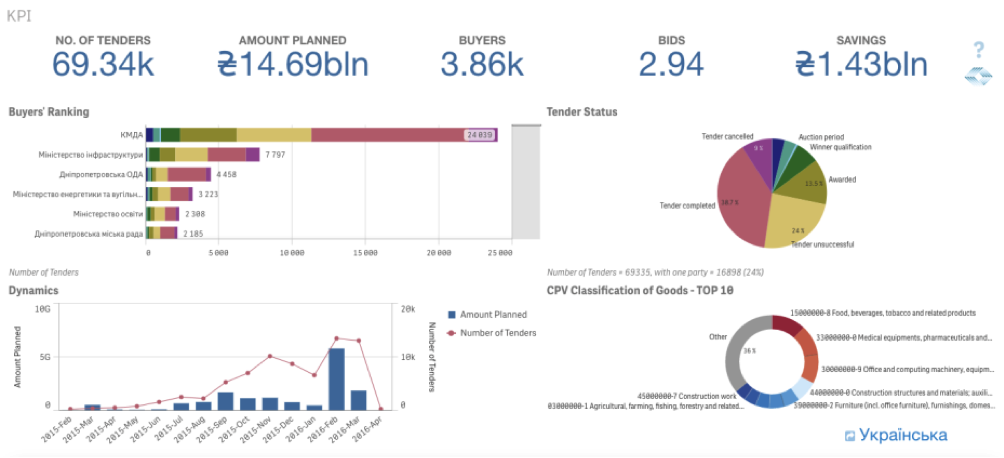
BI analytical module

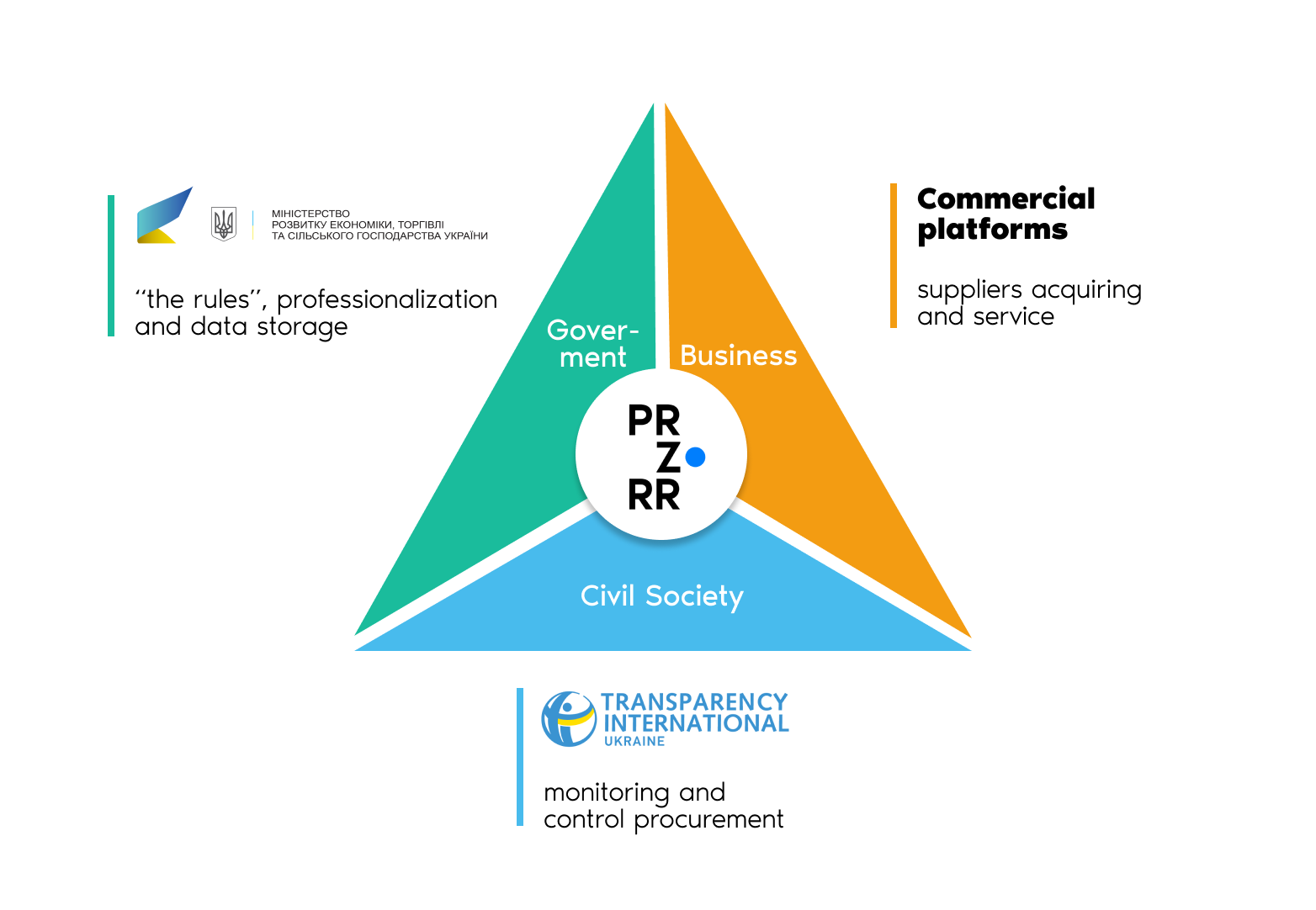
Golden triangle of Partnership

Prozorro (Ukrainian: Прозоро – transparent, clear) is a public electronic procurement system where state and municipal customers announce tenders to purchase goods, works and services, and business representatives compete for the opportunity to become a state supplier.

Prozorro is a result of the collaboration between the Ukrainian government, the business sector, and civil society. This system was developed by the reputable international anti-corruption organization Transparency International Ukraine with a help of volunteers, NGOs, the business community and state bodies of Ukraine, the WNISEF fund, the EBRD, and other partners. During the pilot stage of the project, Transparency International Ukraine was administering the development of the system: the Prozorro central database and several additional modules. Innovative technologies help to ensure the system’s transparency and monitoring: currently, there are the analytics modules Qlik, public (bi.prozorro.org) and professional (bipro.prozorro.org). In December 2015 all ownership and relevant intellectual property rights for Prozorro system have been transferred to the state enterprise designated by Ministry of Economic Development and Trade of Ukraine.

Ukraine, similarly to other developing countries, suffers from ineffectiveness and corruption in the public services sphere. In particular, the public procurement sector's inefficiency brings multi-billion losses. For example, nearly ₴250 billion (over US$10 billion dollars) were spent in Ukraine in 2014 for the procurement of goods, services, and works for public needs. According to international research, the usage of the e-Procurement system saves at least 10% of the procurement budget. Applying simple math - 10B*10%/365 days, 2.7 million dollars can be saved each day.

The Ministry of Economic Development and Trade of Ukraine (MEDT) received support from European Bank for Reconstruction and Development (EBRD) with the drafting of the new e-Procurement policies and legislation as well as implementing e-Procurement solution country-wide.

From April 1, 2016, the Prozorro system is mandatory for central authorities and monopolists, and from August 1, for all other government customers.

== Background ==
Following the collapse of the Soviet Union and Ukraine’s independence in 1991, Ukraine’s political system was extremely corrupt. After its independence, Ukraine suffered an economic slow down which, partnered with excessive crime and corruption, caused further dissatisfaction among its citizens. In 1996, a new currency, the hryvnia, was introduced and the Ukrainian economy steadied, later in this year president, Leonid Kuchma, was criticized for creating a concentration of power in his office and many other criticisms which included being corrupt and discouraging free speech. In 2004 Ukraine had an election following the end of president Kuchma’s second term as president. There were two main presidential candidates - Viktor Yushchenko and Viktor Yanukovych. The win of Viktor Yanukovych, however, was followed by a public outcry and the launch of a peaceful protest known as the Orange Revolution which challenged the results. The election was claimed to have been corrupt, using tactics such as voter intimidation resulting in electoral fraud. International and domestic election monitors reported a rigged election and a re-vote was called. The re-vote confirmed that Yanukovych was not the elected president and Viktor Yushchenko became a president.

In 2010, President Yanukovych won the presidency. He was the president for three years before he was exiled from his post as president and Petro Poroshenko was elected president in 2014.

During the 2013 EuroMaidan revolution activists organized by Olexandr Starodubtsev called for more transparency within the government and its surrounding platforms. This gave rise to many changes being made since then in an attempt to make Ukraine less corrupt and more transparent. This gave rise to Prozorro, the e-procurement system initiated by anti-corruption activists in May 2014. Their idea was to create a place where public agencies could exchange and sell, while the public was able to have access to this information and see who and what deals were being made.

During the Revolution of Dignity, a team of volunteers sets a goal to reform public procurement and make it transparent. As a result, an informal group of activists led by Oleksandr Starodubtsev started developing scenarios for a quick reform of the procurement system in order to implement one of them.

To intensify the reform at the state level, in May 2014, the Minister of Economy of that time Pavlo Sheremeta initiated a working group on public procurement reform at the Ministry of Economic Development and Trade (now the Ministry of Economic Development, Trade, and Agriculture of Ukraine), which included some of the activists. Among them were Oleksandr Kucherenko, Oleksandr Starodubtsev, Lilia Lakhtionova, Tetyana Mishta, Natalia Shymko. Another area was the development of the law on e-procurement by experts and MPs. However, at the end of August 2014, Pavlo Sheremeta resigned. With the beginning of the election campaign, the draft law on public procurement receded into the background.

Dmytro Shymkiv, Deputy Head of the Administration of the President of Ukraine, gave this project a new impetus. He suggested startingthe project for below-threshold procurement, where no additional regulation was required. This approach formed the basis of the pilot, and its core principles were enshrined in the Memorandum, signed on September 9, 2014, in the Ukrinform news agency.

The Prozorro electronic system was developed at the expense of international donors and Ukrainian businesses. Six electronic platforms (SmartTender, NewTend, E-Tender, Derzhakupivli.online, Zakupki.Prom.ua, Public Bid) invested $35,000. Further development and management support were funded by Transparency International Ukraine in cooperation with international donor organizations. And the system itself was developed by the Lviv IT company Quintagroup headed by Myroslav Opyr.

On February 12, 2015, a new IT system was officially presented and launched. And with the adoption of the law "On Public Procurement" in December 2015, the Prozorro system was transferred to the balance of the state enterprise "Foreign Trade Publishing". It was later renamed to Prozorro.

Prozorro will allow adherence of Ukrainian legislature with European standards, giving Ukraine a fair procurement procedure including transparency and effectiveness, bringing Ukraine closer to a European and Worldwide standard.

== Philosophy ==
The corporate philosophy of Prozorro is based on three key principles:

1. Hybrid electronic system based on an open-source model. As opposed to the single and multi-platform systems, Prozorro’s hybrid model allows collaboration between the central database and an infinite number of commercial marketplaces that provide front-end access. Such a hybrid model enables the efficient transmission of information from central databases to marketplaces responsible for attracting and serving clients. Marketplaces compete with each other which motivates them to provide the best service to attract both contracting entities and suppliers.
2. “Everyone can see everything” – is the official motto of Prozorro. After a tender procedure is complete, absolutely all data is disclosed, including the list of all participants, their bids, decisions of the tender committee and all qualification documents, etc. This information is publicly accessible through Prozorro’s online analytics module.
3. Golden triangle of partnership – a unique form of collaboration between business, state and civil society where functions are split between different stakeholders to ensure independence and mutual control. Such partnership aims at promoting change while maintaining a high level of trust between principal stakeholders throughout the course of this reform.

== Implementation ==
Reform and e-Procurement implementation had to start with the preparation of a legislative base. The Law “On public procurement” was designed to facilitate and streamline the public procurement procedure in Ukraine, as well as to incorporate certain elements of the relevant EU law.

The law introduced mandatory electronic public procurement procedures. The transition was accomplished through two phases. Beginning with Phase 1 (April 1, 2016), electronic public procurement became mandatory for central executive bodies and those offices carrying out monopolist activities for “below-threshold” contracts. During Phase 2 (August 1, 2016), public e-procurement became mandatory for all procuring entities.

Prozorro system has used the Open Contracting Data Standard (OCDS) as a key instrument for data modeling, since the information that is available in open data and OCDS formats allows its easy analysis and processing.

Due to the success seen in the public procurement sector in lowering corruption by 25%, Prozorro has been expanded as of February 1, 2016, to include other sectors including sales. This includes the sale of state property, municipal property, small privatized objects, buildings and also involves sales of materials such as scrap metal, raw wood, and so on.

=== Chronology ===
The short chronology of Prozorro looks like this:

- 2014 (March–April) - formation of a team and understanding the subject/area
- 2014 (May–July) - the first concept and the first attempts
- 2014 (August–September) - first challenges
- 2014 (October–February) - MVP programming
- 2015 (March–May) - volunteers' shift to civil service
- 2015 (June–March) - development of the system
- 2016 (April–August) - switching to Prozorro

== Principles ==
The philosophy of Prozorro consists of 3 main components:

- Everyone sees everything. The Prozorro portal shows the entire procurement process: from the announcement to the winners.
- Competition above all. For the first time, public procurement became a competitive market thanks to the Prozorro system. The more bidders, the more competition, and thus the more money of taxpayers saved.
- The Golden triangle of partnership. Prozorro unites and takes into account the interests of the state, business, and civil society.

== Advantages ==
Prozorro has had a positive impact on decreasing corruption in Ukraine's public procurement system. Some advantages include:

- An initially low cost of implementation.
- A low maintenance cost.
- Higher competition among suppliers, all registered suppliers now have an opportunity to make bids.
- Less corruption, due to the public access and transparency of the system.
- In line with European and International Standards allowing access to a larger pool of suppliers and buyers.

== Electronic platforms ==
SE "Prozorro" is the administrator of the database and the auction module. On the second level of the system, there are private electronic platforms (marketplaces) that connect customers and suppliers. Information about calls for bidding is synchronized and available on all electronic platforms and the prozorro.gov.ua portal.

Businesses that want to participate in public procurement, should register on one of these platforms and submit their bids there. It is not possible to submit bids on the Prozorro website.

As of February 2021, the system had 13 accredited marketplaces for below-threshold and above-threshold types of procurement.

Active:

1. zakupki.prom.ua
2. smarttender.biz
3. e-tender.ua
4. izi.trade
5. playtender.com.ua
6. uub.com.ua
7. dzo.com.ua
8. public-bid.com.ua
9. zakupki.com.ua
10. gov.auction
11. zakupivli24.pb.ua
12. newtend.com
13. tender-online.com.ua

In the process of disconnection (did not provide a certificate of a comprehensive information security system):

1. accept-online.com.ua
2. open-tender.com.ua
3. tenders.all.biz

== World recognition ==
- International Public Procurement Award 2016 for the creation and implementation of an electronic system with unique architecture.
- The World Procurement Awards 2016 for the best solution in the public sector.
- Open Government Awards 2016 for the best e-procurement system (Paris).
- The C4F Davos Awards 2017 Communication Award in the Trust of the Future nomination.
- The Fair Sourcing Awards (FSA) 2017 in the "Master" category - for the best procurement system in the world.
- Shortlist of the World Procurement Award 2017 in the "Transformation Award" nominations.
- Global Public Service Teams of the Year 2019 from the global training platform for governments around the world Apolitical - in the category "Doing More with Less".
- The European Bank for Reconstruction and Development has called Prozorro a recommended model for e-Procurement reform.
- Prozorro was chosen as an example for learning Open Contracting Partnership (it is a showcase and a learning project)
- Shortlist for The World Commerce & Contracting Innovation and Excellence Awards 2020. Nomination –– “Innovation in Crisis Award”.
- First place in the Transparent Public Procurement Rating 2020 (97.05 points out of 100 possible).

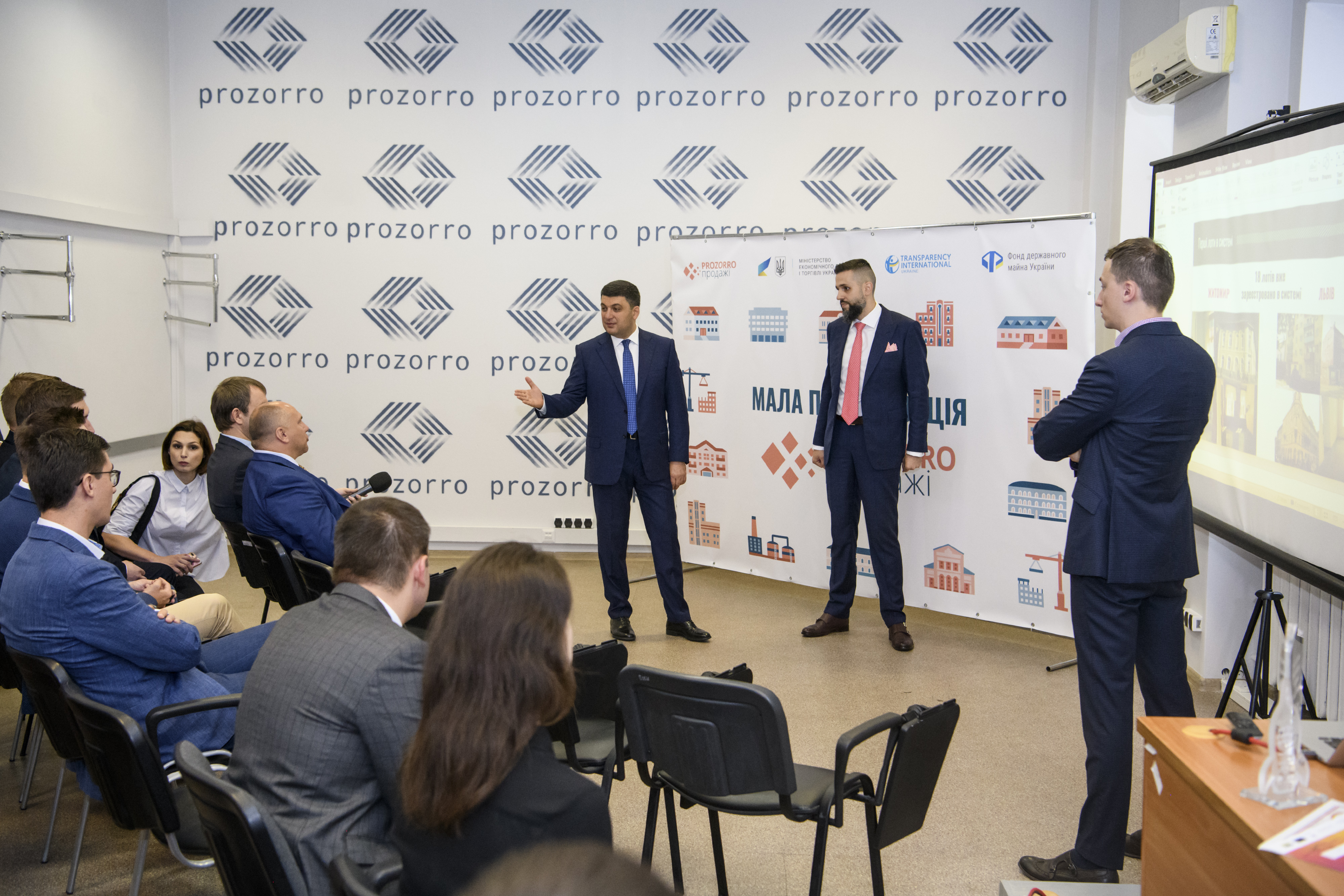
Prime Minister Volodymyr Groysman at ProZorro office in July 2018

== Dozorro ==
Dozorro is Prozorro's end-to-end online platform which allows any participant of the public procurement process - citizens, businesses, public buyers, controlling and prosecution bodies - to monitor particular tender, analyze procurement records, report wrongdoings and appeal the illegal practices. Shortly, it is online public oversight platform for public tenders, launched on November 1, 2016. The platform is administered by the public organization Transparency International Ukraine and consolidates the efforts of 24 regional monitoring organizations. The system collects information on the quality of specific tender procedures through user feedback. In case of detection of violation of the law of Ukraine "On Public Procurement" there is a legal response. The portal contains methodological materials for the self-assertion of violated rights and interests in the field of public procurement. It has its own analytical digital tools: public analytics module, risk indicator system, best practices index. Dozorro's media component contains news, blogs, and special media projects.

== See also ==
- Government procurement
- Procurement
- Open Contracting Data Standard
- Public eProcurement
- OpenProcurement
