= Open Contracting Data Standard =

Open Contracting Data Standard (OCDS)
- Filename extension: .json
- Type code: TEXT
- Developed by: Open Contracting Partnership
- Initial release: 29 July 2015; 9 years ago
- Latest release: 1.1.5; 20 August 2020; 4 years ago
- Type of format: Public contracts format
- Extended from: JSON
- Standard: De facto standard
- Open format?: Yes, Apache License
- Free format?: Yes
- Website: standard.open-contracting.org

The Open Contracting Data Standard is a standards development initiative issued by the Omidyar Network and the World Bank which commenced in November 2014. It sets out the key documents and data which should be published at each stage of the process of letting a contract for the procurement of goods and services for the public sector. Adoption of the standard requires publishers to release data under an open license, because "publishing data under an open license is an important part of open contracting. Without this, restrictions on re-use can prevent many of the important use cases for open contracting information being realized." Publishers are encouraged to use a scale of publishing complexity, from basic which features just tender notices, to advanced and extended data, which features contract award notices, contract details and persistent URIs.

The Open Contracting Partnership, a not for profit organisation promoting openness in contracting, argues that the use of the standard will reduce costs, create more competitive contracting, and prevent fraud and corruption.

== Origins ==
An early version 1.0 was released in July 2015 and version 1.1 was being developed in Q 3 and 4 2015. OCDS was designed with a focus on public procurement of goods, works and services, but it can be extended for use in other contexts. Extensions for Public Private Partnerships (PPP) and Extractives concessions are under development.

== Implementation ==
Pilot implementations are underway in the following countries:

- Canada
- United Kingdom - see UK Open Government National Action Plan 2016-18 The UK Government initially committed to using the standard for contracts administered by the Crown Commercial Service and for High Speed Rail 2.
- Mexico
- Romania
- Moldova
- Ukraine - public e-procurement system Prozorro

Colombia, Costa Rica and Paraguay have also expressed interest in adopting the standard.

Private sector companies using the standard:

- OpenOpps.com.
- OCDS Analytics.

== See also ==
- EbXML
- Universal Business Language
