= Request for information =

Business process

A request for information (RFI) is a common business process whose purpose is to collect written information about the capabilities of various suppliers. Normally it follows a format that can be used for comparative purposes.

An RFI is primarily used to gather information to help make a decision on what steps to take next. RFIs are therefore rarely the final stage and are instead often used in combination with request for proposal (RFP), request for tender (RFT), and request for quotation (RFQ). In addition to gathering basic information, an RFI is often used as a solicitation sent to a broad base of potential suppliers for the purpose of conditioning suppliers' minds, developing strategy, building a database, and preparing for an RFP, RFT, or RFQ.

An RFI may be open, where information is publicly gathered from anyone interested who wants to provide a submission, or closed, where parties are privately approached to provide information.

The ubiquitous availability of the Internet has made many government agencies turn either to state-run or vendor-operated websites which provide listings of RFIs as well as RFPs and RFQs. Many allow vendors to sign up at no charge to receive e-mails of requests either generally or for specific categories of product or service for which there is an interest. The entire process may be conducted online and collects responses as scanned documents or Portable Document Format (PDF) files uploaded to the server. For legal reasons, a response must be sent in hard copy form and/or on CD/DVD disc or USB flash drive by mail or delivery service.

== In the construction industry ==
An RFI is used in the construction industry when a project's construction documentation lacks information that is required to proceed with any given scope of work. It is raised by the general contractor that has been answered by the client, or architect, and distributed to all stakeholders, is generally accepted as a change to the scope of work unless further approval is required for costs associated with the change.

An RFI is common and accepted practice for a subcontractor or supplier to state his/her concern related to the omission or misapplication of a product, and seek further clarification of the building owner's intended use or their official acceptance of the specified product. It is also acceptable for the subcontractor to use an RFI to call attention to an inferior product that may not meet the building owner's needs, and use his/her expertise to recommend the better/correct product.

RFIs were for some years tracked using spreadsheets, but during the early 21st century many companies started using various construction management applications, including document management platforms, to handle RFI processes and help construction professionals save time, reduce costs, and improve quality.

Today, it is common for RFI management software to automatically track every activity related to RFIs and alert all personnel when there are status changes to help increase productivity and avoid construction delays.

== Extended components ==
The exact format of an RFI will vary depending on what information is being requested, but the most common elements found in a construction industry RFI include:

- Objective/Summary
- Timeline
- Storyboard or Screenshots
- Deliverables – The bare minimum
- Evaluation criteria – For any bonuses
- Payment terms
