= Request for quotation =

Request for a quote to purchase products or services

A request for quotation (RfQ) is a business process in which a company or public entity requests a quote from a supplier for the purchase of specific products or services. RfQ generally means the same thing as Call for bids (CfB) and Invitation for bid (IfB).

An RfQ typically involves more than the price per item. Information like payment terms, quality level per item or contract length may be requested during the bidding process.

To receive correct quotes, RfQs often include the specifications of the items/services to make sure all the suppliers are bidding on the same item/service. Logically, the more detailed the specifications, the more accurate the quote will be and comparable to the other suppliers. Another reason for being detailed in sending out an RfQ is that the specifications could be used as legal binding documentation for the suppliers.

The ubiquitous availability of the Internet has made many government agencies turn either to state-run or vendor operated websites which provide listings of RfQs as well as RfIs and RfPs. Many allow vendors to sign up at no charge to receive e-mails of requests either generally or for specific categories of product or service for which there is an interest. In some cases, the entire process is done on-line with responses as scanned documents or PDF files uploaded to the server; in other cases, or for legal reasons, a response must be sent in hard copy form and/or on CD/DVD disc or flash drive by mail or delivery service.

The suppliers have to return the bidding by a set date and time to be considered for an award. Discussions may be held on the bids (often to clarify technical capabilities or to note errors in a proposal). The bid does not have to mean the end of the bidding; multiple rounds can follow.

After the RfQ process, professional procurement organizations have to compare the quotations, and try to get the best price for the job (by negotiations, or by conducting an e-auction (a reverse auction or a ticker auction). Aim is to determine the fair market value of the goods or services and thus generate savings for the company.

RfQs are best suited to products and services that are as standardized and as commoditized as possible, as this makes each supplier's quote comparable. In practice, many businesses use an RfQ where an RfT or RfI would be more appropriate.

An RfQ allows different contractors to provide a quotation, among which the best will be selected. It also makes the potential for competitive bidding a lot higher, since the suppliers could be quite certain that they are not the only ones bidding for the products.

Requests for quotations are most commonly used in the business environment but can also be found being applied to domestic markets.

== Industry specific RFQs ==
=== Market research ===
Here is the list of specifications that are typically included in requests for studies in the market research industry:

- Research Methodology (e.g., Conjoint Study, Discrete Choice Study, Optimization Study, Satisfaction Tracking, Segmentation, etc.)
- Subgroups – readable bases necessary for statistically significant reporting
- Survey Length (e.g., 1–5 mins, 6–10 mins, 11–15 mins)
- Type of material (e.g., commodity)
- Type of study (e.g., Online, P, CLT, Focus Groups)

== See also ==
- E-procurement – Purchase or sale conducted through the internet
- Request for Comments – Publication of the development and standards for the Internet
- Request for information – Business process
- Request for proposal – Document that solicits a proposal
- Request for tender – Business process
- Reverse auction – Auction with one buyer and many potential sellers
