= Government procurement =

Purchases by a government body

Government procurement or public procurement is the purchase of goods, works (construction), or services by the state, such as by a government agency or a state-owned enterprise. In 2019, public procurement accounted for approximately 12% of GDP in OECD countries. In 2021, the World Bank Group estimated that public procurement made up about 15% of global GDP. Therefore, government procurement accounts for a substantial part of the global economy.

Public procurement is based on the idea that governments should direct their society while giving the private sector the freedom to decide the best practices to produce the desired goods and services. One benefit of public procurement is its ability to cultivate innovation and economic growth. The public sector picks the most capable nonprofit or for-profit organizations available to issue the desired good or service to the taxpayers. This produces competition within the private sector to gain these contracts that then reward the organizations that can supply more cost-effective and quality goods and services. Some contracts also have specific clauses to promote working with minority-led, women-owned businesses and/or state-owned enterprises.

Competition is a key component of public procurement which affects the outcomes of the whole process. There is a great amount of competition over public procurements because of the massive amount of money that flows through these systems; It is estimated that approximately eleven trillion USD is spent on public procurement worldwide every year. To prevent fraud, waste, corruption, or local protectionism, the laws of most countries regulate government procurement to some extent. Laws usually require the procuring authority to issue public tenders if the value of the procurement exceeds a certain threshold. Government procurement is also the subject of the Agreement on Government Procurement (GPA), a plurilateral international treaty under the auspices of the World Trade Organization.

== History ==
Public procurement occurred in Europe in various forms since at least the 18th century, even if it lacked regulations and strict procedures. Nonetheless, the need to regulate public procurement procedures and to constrain the powers of heads of administrative departments began to be deemed necessary as early as the French Revolution (1789). Noteworthy in Italy is the first regulation on public procurements, dating back to the time of the Kingdom of Italy of Napoleon Bonaparte and dated May 1, 1807. This regulation contains many terms and principles typical of modern codes on public procurement.

== Overview ==
=== Need for government procurement ===
Government procurement is necessary because governments cannot produce all the inputs for the goods they provide themselves. Governments usually provide public goods, e.g. national defense or public infrastructure. Public goods are non-rival and non-excludable, which means that one individual's consumption does not diminish the quantity or quality of the commodity available to others, and individuals cannot be prevented from freely consuming the commodity, or "free-riding". Consequently, private markets cannot provide public goods. Instead the government provides those goods and finances them by raising taxes from all citizens.

In addition to public goods, governments often also provide merit goods, such as education or health care. Merit goods are private goods which are rival and excludable and are therefore provided by private markets. Nevertheless, governments also provide merit goods because of reasons of equity and fairness and because they have positive externalities for society as a whole. In order to provide public and merit goods, the government has to buy input factors from private companies, e.g. police cars, school buildings, uniforms etc. This process is called government or public procurement.

=== Scope and impact ===
Government procurement practice impacts on all public works, services and supply contracts entered into by a public authority, and the markets from which these are purchased. Public procurement regulations normally cover all works, services and supply contracts but there may be exceptions. These most notably cover military acquisitions, which account for large parts of government expenditure, some aspects of health care, and low value procurement.

The GPA and EU procurement law allow for exceptions where public tendering would violate a country's essential security interests. Additionally, certain politically or economically sensitive sectors, such as public health, energy supply or public transport, may also be treated differently. Government procurement is linked to economic growth, protection and enhancement of competitive market conditions, policy achievement, and innovation promotion. The United Kingdom's Office of Fair Trading, as it then was, commissioned a review addressing the impact of public sector procurement on competition, which reported in 2004. The review found that

Competition effects from procurement can be both positive and negative. The public sector, by virtue of its overall demand in certain markets, may be in a position to protect and promote competition, for example by maintaining a competitive market structure through deliberately sourcing its requirements from a range of suppliers, by providing incentives to suppliers to invest and innovate, or by helping firms to overcome barriers to entry. It may, however, also restrict and distort competition, e.g. by adopting procurement practices that have the effect of restricting participation in public tenders and that might even discriminate against particular types of firms. Last but not least, the public sector may fail to contribute towards an improvement of competitive conditions where it could in principle do so.

Contract types used in government procurement include fixed-price contracts, cost-plus contracts, time-and-materials contracts and indefinite-quantity contracts.

=== Economics of public procurement ===
The economics of public procurement is an applied subfield of economics that studies how procurement rules and the decisions of public buyers and suppliers determine what is bought and on what terms, whether it is delivered and how well, and how these decisions propagate from individual contracts to firms, industries and the wider economy. It draws on auction theory, contract theory, industrial organization and political economy, and takes the individual contract over its life cycle, rather than aggregate government spending, as its unit of analysis.

The subfield analyses the behaviour of three actors whose choices interact across the procurement process.

1. Centralized procurement designer: a central authority that sets the rules of the system, such as the procurement law, the admissible procedures and the monetary thresholds that trigger them;
2. Decentralized public buyers: the contracting authorities, such as ministries, municipalities or public hospitals, that turn a need into a tender, run the competition and manage the resulting contract; and
3. Firms: the suppliers that decide whether to bid, how to bid, and how to perform once a contract is awarded.

These actors meet across five stages that together form a procurement cycle.

1. Demand planning: deciding whether and what to buy;
2. Tender preparation: writing the specifications, dividing the work into lots and setting the award criteria;
3. Bidding and allocation: firms compete and a winner is selected;
4. Contract execution: the work is delivered, monitored and, where needed, renegotiated; and
5. Economic consequences: the effects that outlast delivery, on firms, markets and public value.

The stages are interrelated rather than self-contained, so a choice made at one commonly reshapes outcomes at the others: how a tender is written, for instance, shapes who competes for it and how well the contract is ultimately performed.

A central organising concept is the public procurement wedge, which arises across these stages. It is the gap between the value an efficient procurement process could deliver and the value procurement actually realises; rather than being measured directly, it surfaces as poorly chosen projects, weak competition, inflated prices, cost overruns, delays, poor quality and forgone firm growth, and can accumulate from one stage to the next.

The economics of public procurement is an active area of economic research.

== Strategic purchasing ==
One of the consequences of the 2008 financial crisis was an attempt to reduce public spending in order to control public debt. This trend affected government procurement for its significant share in public spending. Therefore, various purchasing strategies were implemented to increase quality and to decrease cost of government procurement. These strategies include public e-procurement, centralized purchasing or framework agreements. A United States federal memorandum issued in 2005 created an expectation that the procurement, finance and IT functions within federal government departments would work together to generate savings through a process of strategic sourcing.

=== Public e-procurement ===
Public e-procurement stands for replacing various phases of public procurement with electronic means. Purpose of using e-tools is reducing administrative costs by automation. E-procurement can also mitigate some barriers to entry for smaller suppliers, consequent increase of competition can reduce price of procurement.

=== Public procurement and innovation ===
The large buying power of the public sector has led to the consideration of using public procurement as a stimulus to foster innovation. The activities of public procurement and innovation intersect in three specific areas: public procurement for innovation, public procurement of innovation, and innovative public procurement. First, multiple studies have established that public procurement for innovation is a viable and efficient tool to stimulate innovation as a demand - side tool in the innovation policy mix. Second, public procurement may also be used to innovate the public sector itself (public procurement of innovation), through the inclusion of "innovativeness" as a procurement goal (often as a secondary criterion). Third, novel procurement approaches (such as eProcurement or Public-Private Partnerships) may be introduced to innovate public procurement processes and entities.

=== Centralized purchasing in public procurement ===
Centralized purchasing means awarding procurement contracts on behalf of one or more procuring entities. This method has been used to gain various benefits emerging from demand aggregation. Centralized procurement can be done by ordinary contracting authorities or established central purchasing body. Centralized procurement is regulated by local legislation. For instance, directives 2004/17/EC and 2004/18/EC are dealing with this issue in the EU. Commonly mentioned benefits of procurement centralization are as follows:

- Final unit price decrease – Higher procurement value coming from demand aggregation can increase buyers bargaining power and decrease final price. Moreover, higher value can attract more companies to bid in the tender, increased competition might lead to better price as well.
- Transaction costs reduction – Key objective of centralized procurement is preventing duplication of some procedures. Contracting units can reduce their transaction costs in cooperating with other entities. This aspect is often considered as most relevant argument for procurement centralization.
- Knowledge sharing – Cooperation in purchasing can also result in sharing best procurement practices. Some central procurement bodies also perform research activities.

Other centralization aspects are often criticized. Discussed drawbacks are often connected to the decentralization theorem stated by American economist Wallace E. Oates in 1972. The theorem claims that a decentralized system is more efficient, because of the information asymmetry between local and central government. Procurement centralization might also negatively impact supply side. Higher procured values might require higher capacity of supplying company and it might create barrier to entry for small or medium companies. Consequently, it might lead to monopolizing public procurement market. Critics also mention that only some goods can be purchased centrally. Goods that are heterogeneous or they have many characteristics are not suitable for this strategy.

=== Thresholds ===
Under many jurisdictions, there are certain thresholds in value which oblige procurers to publish tender details and information on contracts awarded and expenditure incurred, and to follow specific procurement procedures. Greater transparency and regulatory compliance are incurred at higher levels of expenditure. For example, the GPA applies to the letting of "any procurement contract with a value that reaches or exceeds the amounts ('thresholds') set in the Agreement".

=== Framework agreements ===
A framework agreement is another method for aggregation of demand. It is a type of two-stage bid tendering procedure, that establishes incomplete contracts awards with one or more suppliers for given period of time. The discussed advantage is an administrative costs reduction again as tender procedure do not have to be duplicated for agreed period of time. On the other hand, the term "Winner's curse" is associated with framework agreement as there is a price uncertainty in time. All of these three procurement strategies are not mutually exclusive. So, framework agreements can be processed centrally through e-procurement.

== Aspirations ==
=== Environmental aspects ===
In the European Union, the commission has adopted its communication on public procurement for a better environment, where proposes a political target of 50% Green public procurement to be reached by the Member States by 2010. The European Commission has recommended GPP criteria for 21 product/service groups which may be used by any public authority in Europe.

=== Accessibility ===
The United States Section 508, as well as the European Commission standard EN 301 549, require public procurement to promote accessibility. This means buying products and technology that have accessibility features built in to promote access for the around 1 billion people worldwide who have disabilities.

=== Cost minimization ===
Government procurement can have the aspiration of cost minimization.

== Challenges ==
=== Corruption ===
A concern with public procurement is corruption; companies have much to gain from bribing public officials to obtain these procurements. In societies where corruption is endemic and enforcement is low, public officials are incentivized to accept bribes due to either necessity or greed. Academic research shows that discretion in procurement decisions is beneficial in countries with a high level of human capital, but is detrimental in low-human capital jurisdictions.

Government procurement involves a high risk of corruption, collusion and unwanted favoritism. An important role in this has the great size of financial turnover and the complexity of many procurement processes in which businesses interact very closely with politicians and civil servants. Often the personal interests of the public officials are not the same as the interests of the public. The vulnerability of public buyers to private subversion has led every country to restrict the discretion of procuring entities in what they buy and pay. But while the regulation of the private sector empowers public officials and enables them to extract bribes in exchange for regulatory relief, the regulation of government constrains public officials. Public procurement regulations reduce the discretion of buyers, typically with the intent of reducing corruption.

=== Fraud ===
Procurement fraud can be defined as dishonestly obtaining an advantage, avoiding an obligation or causing a loss to public property or various means during procurement process by public servants, contractors or any other person involved in the procurement. An example is a kickback, whereby a dishonest agent of the supplier pays a dishonest agent of the purchaser to select the supplier's bid, often at an inflated price. Other frauds in procurement include:

- Collusion among bidders to reduce competition.
- Providing bidders with advance "inside" information.
- Submission of false or inflated invoices for services and products that are not delivered or work that is never done. "Shadow vendors", shell companies that are set up and used for billing, may be used in such schemes.
- Intentional substitution of substandard materials without the customer's agreement.
- Use of "sole source" contracts without proper justification.
- Use of prequalification standards in specifications to unnecessarily exclude otherwise qualified contractors.
- Dividing requirements to qualify for small-purchase procedures to avoid scrutiny for contract review procedures of larger purchases.

Integrity Pacts are one tool to prevent fraud and other irregular practices in procurement projects. The G20 has recommended their use in their 2019 Compendium of Good Practices for Promoting Integrity and Transparency in Infrastructure Development. A major European Commission pilot project entitled Integrity Pacts - Civil Control Mechanism for Safeguarding EU Funds is seeking to evaluate the effectiveness of Integrity Pacts in reducing corruption in 17 EU-funded projects in 11 Member States with a total value of over EUR 920 million. The OECD has published guidelines on how to detect and combat bid rigging.

=== Others ===
One issue of public procurement is the inability of governments to measure economic productivity, because as the size of public procurement systems substantially grows, so do their complexity and influence. Public procurement is heavily embedded in all forms of public sector goods and services, from health care to road maintenance, thus making it difficult for the government to monitor the impacts, positive or negative. Monitoring public spending and its impact is important to reform public procurement, especially when pending economic instability calls for proactive responses. In some cases, if a nation is extremely impoverished, it may not have the necessary funds or a large enough private sector to even procure companies to issue the goods or services to the people. Thus, omitting public procurement as a potential governing practice. Cost-plus contracts can incentivize cost overruns.

== Regulation by jurisdiction ==
=== Albania ===
Albania's Public Procurement Agency (Agjencia e Prokurimit Publik) is a central body with legal and public personality reporting to the Prime Minister, and financed by the State Budget. Its activity is based on:

- Law No. 9643/2006 "On public procurement", as amended
- Law No. 125/2013 "On concessions and public private partnership", as amended, which repealed the previous law "On concessions" (Law No. 9663, dated 18 December 2006), and
- Law No. 9874/2008 "On public auction", as amended.

The main duties and competencies of the Public Procurement Agency are:

- preparation of project-proposals for public procurement regulations, public auctions and those in the field of concessions/public private partnerships, preparation of Standard Tender Documents and issuing the necessary instructions in order to assist the contracting authorities undertaking these procedures;
- verification of the implementation of public procurement, concessions and public auction procedures after the phase of contract signature and in case of infringements of the legal and sublegal provisions, penalizes with fines or proposes administrative measures;
- monitoring the progress of the public procurement system, and the implementation of measures and activities in order to achieve and maintain a completely transparent and efficient system of concessions/public private partnerships;
- preparation and publication of the Public Notices Bulletin;
- exclusion of economic operators from participation in public procurement, concessions or public auctions for a period of 1 to 3 years;
- promotion and organisation of training for central and local government officials involved in public procurement activities.

The Public Procurement Commission (PPC in English, KPP in Albanian) is a quasi-judicial state body with responsibility for providing legal protection in relation to public procurement. The US Department of Commerce reports that businesses "occasionally complain about problems in the technical and financial criteria of contracts, resulting in biased and distorted competition" and that "improper implementation of [Albania's] public procurement procedures" has also been noted as a problem. Albania has observer status with regard to the Government Procurement Agreement and is negotiating accession.

=== Algeria ===
Presidential Decree No. 10-236 of 7 October 2010, supplemented and amended by Presidential Decree No. 12-23 of 18 January 2012, regulates public procurement in Algeria.

=== American Samoa ===
The Office of Procurement, based in Tafuna, is the central authority on procurement for the American Samoa Government (ASG), being responsible for the procurement of all construction, goods, and services including the management, control, warehousing, and sale of stores/inventory commodities contained in its warehouse.

=== Angola ===
Public procurement in Angola is governed by Law No. 20/10 of 7 September 2010, the Public Procurement Law, and Law No. 2/2011 on Public-Private Partnerships in Angola. The Public Procurement Law repealed Law No. 7/96 of 16 February 1996 and Decree No. 40/05 of 8 June 2005. Public expenditure, the provision of services, the leasing and acquisition of goods, and public works contracts regulated through the Public Procurement Law.

=== Argentina ===
Argentina has observer status with respect to the Government Procurement Agreement.

=== Australia ===
The Australian government's procurement activity is governed by the Commonwealth Procurement Rules and overseen by the Department of Finance. The rules were revised on 1 January 2018. States and territories also have their own procurement policies and legislation.

=== Bahrain ===
The Tender Board of the Kingdom of Bahrain, based in Manama, regulates procurement and undertakes procurement activity for the kingdom's public bodies. The Board was established in 2003 under the directives of His Majesty King Hamad bin Isa Al Khalifa. Bahrain has observer status with respect to the Government Procurement Agreement.

=== Bangladesh ===
The Cabinet Committee on Public Purchase (Bengali: সরকারী ক্রয় সংক্রান্ত মন্ত্রিসভা কমিটি) is the Bangladesh government's highest decision-making body regarding public procurement. The Swiss Challenge system is utilised in Bangladesh to procure infrastructure development through public-private partnerships.

=== Belize ===
Belize is a member of CARICOM. Government procurement is subject to the Contractor-General Act, No. 6 of 1993, which received the Governor-General's assent on 5 January 1994. The Act provided for the establishment of the Office of the Contractor-General. The Contractor-General is an independent, non-political appointment made by the Governor-General acting on the recommendations of both Houses of the National Assembly.

=== Brazil ===
Government procurement in Brazil is regulated by a number of different laws with different procedures depending on the importance and the value of the procurement. The most important law about government procurement which contains basic rules of public procurements and administrative contracts was the Law nº 8.666, 21 June 1993, which contained rules for public tenders and for restricted tenders. This law was succeeded by the law Lei 14.133/21, 1st, April, 2021. There are different rules regulating procurement of public services, as Law nº 8.987, 13 February 1995 (Concession and Permission of Public Services); Law nº 12.462, 4 August 2011 (Differentiated Procurement – RDC in Portuguese) and Law nº 10.520, 17 July 2002, which deals with a reverse auction. In the internet field (e-procurement) there are executive orders (Decretos) which regulate public procurement, such as Decree nº 5.450, 31 May 2005 and Decree nº 7.982, 23 January 2013: the latter regulates procedures for specific situations of sharing acquisitions of goods or under portioned delivering.

=== Burkina Faso ===
Burkina Faso's Autorite de Regulation de la Commande Publique (ARCOP), established in July 2008, is the regulatory oversight body which ensures fairness in government procurement processes. Its role is to monitor the execution of all government contracts and it may impose sanctions, initiate lawsuits, and publish the names of fraudulent or delinquent businesses. Decree no. 2003-269/PRES/PM/MEF of May 2003 on the general regulations governing public procurement instituted a new public contracts code which extended the scope of public contracting and provided for improvements in transparency in procurement procedures. Appeals from bidders regarding the contract award process are heard by a Standing Committee on the Amicable Settlement of Disputes (CRAL). The US Department of State has noted that Burkina Faso did not as of 2018 operate a "forced localization" policy and did not impose any "offset" requirements (i.e. stipulations which require that foreign suppliers invest in local production or service facilities in order to be awarded a contract).

=== Canada ===
Public procurement in Canada is regulated on various governmental levels (federal, provincial, and municipal). Most federal procurement is organized by the Public Services and Procurement Canada (PSPC) agency and is governed by a Code of Conduct of Procurement introduced in 2006, in combination with principles laid out in the Federal Accountability Act and in the Financial Administration Act. Public procurement is guided by the principles of fairness, transparency, openness, and non-discrimination and complies with all international agreements that Canada is a member of the WTO Government Procurement Agreement (GPA), NAFTA, CETA, and various bilateral FTAs. Foreign suppliers from member nations of these agreements can bid on Canadian government procurements and are treated the same as domestic suppliers. The principal statutory provisions regulating government procurement are:

- Department of Public Works and Government Services Act (1996)
- Financial Administration Act (1985) and the Government Contracts Regulations
- Defence Production Act 1985 (consolidated version published 2011)
- Federal Accountability Act, 2006 (FedAA): this law amended the Department of Public Works and Government Services Act 1996, creating the position of "Procurement Ombudsman" (called the "Procurement Auditor" when the proposal was announced, and in the original bill). The Procurement Ombudsman delivers an annual report on their work and findings to the Minister of Public Works and Government Services, who then tables the report in both Houses of Parliament.
- The Directive on the Management of Procurement, which has been in operation since 13 May 2021.

In general, bids must be solicited by the procuring department unless estimated expenditure does not exceed $25,000, or $100,000 "where the contract is for the acquisition of architectural, engineering and other services required in respect of the planning, design, preparation or supervision of the construction, repair, renovation or restoration of a work". For contracts above $25,000, tenders are published on the transparent Government Electronic Tendering Service (GETS). A non-competitive procurement process is only used in certain special circumstances. One such area of exception are security-related procurements. In that case the Defence Production Act applies, which allows using a special process and favouring domestic suppliers in acquiring defence supplies and conducting defence. A political scandal regarding the procurement of developers for the ArriveCAN border control software arose in 2024.

=== China ===
During the period from 1949 to 1978, Chinese public bodies acquired the goods and services they required in accordance with administratively directed transactions, whereas since the reform and opening up of 1978, "central planning has started to give way to market forces". Researchers Ping Wang and Xinglin Zhang suggest that for comparative law purposes, it only makes sense to speak of "government procurement" or "public procurement" after the implementation of the 1978 reforms.

The Government Procurement Law of the People's Republic of China, adopted at the 28th Meeting of the Standing Committee of the Ninth National People's Congress on 29 June 2002, is the primary legislation in China. The law allows for "buy local" clauses. The Implementing Regulations of the Government Procurement Law, which supplement and clarify the Law, came into effect on 1 March 2015. Procedures and procurement methodologies are covered by these regulations, along with arrangements for handling queries and complaints, and supervision and inspection, and the Implementing Regulations also pay greater attention to transparency and public participation than did previous arrangements. Regulations on military procurement are formulated separately by the Central Military Commission (Article 86).

The finance departments within each section of government are responsible for the supervision of departmental public procurement (Article 13). Government purchasing of drugs for medical use is centralised and uses a strategy known as "Volume-based Procurement" (VBP). On 26 December 2023, China prohibited the use of computer CPUs made by US companies Intel and AMD within government PCs and servers. The government instead approved 18 processors made by Chinese companies Loongson and Phytium. China has observer status with regard to the Government Procurement Agreement and is negotiating accession: the country's accession application was submitted on 14 January 2008.

=== Costa Rica ===
On 28 September 2023, Ronald Saborío, Costa Rica's Ambassador to the WTO, submitted an application on the country's behalf to join the Government Procurement Agreement.

=== East Timor ===
The Ministry of Finance in East Timor or Timor-Leste is responsible for the oversight of government procurement. The Government uses the Timor-Leste eProcurement Portal for purchasing.

=== Equatorial Guinea ===
In Equatorial Guinea, the procurement system introduced when the country became independent from Spain in 1968 has been described by the World Bank as "obsolete". In 2022 the World Bank proposed a draft law on public procurement and contracts which is intended to address some of the recognised weaknesses in the country's procedures and regulations.

=== Eritrea ===
The Government of the State of Eritrea received financing in 2020 from the African Development Bank to support a "Public Financial Management and Statistics Capacity Building Project". The government has stated that it intends to use part of this funding to appoint a consultant to draft a Public Procurement Law and related documents.

=== Ethiopia ===
Government procurement in Ethiopia is governed by the Ethiopian Federal Government Procurement and Property Administration Proclamation No. 649/2009, which replaced the proclamation on Procedures of Public Procurement and Establishing its Supervisory Agency, Proclamation No. 430/2005. The Public Procurement and Property Administration Agency advises the federal government on "all public procurement and property administration policies, principles and implementation" and provides "technical assistance to the regional governments and city administrations".

=== European Union ===
Government procurement in the European Union accounts for more than EUR 2.2 trillion, or 14% of the EU GDP. It has been regulated and harmonized by community law since the 1970s in order to guarantee transparency and non-discrimination of EU companies in government procurement in all member states. EU laws apply only to tenders that exceed certain thresholds in value. These thresholds vary depending on the area the contract is for and if the procurement is done by a central government or by other public authorities (e.g. municipal government). National laws are applied for tenders below these threshold values. Relevant EU Directives regarding government procurement currently in force are Directive 2009/81, Directive 2014/24, and Directive 2014/25. Title VII of the EU's Financial Regulation adopted in 2018 governs the procedures to be followed in acquiring goods and services for the EU's own needs. There are five different procedures for public procurement:

- Open procedure: any company is allowed to submit a tender
- Restricted procedure: only companies that have been preselected are allowed to submit a tender
- Negotiated procedure: there are direct negotiations with at least three companies
- Competitive dialogue: if it is not possible to define technical specifications at the beginning, a competitive dialogue with at least three companies is started after which tenders can be submitted. This procedure is applied for complex procurements.
- Electronic auctions: companies that pass a pre-evaluation process can bid in electronic auctions for public contracts.

The EU Directive 2014/24 foresees two award criteria, namely the lowest price criterion or economically most advantageous offer criterion. In terms of contractual forms, the relationship between contracting authority and economic operator can be regulated by a public supply contract, framework agreement or dynamic purchasing system. The European Commission is working on further improving efficiency and transparency in government procurement in the EU with its current public procurement strategy.

==== Austria ====
Government procurement in Austria is regulated by the Federal Procurement Act 2017. The Austrian Federal Procurement Agency (Bundesbeschaffungsagentur or BBG) centralises purchasing activity for Austrian federal agencies. The BBG operates five centres of excellence or "competence centres", covering logistics and supply chain management, total cost of ownership, quality assurance, sustainable procurement, and costing.

For compliance, the Austrian Federal Procurement Office (Bundesvergabeamt) is a permanent body authorised to hear procurement compliance cases where the federal government of Austria is the contracting authority. The Federal Procurement Office is an example of decision-making body with both first instance and last instance (final court of appeal) powers. The Federal Procurement Office has the power to declare that a violation of procurement law has taken place but it cannot award damages: this role lies with the Austrian civil courts.

After the Austrian State Printing House (Österreichische Staatsdruckerei GmbH) was privatised, Austria maintained a legal obligation for federal authorities to award contracts for security printing for documents such as passports and driving licences to the State Printing House without a competitive procurement process. The European Commission challenged this practice as not compliant with the public procurement directives and issued a reasoned opinion to Austria in 2014. As of December 2015 the Austrian government had taken no action to address this matter and the Commission referred Austria to the European Court of Justice.

==== Belgium ====
Belgian legislation on public procurement is set out in the Act of 17 June 2016 implementing the 2014 EU procurement directives. The Laws of 17 June 2016 on public procurement and on concession contracts, and the Law of 16 February 2017 on remedies, failed to meet the EU's transposition deadline (18 April 2016). Royal Decrees issued on 18 April 2017 for general public procurement, 18 June 2017 for procurement in the water, energy, transport and postal services sectors, 22 June 2017 containing new rules on the performance of public works contracts and concession contracts for public works and 25 June 2017, for the award and performance of concession contracts, have augmented the earlier laws.

Article 51 of the Royal Decree of 18 April 2017 includes a "revolving door mechanism", which targets the situation where a person previously working for a contracting authority is now being employed by an economic operator involved in a public procurement procedure established by that contracting authority. In this type of situation the person would be presumed to have a conflict of interest for a two-year period following the termination of his/her employment with the contracting authority.

==== Bulgaria ====
Government procurement in Bulgaria is a critical area in corruption risk. Public procurement contracts have been awarded to a handful of companies amid widespread irregularities, procedure violations and tailor-made selection or award criteria. The Bulgarian public procurement portal reported in September 2016 that since the beginning of 2016, "a total of 15,105 contracts were signed on the basis of public procurement orders".

At the beginning of 2015, the Bulgarian government announced a 130-kilometer extension to the barbed wire border fence along its border with Turkey in order to completely secure the land border. Prime Minister Boyko Borisov described the extension as "absolutely necessary" in order to prevent persons from illegally entering the European Union member state. The Bulgarian Parliament authorised amendments to procurement legislation to allow continued construction of the fence without launching a public procurement procedure "because of the need to safeguard national security".

==== Croatia ====
The first public procurement law in Croatia based on the EU Procurement Directives was enacted in 2001, but a revised legal structure for public procurement was put in place with the Public Procurement Act of 2012, and this was superseded by the Public Procurement Act of 2016, effective 1 January 2017. Public-private partnerships (PPPs) are governed by the Act on Public-Private Partnerships. Two key Croatian institutions are the Public Procurement Office and the Public Procurement Supervisory Commission, established in 2001, now (since 2013) the State Commission for Supervision of Public Procurement (DKOM).

The State Commission is an independent quasi-judicial body with nine members appointed by the Croatian Parliament for a five-year term and accountable to the Croatian Parliament for its work. The High Administrative Court of the Republic of Croatia has jurisdiction over the State Commission in relation to disputes concerning procedure, but there is no right of appeal against Commission decisions. Under Croatian law, procurement procedures must be carried out by authorised representatives of the contracting authority, of whom at least one must hold a valid procurement certificate.

==== Cyprus ====
The Public Procurement Directorate of the Treasury of the Republic of Cyprus is responsible for procurement policy.

==== Czech Republic ====
Government procurement in the Czech Republic is regulated by Act No. 134/2016 Coll., on Public Contracts, signed by the President of the Republic on 22 April 2016. In May 2015, Prime Minister Andrej Babiš was accused of alleged financial irregularities, and accusations from members of the public and from the opposition that he had promoted his own companies relation to government procurement opportunities triggered a vote of no confidence against Bohuslav Sobotka's government, called by the opposition parties ODS, TOP 09, and Dawn. The motion was defeated by 47–105.

==== Denmark ====
Economic operators who are dissatisfied with the conduct of public procurement activity in Denmark may complain to the Klagenævnet for Udbud (Public Procurement Complaints Board).

==== Estonia ====
The Estonian Ministry of Finance is responsible for public procurement policy, drafting the law, providing supervision and consultancy, and maintaining a central Public Procurement Register. The current legislation is the Public Procurement Act of 2017, which came into effect on 1 September 2017, and which operates in conjunction with the Public Information Act of 2000, which regulates the publication of "information concerning public procurements which are being organised or have been organised by the state or local governments". Disputes are handled by the Public Procurements Appeal Committee.

Defence procurement for the Defence Forces, Ministry of Defence, Defence League, Defence Resources Agency and Estonian War Museum is organised by the Estonian Centre for Defence Investment, whose purpose is "to carry out procurement activities through ... professional-quality procurement and to use dedicated funds sparingly and prudently". The Centre for Defence Investment was established by the decree of the Minister of Defence on 9 November 2015 and became operational on 1 January 2017.

==== Finland ====
In Finland the following legislation applies to government procurement:

- Act on Public Contracts and Concession Contracts (Act no. 1397 of 2016, effective 1 January 2017)
- Act on Public Contracts by Contracting Authorities in the Water, Energy, Transport and Postal Services Sectors (Act no. 1398 of 2016, also known as the 'Act on public contracts in special sectors')
- Act on Public Contracts in the Fields of Defence and Security.

A Government Decree on Public Contracts was also in force until 2017. The Ministry of Employment and the Economy is responsible for the preparation of legislation concerning public procurement. The Finnish Competition and Consumer Authority (FCCA) oversees public procurement: section 139 of the Act on Public Procurement and Concession Contracts mandates the FCCA to supervise compliance with public contracts legislation and to provide 'administrative guidance' or if necessary to issue a caution to a non-compliant public authority. The Market Court operates as a specialist court handling public procurement cases. The Market Court's rulings in public procurement cases can be appealed to the Supreme Administrative Court of Finland.

The Act on Electronic Auctions and Dynamic Purchasing Systems of 17 June 2011, which entered into force on 1 October 2011, introduced new procurement procedures, whereby documents relating to procurement would be sent and received exclusively online. This legislation included the use of eAuctions. Electronic procurement is now covered within the 2016 Act on Public Contracts. Transposition of the 2014 EU public procurement directive into Finnish law was delayed after the deadline (18 April 2016) with the consequence that some aspects of the directive were directly applicable from April 2016 until the new Finnish legislation was in place from 1 January 2017. Hansel Ltd. is a state-owned central purchasing body established by the Act on a Limited Liability Company Called Hansel Oy, which operates framework agreements and supports central government departments in Finland with public procurement tasks.

==== France ====
In France, the Department of Legal Affairs (DAJ) of the Ministry for the Economy and Finance (French: Ministère de l'Économie et des Finances) is responsible for establishing regulations regarding public procurement (la commande publique). All currently relevant EU directives have been implemented into national law. The Union des Groupements d'Achat Public (UGAP), based in Champs-sur-Marne east of Paris, operates as the only general public procurement agency in France. Article III of Decree 2016-247 of 3 March 2016 provides that the Direction des Achats de l’Etat (DAE: State Purchasing Directorate) has "exclusive competence in matters regarding the strategy for professionalisation of public procurement".

==== Germany ====
In Germany, the Federal Ministry for Economic Affairs and Energy (German: Bundesministerium für Wirtschaft und Energie, abbreviated BMWi) is responsible for defining laws and principles regarding public procurement. In 2016 Germany transposed the new EU Directives of 2014 into domestic law. Thereby, processes and contracts in public procurement have become easier and more flexible. The Act against Restraints of Competition – Part IV (German: Gesetz gegen Wettbewerbsbeschränkungen, abbreviated GWB) and the Ordinance on the Award of Public Contracts (German: Verordnung über die Vergabe öffentlicher Aufträge, abbreviated VgV) regulate procurement above EU thresholds. Detailed procedures are specified in further regulations, e.g. the Procurement Regulation for Public Works (German abbreviation: VOB), the Procurement Regulation for Public Supplies and Services (VOL), and the Procurement Regulation for Professional Services (VOF). For many contracts electronic procurement is made possible via an online platform.

For public procurement below the EU thresholds there are different regulations. At the federal level national budgetary law applies while the 16 federal German states and some municipalities have their own public procurement laws and regulations. This decentralized system reflects the political decentralization in Germany; however, sub-national level procurement regulations often take national regulations as examples and also ensure competition, non-discrimination, and transparency. Germany's federal decree on contracts for workshops for the disabled (10 May 2005) requires German federal contracting authorities to set aside part of their budgets for contracts which can be awarded to workshops for workers with disabilities.

==== Greece ====
Law 4412/2016 on public procurement and Law 4413/2016 on concessions are the main instruments of Greek legislation governing public procurement. These two laws of 2016, along with earlier reforms introduced under Law 4281/2014 on public procurement law, have radically simplified the previously complex legal regime, repealing numerous previous laws. The European Commission's profile for Greece in its study of administrative capacity in the EU had described the public procurement system in the country as "singularly complex, ... being dispersed among as many as 400 laws, regulations, and presidential decrees". Public contract notices are published in the Central Electronic Registry for Public Procurement (KIMDIS).

The Public Procurement Monitoring Unit (PPMU), established in 1997, part of the Centre of International and European Economic Law in Thessaloniki, provides Greek contracting authorities with "specialised and prompt legal advisory support on awarding public works and technical services contracts falling within the scope of EU Law on Public Procurement". The procurement impact of Greek laws on construction company registration was challenged by the European Commission in 2014 because the legislation divided companies into bandings with a maximum and minimum budget range. This process meant that companies were not able to bid for work outside their financial banding, even though (for projects of a lower value) they had the economic and financial standing necessary to take on the work.

==== Hungary ====
The Hungarian Public Procurement Authority was established by Act XL of 1995 and the current Public Procurement Act (Act CXLIII of 2015) entered into force on 1 November 2015, implementing the 2014 EU procurement directives. The objectives of the 2015 legislation are:

- to secure transparency and public control of the effective use of public funds;
- to establish conditions of fair competition in public procurement;
- to enhance the access of local small and medium-sized enterprises to procurement procedures; and
- to promote environmental protection and the social considerations of the State.

Concession award procedures are also covered within the same legislation, and the fundamental principles set out in Act V of 2013 on the Civil Code, the "ultimate instrument relating to the operation of civil persons and economic organizations", also apply to public procurement. Hungarian law requires public sector contracting authorities to pay suppliers within 30 days of delivery or service provision, and also allows suppliers to collect payments due to them directly from the contracting authority's bank account, where it is verified that the company has performed its contract obligations but the contracting authority has not paid within the deadline.

==== Ireland ====
Government procurement in Ireland is governed by the European Communities (Award of Public Authorities' Contracts) Regulations 2006 and the European Communities (Public Authorities' Contracts) (Review Procedures) Regulations 2010. As of 2025, the Minister for Public Expenditure, Infrastructure, Public Service Reform and Digitalisation with special responsibility for public procurement is Emer Higgins.

==== Italy ====
Public procurement in Italy is primarily regulated by the Public Contracts Code (Codice dei contratti pubblici), established under the legislative decree of 12 April 2006, which is administered by the Ministry of Infrastructure and Transport (Italian: Ministero delle infrastrutture e dei trasporti). The code was reformed in 2016 to implement the new EU directives of 2014 into domestic Italian law. In addition to the code, guidelines from the National Anti-Corruption Authority (Italian: Autorità Nazionale AntiCorruzione, abbreviated ANAC) and decrees from various ministries also apply to public procurement. Most public procurement on a national level is administered by the state-owned company Consip S.p.A. and larger regions have their own agencies for public purchasing. From 1994, article 10(1bis) of Law No 109 on public works stated that multiple undertakings where there was a relationship of control (such as between a company and a subsidiary) could not take part in the same tendering procedure. However, because the "prohibition on simultaneous and competing participation in the same tendering procedure" did not allow undertakings the opportunity to demonstrate that the relationship did not impact on the tendering procedure, the European Court of Justice stated in Assitur Srl v Camera di Commercio, Industria, Artigianato e Agricoltura di Milano (May 2009) that this legislation did not comply with EU law.

The Autorità per la vigilanza sui lavori pubblici (1994–2006) and Autorità per la vigilanza sui contratti pubblici di lavori, servizi e forniture (AVCP) (2006–2014) acted as supervisory authorities overseeing public works procurement, and later covering public procurement more generally. In 2014 this function was transferred to ANAC. Decree No 34 of the President of the Republic of 25 January 2000 introduced earlier rules establishing a qualification system for persons who carry out public works. The five regions with special autonomy (Friuli-Venezia Giulia, Sardinia, Sicily, Trentino-Alto Adige and Valle d'Aosta) can also establish regional legislation regarding public procurement. In case C-3/88, Commission v Italian Republic, the European Court of Justice ruled that arrangements made by the Italian government to restrict contracts for the provision of services to develop data processing systems for Italian public authorities to companies "in which all or a majority of the shares [were] directly or indirectly in public or State ownership", and to include the supply of computing equipment within the services contract, the government had failed to comply with its obligations under Council Directive 77/62/EEC of 21 December 1976 coordinating procedures for the award of public supply contracts, and failed to comply with the principles of freedom of establishment and freedom to provide services in the EEC Treaty.

==== Latvia ====
Government procurement in Latvia is regulated by the Public Procurement Law, effective 1 March 2017, and the Law on the Procurement of Public Service Providers, which came into effect on 1 April 2017. These laws transpose the EU procurement directives; one additional legal provision is that for supplier selection purposes, real estate tax debts are checked where tenderers are registered or permanently resident in Latvia. Public procurement opportunities are advertised on the Latvian Elektronisko Iepirkumu Sistēma (EIS) website, as well as in the Official Journal of the European Union when above the threshold values. The Procurement Monitoring Office within the Ministry of Finance oversees public procurement. A deposit for filing a review application with the Procurement Monitoring Office must be paid, calculated as 0.5% of the estimated contract value, but no more than €15,000 for construction work contracts or €840 for supply and public service contracts.

==== Lithuania ====
Public procurement in the Republic of Lithuania is overseen by the Public Procurement Office (Lithuanian: Viešųjų pirkimų tarnyba), based in Vilnius, under its director, Darius Vedrickas.

==== Luxembourg ====
In Luxembourg, the main policy body for public procurement is the Public Procurement Directorate within the Public Works Department of the Ministry of Sustainable Development and Infrastructure (MDDI). This department is responsible for the regulatory framework, drafting relevant legislation and monitoring its implementation, and also for representing the Luxembourgish authorities in the field of public procurement. A Tender Commission with members drawn from contracting authorities, chambers of commerce and small business sectors undertakes a consultative role in relation to public procurement.

Luxembourg's public sector eProcurement portal (Portail des marchés publics: https://marches.public.lu/fr.html) was recognised by the European Commission in 2008 as a good practice example working to facilitate SME access to public procurement opportunities. The EU 2014 Directives on public procurement and utilities procurement were implemented by the Law of 8 April 2018 on public procurement, which was published in the Luxembourg official Gazette (Mémorial: Journal officiel du Grand-Duché de Luxembourg) on 16 April 2018 and entered into force on 20 April 2018. Procurement in the defence and security sector is covered by the Law of 26 December 2012.

==== Malta ====
The EU Directive on public procurement is transposed into Maltese law by the Public Procurement Regulations, S.L.174.04, 28 October 2016. These regulations also create the Office of the Director of Contracts (Regulation 10), who is responsible generally for the regulation and administration of public procurement procedures in Malta, a General Contracts Committee, whose members are appointed by the Prime Minister (Regulation 64), a Departmental Contracts Committee for each contracting authority, and in each Ministry a Ministerial Procurement Unit (Regulation 79). Under regulation 80 a Public Contracts Review Board is established. The Commercial Sanctions Tribunal (Regulation 95) is appointed to hear and determine issues relating to the black listing of persons unsuitable for the award of a public contract or to act as a sub-contractor to a public sector contractor.

==== Netherlands ====
The main legislative provisions governing public procurement in the Netherlands are:

- the Public Procurement Act 2012 as amended on 1 July 2016;
- the Public Procurement Decree;
- the Works Procurement Regulations 2016;
- the Procurement Regulations for the Utilities Sectors 2013;
- the Proportionality Guide, 2016;
- the Defence and Security Procurement Act 2013.

Sector-specific procurement regulations are also included in the Passenger Transport Act 2000. The Ministry of Economic Affairs is responsible for procurement policy. TenderNed is the Dutch government's online tendering system, which all Dutch contracting authorities are obliged to use to publish their national and European tenders.

==== Portugal ====
Public procurement in Portugal is governed by the Código dos Contratos Públicos or Public Contracts Code (PCC), which has been implemented through the following Decretos-Leis (decree-laws) and other legislation:

- Decree-Law 18/2008 (29 January 2008)
- Decree-Law 59/2008 (11 September 2008)
- Decree-Law 223/2009 (11 September 2009)
- Decree-Law 278/2009 (20 October 2009)
- Decree-Law 3/2010 (27 April 2010)
- Decree-Law 131/2010 (14 December 2010)
- Law 64-B/2011 (30 December 2012)
- Decree-Law 149/2012 (12 July 2012)
- Decree-Law 214-G/2015 (2 October 2015)
- Decree-Law 111-B/2017 (31 August 2017)

Decree-Law No. 104/2011 (6 October 2011) applies to defence contracts.

The Administrative Procedural Code, established under decree-law 4/2015 (7 January 2015) also provides for general procedures on administrative matters and the Procedural Code of the Administrative Courts established by Law no. 15/2002 (22 February 2002), amended by Decree-Law 214-G/2015, stipulates procedures for litigation regarding public contracts and procurement practices.

==== Romania ====
ANAP is the National Agency for Public Procurement in Romania. Public sector tenders in Romania are published on the Sistemul Electronic de Achizitii Publice (SEAP). A public procurement reform strategy was developed jointly by the European Commission and the Romanian Government in 2015.

==== Slovakia ====
Public procurement in Slovakia is subject to the Law on Public Contracts, which came into effect in September 2015. Contract opportunities are advertised in the Slovak Official Journal for Procurement Notices, as well as in the Official Journal of the European Union when above the threshold values, and a public register of final beneficiaries of companies that win public sector contracts is maintained. The Public Procurement Regulatory Authority (Slovak: l’Úrad pre verejné obstarávanie) oversees procurement operations.

==== Slovenia ====
Public procurement in Slovenia is overseen by the Public Procurement Directorate within the Ministry of Public Administration. The Slovenian Public Procurement Act, the ZJN-3, came into force on 1 April 2016, and covers both public sector and utilities procurement, implementing Directives 2014/24/EU and 2014/25/EU in one piece of legislation.

==== Spain ====
Spanish law on public sector contracts (Ley 30/2007 de contratos del sector público, known as the "LCSP") was substantially amended by a new Law 2/2011 on Sustainable Economy ("LES") following an infringement procedure undertaken by the European Commission, which found that the LCSP "gave contracting authorities a wide, almost unlimited, power to modify essential terms of public contracts after award, in a manner which was not in line with the principles of equal treatment between bidders, non-discrimination and transparency set out in EU public procurement rules". The Basque Country government has issued an "instruction" concerned with inclusion of social and environmental criteria in procurement decision-making. The region's government aims to promote the economic, social and environmental sustainability of the Basque Country through its Green Procurement and Contracting Program 2030.

==== Sweden ====
The Swedish Competition Authority is responsible for oversight of government procurement in Sweden, having taken over this role from the Board for Public Procurement (Swedish: Nämnden för offentlig upphandling) when it was dissolved in 2007.

=== Fiji ===
The Fiji Procurement Office was established under Section 4 of the Fiji Procurement Regulations 2010 and commenced operations on 1 August 2010. The establishment of the Office and the new Fiji Procurement Regulations were a direct result of the re-organisation of the Government Supplies Department by the Fijian government. The main functions of the Fiji Procurement Office are to regulate and administer the procurement of goods, service and works for the government. The Government Tender Board is "constituted with authority to approve all procurement of goods, services and works valued at FJ$50,001 and more". Refer www.fpo.gov.fj for more information

=== Ghana ===
Public procurement in Ghana is undertaken and overseen by the Public Procurement Authority of Ghana. The Public Procurement Board is the central body for policy formulation on procurement. The existing Public Procurement Act 2003 (Act 663) was amended by the Public Procurement (Amendment) Act 2016 (Act 914), which came into effect on 1 July 2016. The Minister of State in Charge of Public Procurement is Sarah Adwoa Safo. She has taken a lead role in the fight against corruption in Ghana, identifying corruption as "a high-risk activity in the country".

=== Gibraltar ===
Government procurement in Gibraltar is managed by the Procurement Office, an independent office of Her Majesty's Government of Gibraltar which reports directly to the Financial Secretary. In 2012 the European Commission raised a concern regarding the United Kingdom's incomplete transposition of the Defence and Security Public Contracts Regulations 2011 into law. Gibraltar left the EU on 31 January 2020 at the same time as the UK.

=== Guernsey ===
Public procurement opportunities in Guernsey are advertised on the Channel Islands Procurement Portal, which was launched in April 2008 and is shared with Jersey.

=== Guyana ===
Public procurement in Guyana is overseen by the Public Procurement Commission, appointed under the Public Procurement Commission Act 2003. Due to lengthy delay in identifying and agreeing commission members, the commission was not appointed until 2016. The PPC is based in the Queenstown area of Georgetown. The National Procurement and Tender Administration of Guyana (NPTA), established under section 16(1) of the Procurement Act 2003, undertakes administrative processes for high value governmental tenders.

=== Haiti ===
In 2005, the Haitian government formed the National Commission for Public Procurement (French: La Commission Nationale des Marchés Publics, CNMP), based in Port-au-Prince, whose tasks are to ensure that competitive bidding takes place for public contracts and to promulgate effective procurement controls in government administration. The commission was established by the Decree of 3 December 2004. The CNMP publishes lists of awarded public contracts. According to the website GlobalSecurity.org, "despite the CNMP's efforts, major public procurement contracts, notably those involving the state electric company EDH, are routinely awarded in a non-competitive fashion", providing significant opportunities for corruption.

=== Honduras ===
Government procurement in Honduras is overseen by the National Office of Contracting and Procurement of the State of Honduras (Oficina Normativa de Contratación y Adquisiciones del Estado, ONCAE), based in Tegucigalpa. Honduras has five laws directing public contracting:

- Ley de Contratación del Estado (revised December 2016)
- Ley de Compras Efficientes y Transparentes a través de Medios Electrónicos, Decreto No. 36-2013, 1 July 2014
- Reglamento de la Ley de Compras Efficientes y Transparentes a través de Medios Electrónicos, whose purpose is to "develop" the law in decree 36–2013
- Reglamento Ley de Contratación del Estado (revised December 2015)
- Reforma al Reglamento de la Ley de Contratación del Estado.

=== Iceland ===
Act No. 84/2007 on Public Procurement (2007) has three objectives:

- to ensure the equal treatment of companies during public procurement
- to encourage efficiency in public operations through active competition and
- to promote innovation and development in the public procurement of goods, labour and services. The law applies to "the Icelandic State, local authorities, their institutions and other public entities" and to "associations formed by one or more of such authorities". An independent Public Procurement Complaints Commission has power to investigate complaints and may declare a contract "ineffective" if its award was not compliant with the legislation.

=== India ===
The government procurement-related disciplines in India are governed by various Public Procurement Orders and the General Financial Rule. Public Procurement Orders and the General Financial Rule are primarily taken care of by the Public Procurement Section of Department for Promotion of Industry and Internal Trade (DPIIT), the Ministry of Commerce and Industry and the Department of Expenditure within the Ministry of Finance respectively. In 2017, the Public Procurement Order and General Financial Rule was amended by the government of India to include a Make In India preference. Use of the online Government e Marketplace is mandated for Union public procurement.

Emergency procurement powers are available to the Indian armed forces, enabling them to meet "urgent operational requirements" without complying with standard procurement procedures. Under Indian law, an incumbent contractor who has tendered for an extension contract has a right of first refusal ("ROFR") allowing that contractor to match the lowest bid submitted by a competing company. The case of National Highways Authority of India (NHAI) v Gwalior Jhansi Expressway Ltd. (2018) confirmed that an incumbent contractor who does not submit a tender in accordance with the public body's notice inviting tenders loses the right of first refusal.

=== Indonesia ===
Indonesia has observer status with respect to the Government Procurement Agreement. The UK's Serious Fraud Office and other regulatory bodies undertook an enquiry into bribery payments intended to secure contracts with the government of Indonesia for the supply of tetraethyl lead, leading to the conviction of four company executives in 2014. The convictions also related to offences concerning Iraq.

=== Isle of Man ===
The Isle of Man government spends over £200 million each year on goods, works and services, promoting competition in procurement under the Council of Ministers' Procurement Policy for Government, published in 2017.

=== Israel ===
In Israel, the Mandatory Tenders Law of 12 March 1992, 5752–1992 (as amended), governs government procurement procedures. Oversight of the legislation lies with the Ministry of Finance in conjunction with the Knesset Constitution, Law and Justice Committee. The government may, with the approval of the Knesset Foreign Affairs and Defense Committee, direct that a state or a government corporation may not enter into a contract with a particular foreign country or with a particular foreign supplier for reasons of foreign policy.

=== Jamaica ===
The Government of Jamaica Procurement Guidelines apply to government procurement in Jamaica, and the Public Sector Procurement Policy of November 2010 reflects "the government's ... strategy to further reform the public procurement system that is aligned to international best practices and promote fair competition for government contracts". Until 1996, Jamaica operated a centralised procurement system coordinated by the Central Supply Division of the Ministry of Finance, and procurement activity was regulated by the Financial Administration (Supplies) Regulations 1963 supplemented by directives from the Ministry of Finance. The Ministry of Finance and the Public Service is now responsible for oversight of procurement policy. A Procurement Policy Implementation Unit was established within the Ministry of Finance in September 1999.

The Office of the Contractor-General (OCG), based in Kingston, was established in 1983 under the Contractor General Act of that year. The Contractor General is appointed by the Governor General. In December 2008, three members of the procurement committee of the Jamaica Urban Transit Company resigned following reports of procurement breaches identified by the Contractor-General, Greg Christie. The National Contracts Commission (NCC) was established in October 1999. Members of the NCC are also appointed by the Governor-General.

=== Jersey ===
The States of Jersey's procurement opportunities are advertised on the Channel Islands Procurement Portal, which was launched in April 2008 and is shared with Guernsey.

=== Kenya ===
Public procurement in Kenya is governed by the Public Procurement and Asset Disposal Act 2015.

=== Kosovo ===
The Republic of Kosovo's Public Procurement Regulatory Commission, based in Pristina, is responsible for "the overall development, operation and supervision of the public procurement system in Kosova", subject to regulations imposed by Public Procurement Law of Kosovo No.04/L-042 of 2011. Law No.04/L-042 was approved by the Assembly of Kosovo on 29 August 2011, promulgated by the President of the Republic of Kosovo with decree No.DL-032-2011 on 31 August 2011, and published in the official Gazette of the Republic of Kosovo No.18 on 18 September 2011. The amended Public Procurement Law (2017) gives preference to local bidders when the quality and price are comparable to that of foreign bidders. Kosovo is not a WTO member and is therefore not a signatory to the Government Procurement Agreement. The Kosovo Specialist Chambers and Specialist Prosecutor's Office issues public calls for tender on its own website.

=== Kyrgyz Republic ===
Public sector procurement in the Kyrgyz Republic is regulated by the Law "On Public Procurements" dated 3 April 2015, No. 72; the republic refers to the principles of publicity, openness, legality, and impartiality as critical in relation to suppliers (contractors).

=== Laos ===
Public procurement in the Lao People's Democratic Republic is governed by the Prime Minister's Decree on Procurement of Goods, Works, Maintenance and Services No. 03/PM, dated 9 January 2004, and the Implementing Rules and Regulations on Government Procurement of Goods, Works, Maintenance and Services No. 063/PM, dated 12 March 2004. Amendments were made to some of the articles of the Implementing Rules and the Decree by Update 0861/MOF of 5 May 2009. Procurement activities are overseen by the Procurement Monitoring Office (PrMO) within the Ministry of Finance.

=== Liberia ===
Government procurement in Liberia is governed by the Public Procurement Act. The Public Procurement and Concessions Commission (PPCC) was established in 2005 to "regulate all forms of Public Procurement and Concessions and provide for institutional structures for public procurement and concessions". The PPCC operates an online Vendors' Register. Procurement is decentralised, but the Ministry of Finance is required "to take part in the negotiations and signing of contracts over US$250,000" and such contracts must "be attested to by the Ministry of Justice".

=== Liechtenstein ===
Liechtenstein is a member of the European Economic Area (EEA) and subject to Annex XVI (Procurement) to the EEA Agreement. The Annex provides that its references to ILO Conventions do not apply to Liechtenstein, but equivalent standards on labour conditions are to be applied.

=== Malaysia ===
Malaysia's ePerolehan system provides access to public procurement opportunities. Malaysia has observer status with respect to the Government Procurement Agreement.

=== Maldives ===
Government procurement in the Maldives is subject to the Public Finance Law (Law No. 3/2006) and chapter 10 of the Public Finance Regulation. The approval of the National Tender Board is required before contracts in excess of MVR 2.5m can be awarded.

=== Mali ===
Public procurement in Mali is overseen by the Autorité de Régulation des Marchés Publics et des Délégations de Service Public, based in Bamako.

=== Mauritius ===
Public bodies in the Republic of Mauritius use the country's Public Procurement Portal to post information relating to their public procurement activities. Public Procurement Regulations date from 2008, with a number of additional regulations subsequently adopted.

=== Mexico ===
Public procurement is included in Article 134 of the Mexican Constitution. Article 134 is implemented by the Law of Public Sector Acquisitions, Leasing and Services ("Acquisition Law") and the Law of Public Works and Related Services ("Public Work Law"). At a local level, each of the 31 states and the Federal District has different public procurement laws.

=== Moldova ===
The Republic of Moldova ratified the Government Procurement Agreement on 14 June 2016.

=== Montenegro ===
Montenegro joined the Agreement on Government Procurement in 2015 after approval was granted on 29 October 2014. Exclusions apply in respect of

- procurement of agricultural products for agricultural support programmes and human food aid programmes
- procurement of broadcasting material by broadcasters, and contracts for broadcasting time, and
- some aspects of procurement connected with the provision of drinking water, energy, transport and the postal sector.

=== Morocco ===
Morocco's National Commission for Public Procurement (CNCP) was established "to oversee public procurement, control public spending and guarantee the principles of transparency and parity in the development and execution of contracts between competitors", with a role also in handling complaints regarding procurement actions.

=== Mozambique ===
Decree no. 5/2016, Public Procurement Regulations governs public procurement in Mozambique.

=== Namibia ===
Namibia's Procurement Management Unit is based within the Ministry of Finance & Public Enterprises, located in Windhoek. Bid opportunities are listed online by the unit.

=== New Zealand ===
The New Zealand Government Procurement Branch of the Ministry of Business, Innovation and Employment is responsible for the Government Procurement Rules, Government Rules of Sourcing and Principles of Government Procurement. The aim of the Government Rules of Sourcing is to "support good practice for procurement planning, approaching the supplier community and contracting". The 66 rules were initially introduced in 2013. The principles apply to all governmental procurement activity but the rules only apply to projects or purchases exceeding $100,000 or construction projects valued over $10 million.

Purchasers of certain common goods or services are required to use "All-of-Government contracts" (AoG) established by the Government Procurement Branch, overseen by the Procurement Functional Leader and managed by appointed procurement Centres of Expertise. Where a public agency wishes to opt out of the use of an AoG contract it must obtain the approval of approval the Procurement Functional Leader: if the agency and the Procurement Functional Leader fail to agree on an opt-out, the State Services Commissioner will decide.

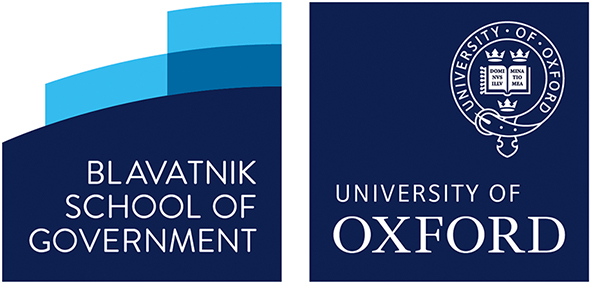
Blavatnik School of Government

New Zealand joined the Agreement on Government Procurement in 2015 after approval was granted on 29 October 2014. The second International Civil Service Effectiveness Index, published in April 2019 by the Blavatnik School of Government at the University of Oxford, ranked New Zealand as the top country for Government Procurement Effectiveness. The procurement indicator was a new addition to this index, not present in the previous 2017 index. The indicator covered both procurement systems and procurement practices. The report authors identified that New Zealand's excellence lay in "the extent of e-procurement functions within its overall procurement system; the role of its central purchasing body; and the extent to which policies are in place to enable small and medium-sized enterprises (SME) to take part in central government procurement".

=== Nigeria ===
Nigeria is a federal republic comprising 36 states and the Federal Capital Territory. The Public Procurement Act 2007 applies. This legislation created the National Council on Public Procurement.

See Rivers State Bureau on Public Procurement for an example of a regulatory body in one of the states.

=== North Macedonia ===
North Macedonia has ratified the Government Procurement Agreement and acceded to membership on 30 October 2023.

=== Pakistan ===
Government procurement in Pakistan is overseen by the Public Procurement Regulatory Authority (PPRA), an autonomous body based in Islamabad which was established by the Public Procurement Regulatory Authority Ordinance of May 2002. The PPRA is responsible for issuing regulations and procedures for public procurement undertaken by federal level public sector organisations. Its brief is to improve the governance, management, transparency, accountability and quality of Pakistan's public procurement. The PPRA also monitors other public sector agencies' procurement activity. The PPRA Board consists of six ministerial appointments from central government departments, three private members and the Authority's managing director. Pakistan has observer status with respect to the Government Procurement Agreement.

=== Panama ===
According to the Office of the United States Trade Representative, "a broad range of Panamanian government entities in all three branches of Panama central government – executive, legislative, and judicial" are obliged to follow public procurement rules, as are the country's regional government agencies, the Panama Canal Authority, and other public enterprises. A chapter in the U.S.-Panama Trade Promotion Agreement covers the right of united States suppliers to enjoy non-discriminatory treatment in bidding for contracts with these entities. Panama has observer status with respect to the Government Procurement Agreement.

=== Peru ===
Peruvian public procurement law is set out in the Public Procurement General Act (Law N° 32069) of 2024. Previous legislation included the Government Procurement Act (approved by Law No. 30225 ), Government Procurement Act (approved by Legislative Decree No. 1017) and the Regulation of the Government Procurement Act (approved by Supreme Decree No. 184-2008-EF). Peruvian President Pedro Pablo Kuczynski resigned on 21 March 2018 following allegations that public works contracts had been corruptly awarded to Brazilian conglomerate Odebrecht.

=== Philippines ===
Public sector procurement in the Philippines is required to follow the Government Procurement Reform Act of 2003. The Philippine government requested observer status with respect to the Government Procurement Agreement on 6 May 2019 and its request was accepted by the WTO Committee on Government Procurement on 26 June 2019, the Philippines confirming that "its government was ... taking steps to create a transparent, open and fair procurement system, founded on a sound legal framework, which includes initiatives to open procurement to foreign suppliers".

=== Russia ===
Russian Federal Law N44-ФЗ of 5 April 2013 requires all federal, regional and municipal government customers to publish all information about government tenders, auctions and other purchase procedures on special public government websites.

=== Rwanda ===
In Rwanda, the public procurement process is managed on a daily basis by an autonomous organ, the Rwanda Public Procurement Authority (RPPA), which operates under the Ministry of Finance and Economic Planning (MINECOFIN). Public procurement is regulated by the Law N°12/2007 of 27 March 2007 on public procurement which was modified and complemented by the Law N°05/2013 of 13 February 2013. The law is implemented by a Ministerial Order N°001/14/10/TC of 19 February 2014 establishing Regulations on Public Procurement, Standard Bidding Documents and Standard Contracts.

Rwanda has a decentralized public procurement system whereby procuring entities (central government organs, local government entities, government projects, commissions, public institutions, parastatals, agencies or any other government entity charged by the Chief Budget Manager to manage public funds) have the power to conduct directly their public procurement process. The main mission of RPPA is (1) to process the establishment and improvement of public procurement legal framework, (2) provide public procurement legal advisory services, (3) conduct audit and monitoring of public procurement activities carried out by procuring entities (tender award and contract management) and (4) build the capacity of public officials involved in public procurement activities.

The public procurement system in Rwanda is governed by 6 fundamental principles namely (1) transparency, (2) competition,(3) economy, (4) efficiency, (5) fairness and (6) accountability. In the national system, bidders have the right to appeal against public procurement procedures they may think were not conducted appropriately. In that connection, the legal framework provides for the Independent Review Panels at National Level (National Independent Review Panel) and at District Level (Independent Review Panel at District Level). The Independent Review Panels are composed of members from the Private Sector, Civil Society and the Public Sector, and the members from the Public Sector cannot form the majority of members of the Panel. The Independent Review Panel at National Level is under the supervision of the Minister of Finance and Economic Planning whereas the Independent Review Panel at District Level is under the supervision of the District Council. Rwanda introduced an e-procurement system in 2016. In order to make the procurement sector a profession in Rwanda, there is an Association of Procurement Professionals, which was established by the Law N°011/2016 of 2 May 2016.

=== Saudi Arabia ===
The Government Expenditure and Projects Efficiency Authority (EXPRO) leads on category management and the use of framework agreements in the Kingdom of Saudi Arabia. Charlie Hart, in a 2021 Supply Management article, gives an account of how EXPRO has reshaped public sector demand and sourcing in the period since 2018, overseeing $100bn of public sector expenditure and supporting 500 Saudi Arabian public bodies and over 12,000 procurement professionals.

EXPRO was awarded ISO certification in quality management, risk management, knowledge management, and collaborative relationship management in 2024.

Saudi Arabia has observer status with respect to the Government Procurement Agreement.

=== Serbia ===
The Serbian law on public procurement came into effect on 1 April 2013, replacing the previous legislation enacted in 2008. A particular concern for Serbia's legislators was dealing with corruption in government procurement: the Law requires Serbia's Public Procurement Office, which oversees procurement, to draft a plan for combating corruption in public procurement procedures, and contracting authorities with an estimated annual value of public procurement in excess of one billion dinars (8.9m Euros) to adopt an internal plan for preventing corruption. The Public Procurement Office is based in Belgrade. The role of the Republic Commission for the Protection of Rights in Public Procurement Procedures, established in 2002, is to protect the rights of bidders during procurement exercises.

The Regulation on Mandatory Elements of Tender Documents in Public Procurement Procedures and Way to Prove Fulfilment of Requirements prescribes a model contract as a mandatory element of every set of tender documents, except when a negotiated procedure is being conducted or where a loan is being procured as a financial service. In 2016, the EU funded a programme of support for "further improvement of Public Procurement system in Serbia", as part of the EU's pre-accession assistance programme. There is no current target date for Serbia to join the EU.

=== Singapore ===
Singapore's Ministry of Finance is responsible for the Government Procurement policy framework, which regulates how government agencies undertake procurement. Singapore's whole-of-government (WOG) procurement function represents an ambition to draw together all Government procurement policies, practices, systems and workforce development under the oversight of the Government Procurement Function Office. In 2014, the Public Accounts Committee of the Parliament of Singapore criticised the state of government procurement in Singapore, identifying a number of irregularities in procurement procedures including:

- weak rationales invoked when waiving competitive processes;
- allowing some bidders to amend their tenders after tenders had closed;
- not disclosing evaluation criteria to bidders within tender documentation;
- improper procedures for tender evaluation;
- lax oversight and monitoring of outsourced projects.

GeBIZ is a Government-to-business (G2B) Public eProcurement business centre where suppliers can conduct electronic commerce with the Singaporean Government. All of the public sector's invitations for quotations and tenders (except for security-sensitive contracts) are posted on GeBIZ. Suppliers can search for government procurement opportunities, retrieve relevant procurement documentations and submit their bids online.

=== South Africa ===
Section 217 of the Constitution of the Republic of South Africa, 1996 (Act 108 of 1996) provides the basis for government procurement:

(1) When an organ of state in the national, provincial or local sphere of Government, or any other institution identified in national legislation, contracts for goods or services, it must do so in accordance with a system which is fair, equitable, transparent, competitive and cost effective.
(2) Subsection (1) does not prevent the organs of state or institutions referred to in that subsection from implementing a procurement policy providing for –

(a) categories of preference in the allocation of contracts; and
(b) the protection or advancement of persons, or categories of persons, disadvantaged by unfair discrimination.

(3) National legislation must prescribe a framework within which the policy referred to in subsection (2) must be implemented.

In Subsection (3), the previous words "may be implemented" were amended to "must be implemented" by section 6 of the Constitution's Seventh Amendment Act of 2001. The Public Finance Management Act of 1999 (PFMA) also refers to the duty of the Accounting Officer of a department to have and to maintain an appropriate procurement and supply system which is "fair, equitable, transparent, competitive and cost effective".

To help prevent corruption, a Central Tender Board was established in 2014.

=== South Korea ===
As of 2010, over 90% of all government procurement in South Korea was undertaking using the country's centrally administered Korea ON-line E-Procurement System (KONEPS), which had been established in 2002. The OECD describes KONEPS as "an integrated e-procurement system which contributes substantially to the efficiency, effectiveness and integrity of public procurement in Korea".

South Korean Ministry of National Defense contracting was highlighted in a California Supreme Court case in 2003, Korea Supply Company v Lockhead Martin, when Korea Supply accused Lockhead of unfair commercial practices including bribing Korean officials.

=== Suriname ===
Government procurement in Suriname takes place on the basis of open tenders. Participants in a tendering procedure must hold a valid business license and must be registered with the Suriname Chamber of Commerce and Industry (KKF). Suriname is not a signatory to the WTO Government Procurement Agreement.

=== Tajikistan ===
Tajikistan is not a signatory to the WTO Government Procurement Agreement, but the US Department of State has noted that the country has made a commitment to initiate accession to the agreement as part of its WTO accession protocol.

=== Tanzania ===
Public procurement in the United Republic of Tanzania is overseen by the country's Public Procurement Regulatory Authority (PPRA), which was established under the terms of the Public Procurement Act in 2004. The objectives of the PPRA are:

to ensure the application of fair, competitive, transparent, non-discriminatory and value for money procurement standards and practices; set standards for the public procurement systems in United Republic of Tanzania; monitor compliance of procuring entities; and build, in collaboration with Public Procurement Policy Division and other relevant professional bodies, procurement capacity in the United Republic.

The Public Procurement Act 2004 has been superseded by the Public Procurement Act 2011.

=== Turkey ===
Turkey's Law No. 5812 of 2008 governs public procurement. This law brought procurement provisions into line with European Union practices, although a European Economic and Social Committee opinion noted in 2011 that there was "room for improvement" in regard to appeal procedures. Turkey has observer status with respect to the Government Procurement Agreement.

=== Ukraine ===
The Ministry of Economic Development and Trade (Ukraine) is an executive authority in charge of coordination of procurement of goods, works and services for public funds. The Law "On public procurement" is one of the core legislative bases of the procurement regulations. It made electronic public procurement procedures and use of e-procurement system Prozorro mandatory for all procuring entities after August 2016. Ukraine joined the Government Procurement Agreement in March 2016.

=== United Arab Emirates ===
Federal government procurement within the United Arab Emirates is governed by Cabinet Resolution No. 32 of 2014 on Federal Government Procurement Regulation and Storehouse Management in Federal Government, which applies to all supply, works and services purchasing undertaken by the federal government and the federal ministries and governmental agencies (except the Ministry of Defence), and also to independent federal entities such as the General Authority for Civil Aviation, Emirates Real Estate Corporation, FEWA, ESCA, Insurance Authority, Emirates Post Group Holding, National Transport Authority, Telecommunications Regulatory Authority, UAE University and Zayed University. UAE Federal Decree No. 12 of the Deputy Supreme Commander of the Armed Forces (1986) applies to armed forces procurement. Conditional preferential treatment is afforded under Resolution 32 to corporate suppliers whose capital does not exceed AED 10 million and in which the UAE national shareholding is not less than 51%, and to facilities which are financed by SME-supporting funds and governed by federal or local law.

=== United Kingdom ===
At around £290 billion every year, public sector procurement accounts for around a third of all public expenditure in the UK. On 24 February 2025, the Procurement Act 2023 took effect. Previously, EU-based laws such as the Public Contracts Regulations 2015, Part 3 of the Small Business, Enterprise and Employment Act 2015, and (in Scotland) the Public Contracts (Scotland) Regulations of 2015 and 2016 continued to apply to government procurement.

=== United Nations ===
In 2021, the 41 United Nations organizations between them spent US$29.6 billion on purchasing goods and services. The UN's Office for Project Services supports UN procurement and publishes an annual analysis of the combined UN expenditure and key trends in UN procurement.

=== United States ===
Government procurement and government contracting by public authorities in the United States accounts for about US$7 trillion annually; the central purchasing agency is the General Services Administration (GSA). Federal procurement is governed by the Federal Acquisition Regulation which is intended by Congress to ensure that taxpayer money is used wisely, in ways that benefit the public or nation as a whole.

FedBizOpps operated until 2019 as a source of information on government contracts. This is now SAM.gov. Public announcements of awards allow for several exemptions, including contracts less than $3.5 million. Historically, the procurement data has been criticized for deficiencies leading to a number of reforms. In 2013, eight legacy databases were merged into a single system called "System for Award Management" (SAM), where companies interested in doing business with the federal government may register their interest.

Contracts are not posted online, although two agencies have explored the possibility. In January 2014, the Office of Inspector General at NASA released a report criticizing the agency's lack of strategic sourcing. Because IT departments were spending autonomously, NASA spent $25.7 million on similar purchases. The National Institute of Governmental Purchasing and the Federal Acquisition Institute are active in procurement certification and training. A specialized program in procurement law in the United States is located at The George Washington University Law School.

=== Uruguay ===
Uruguay became the 39th observer to the Government Procurement Agreement on 24 June 2026.

=== Vatican City ===
Purchasing is overseen by the Secretariat for the Economy, which is responsible for setting purchasing policies and procedures, while responsibility for expenditure is devolved to individual dicasteries and administrations. Rules on "transparency, control and competition in the procedures for awarding public contracts of the Holy See and Vatican City State" were published on 19 May 2020 and amended on 16 January 2024.

=== Vietnam ===
A directive was issued in Vietnam in April 2010 concerning the use of domestic products and materials and on public contracts for these products, where they are financed with state funds.

=== World Bank Group ===
The World Bank functions like a cooperative owned by its 189 member countries. Its own procurement activities are handled at a corporate level, and its Procurement Framework, approved in July 2015 and operational since July 2016, applies to projects and programmes which are supported with World Bank funds. The Procurement Framework has four key principles:

- Needs and risks of a project are analyzed through a Project Procurement Strategy for Development (PPSD). This analysis enables the borrower to have a strategy on how best to engage with bidders. The analysis ensures that procurement processes are fit for purpose, allow choice, and are appropriate to the size, value, and risk of the project.
- Value for Money is a core procurement principle in all procurements financed by the World Bank. This means the focus is on bids that provide the best overall value for money, taking into account quality, cost, and other factors as needed, rather than a focus on the lowest evaluated compliant bid.
- The approach to resolving procurement-related complaints has the capacity to promptly respond to any concerns during the procurement process. There is a standstill period -a pause between identifying who should win the contract and actually awarding them the contract- so that other bidders can voice any concerns before a contract is actually legally formed and awarded.
- The World Bank is more involved in contract management of procurements with high value and high risk to ensure the best possible outcomes and that problems are resolved quickly.

=== Zambia ===
Public procurement in Zambia is governed by the Public Procurement Act No. 12 of 2008 and the Public Procurement Regulations of 2011. Prior to 2008, public procurement was governed by the Zambia National Tender Board Act, Act No. 30 of 1982. The CEO of the Zambia National Tender Board is appointed by the President.

== See also ==
- Agreement on Government Procurement
- Business-to-government
- Forward Commitment Procurement
- Government spending
- Open Contracting Data Standard
- Output-based aid
- Public–private partnership
- Performance-based contracting

== Bibliography ==
- Raccolta degli ordini e de' regolamenti delle strade della Lombardia austriaca. Milan: Giuseppe Galeazzi. 1785. p. 54.
