= Framework agreement =

Agreement that recognizes it is not final

In the context of negotiations, a framework agreement is an agreement between two parties that recognizes that the parties have not come to a final agreement on all matters relevant to the relationship between them, but have come to agreement on enough matters to move forward with the relationship, with further details to be agreed to in the future.

In the context of procurement, a framework agreement is an agreement between one or more businesses or organisations, "the purpose of which is to establish the terms governing contracts to be awarded during a given period, in particular with regard to price and, where appropriate, the quantity envisaged".

== International framework agreements ==
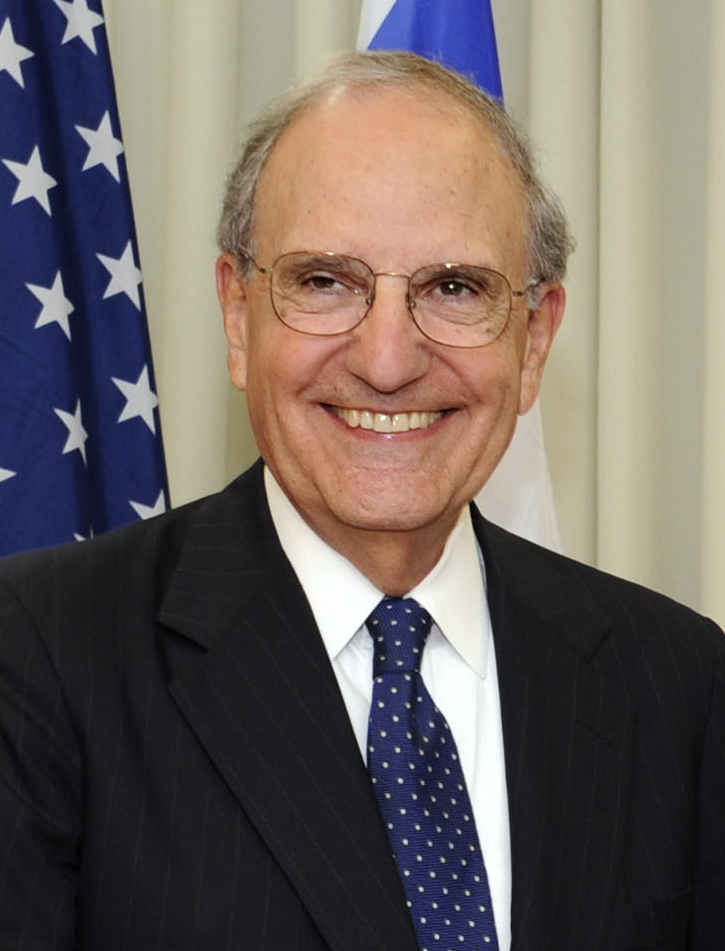
Senator George Mitchell in Tel Aviv, 26 July 2009

In international law, such an agreement between countries or groups can acknowledge that they cannot reach full agreement on all issues, but are willing to memorialize a structure by which some disagreements can be resolved.

In describing the effort to reach an agreement between Israel and Palestine, Senator George J. Mitchell explained:

A framework agreement is not an interim agreement. It's more detailed than a declaration of principles, but is less than a full-fledged treaty. Its purpose is to establish the fundamental compromises necessary to enable the parties to then flesh out and complete a comprehensive agreement that will end the conflict and establish a lasting peace.

Entering into a framework agreement can shift the lawmaking power from the states to a plenary body, and can shift the basis for forming consent to new norms and standards reached through their negotiations. The practice of entering into framework agreements originated in the 1950s with an agreement regarding asylum between Colombia and Peru.

A number of international accords are characterized as framework agreements:

- Agreed Framework, between North Korea and the United States
- Baker Plan, a United Nations initiative to grant self-determination to Western Sahara
- Banana Framework Agreement, between the European Union and banana-producing countries
- Bay of Bengal Initiative for Multi-Sectoral Technical and Economic Cooperation#BIMSTEC Free Trade Area Framework Agreement, involving the Bay of Bengal
- Economic Cooperation Framework Agreement, between mainland China and Taiwan
- General Framework Agreement for Peace in Bosnia and Herzegovina or Dayton Agreement
- Iran nuclear deal framework
- Strategic Framework Agreement (SFA), between the United States and Iraq (2008)
- Trade and Investment Framework Agreement, an international trade pact

== Domestic framework agreements ==
Non-international framework agreements include:

- Framework Agreement on the Bangsamoro, a preliminary peace agreement between the Moro Islamic Liberation Front and the government of the Philippines calling for the creation of an autonomous area, Bangsamoro
- Social Union Framework Agreement, in Canada

== Procurement ==
Businesses, especially public contracting authorities, may enter into framework agreements with one or more suppliers, which prescribe the terms and conditions which would apply to any subsequent contract and make provision for selection and appointment of a contractor by reference directly to the agreed terms and conditions or by holding a competition inviting only the partners to the framework agreement to submit specific commercial proposals.

In the public sector, a number of Central Purchasing Bodies exist whose purposes include the creation and management of framework agreements which are compliant with EU Procurement Directives and available for use by designated public bodies. In the United Kingdom, examples include Crown Commercial Service, local authority consortia such as the Eastern Shires Purchasing Organisation (ESPO) and Yorkshire Purchasing Organisation (YPO), and consortia operating in the higher and further education sectors: APUC (in Scotland), Crescent Purchasing Consortium (CPC), London Universities Purchasing Consortium (LUPC), North Eastern Universities Purchasing Consortium (NEUPC), North Western Universities Purchasing Consortium (NWUPC), and Southern Universities Purchasing Consortium (SUPC). For a more complete list, see List of central purchasing bodies in the United Kingdom

The Chartered Institute of Procurement & Supply makes a distinction between a "framework contract" and a "framework agreement". Under a framework contract, some form of consideration is paid "up front" to secure the commitment of the supplier to the agreed terms and conditions. The value of the consideration may be for a nominal amount only. A framework agreement, or an "umbrella agreement", lacks consideration and therefore lacks obligation: a "pricing formula" may apply for a period of time (e.g. a price list) or prices and further details may be determined via a "mini-competition".
