= PPRA =

PPRA may refer to:

- Protection of Pupil Rights Amendment in the United States
- The Public Procurement Regulatory Authority in Pakistan
