= Agreement on Government Procurement =

World Trade Organization agreement

- Parties to the Marrakesh Agreement, as amended: Parties Observers negotiating accession Observers only
- Signed: 12 April 1979 (Geneva); 2 February 1987 (amendment); 15 April 1994 (Marrakesh); 30 March 2012 (amendment)
- Location: Geneva (1979), Marrakesh (1996)
- Effective: 1 January 1981 (Geneva); 14 February 1988 (amendment); 1 January 1996 (Marrakesh); 6 April 2014 (amendment)
- Parties: 12 (Geneva, as amended); 21 (Marrakesh, as amended)
- Depositary: Director-General of the World Trade Organization
- Languages: English, French and Spanish

The Agreement on Government Procurement (GPA) is a plurilateral agreement under the auspices of the World Trade Organization (WTO) which regulates the procurement of goods and services by the public authorities of the parties to the agreement, based on the principles of openness, transparency and non-discrimination.

The agreement was originally established in 1979 as the "Tokyo Round Government Procurement Code", which entered into force in 1981 under the auspices of the General Agreement on Tariffs and Trade. It was then renegotiated in parallel with the Uruguay Round in 1994, and this version entered into force on 1 January 1996.

The text adopted in 1996 anticipated that there would be subsequent improvements. An understanding on the expected revisions was reached in December 2006, and the agreement was subsequently revised on 30 March 2012. The revised GPA came into effect on 6 July 2014 and has applied since 1 January 2021 to all members.

== Parties ==
The following WTO Members are parties to the amended 1994 agreement:

Parties	Accession date
Canada	1 January 1996
The European Union with respect to (Note: The agreement applied to the UK as part of its EU membership from 1 January 1996 until 31 December 2020 at the end of the transition period) Austria, Belgium, Denmark, Finland, France, Germany, Greece, Ireland, Italy, Luxembourg, the Netherlands, Portugal, Spain and Sweden	1 January 1996
Israel	1 January 1996
Japan	1 January 1996
Norway	1 January 1996
Switzerland	1 January 1996
United States	1 January 1996
The Netherlands with respect to Aruba	25 October 1996
South Korea	1 January 1997
Hong Kong SAR	19 June 1997
Liechtenstein	18 September 1997
Singapore	20 October 1997
Iceland	28 April 2001
The European Union with respect to Cyprus, the Czech Republic, Estonia, Hungary, Latvia, Lithuania, Malta, Poland, the Slovak Republic and Slovenia	1 May 2004
The European Union with respect to Bulgaria and Romania	1 January 2007
Chinese Taipei (Note: Taiwan acceded to the WTO as the "Separate Customs Territory of Taiwan, Penghu, Kinmen and Matsu", shortened as "Chinese Taipei")	15 July 2009
Armenia	15 September 2011
The European Union with respect to Croatia	1 July 2013
Montenegro	15 July 2015
New Zealand	12 August 2015
Ukraine	18 May 2016
Moldova	14 June 2016
Australia	5 May 2019
United Kingdom	1 January 2021
North Macedonia	30 October 2023

=== Observer status ===
The following WTO Members have obtained observer status with respect to the GPA, with those marked with an asterisk (*) negotiating accession: Afghanistan, Albania*, Argentina, Bahrain, Belarus, Brazil*, Cameroon, Chile, China*, Colombia, Costa Rica*, Côte d'Ivoire, Ecuador, Georgia*, India, Indonesia, Jordan*, Kazakhstan*, Kyrgyz Republic*, Malaysia, Mongolia, Oman*, Pakistan, Panama, Paraguay, Philippines, Russia*, Saudi Arabia, Seychelles, Sri Lanka, Tajikistan*, Thailand, Turkey and Vietnam.

=== Committee on Government Procurement ===
Representatives from each WTO member which is a party to the Agreement serve on the Committee on Government Procurement, whose role is to oversee the agreement's implementation. WTO Members with observer status may attend committee meetings as an observer if they provide written notice of their participation. As of March 2025, Martin Zbinden of Switzerland is the chair of the committee.

== Main principles ==
The WTO states that the two "cornerstone" principles underlying the agreement are non-discrimination (in regard to the treatment of the goods and services from, and suppliers of, any other party to the agreement) and transparency.

== Coverage ==
Procuring entities bound by the Agreement vary by member state. Each member state has its own Appendix 1 which forms an integral part of the Agreement detailing how the agreement applies to their national procurement activities. Each Appendix 1 has seven annexes:

- Annex 1: central government entities covered by the Agreement
- Annex 2: sub-central government entities covered by the Agreement
- Annex 3: other entities covered by the Agreement
- Annex 4: scope: goods
- Annex 5: scope: services
- Annex 6: scope: construction services
- Annex 7: general notes.

== Review Body on Bid Challenges ==
The Review Body on Bid Challenges is a body set up in 1998 by party states in order to allow suppliers to challenge irregular government tenders. The Review Body is independent and endeavors to process each case in an expeditious manner. The Review Body is also empowered to recommend Rapid Interim Measures (RIMs), which can be recommended within days where a Review Body finds a prima facie case for a bid challenge.

== UK membership after Brexit ==
The UK applied the agreement as part of its EU membership from 1 January 1996. After the UK left the EU on 1 February 2020, the agreement remained in force during the transition period until 1 January 2021. Discussions about continued UK membership were initiated on 27 June 2018, and in October 2020, the UK was invited to become a party in its own right at the end of the transition phase.
