= Rivers State Bureau on Public Procurement =

Rivers State Bureau on Public Procurement (RSBOPP)
- Company type: Government agency
- Founded: 2008 (18 years ago)
- Founder: Government of Rivers State
- Headquarters: Water Line House, 169 Aba Road, Port Harcourt, Nigeria
- Area served: Rivers State, Nigeria
- Key people: Engr. Dr. Ine E. Briggs (Acting Director-General)
- Website: www.rsbopp.rv.gov.ng

The Rivers State Bureau on Public Procurement (RSBOPP) is a regulatory agency within the Government of Rivers State in Nigeria, which regulates, monitors and oversees public procurement, ensuring that its conduct in the state follows laid down rules, is accountable, transparent and delivers value for money. It was created by the Rivers State Public Procurement Law no. 4 of 2008.

== Board of directors ==
The agency is led by a board of directors that comprises a Chairperson, the Attorney General of Rivers State, seven other members, and the Director-General of the bureau. The first board of directors of RSBOPP was inaugurated on 9 September 2008 by the Governor of Rivers State.

== Duties and powers ==
Fundamental duties and powers of the agency are as follows:

1. enforce the monetary and prior review thresholds for the application of the provisions of the law;
2. inspect or review all procurement transactions to ensure compliance;
3. determine whether a procuring entity has violated the provisions of the law;
4. de-list any suppliers, contractor, or services provider that contravenes this law or regulations made under this law;
5. maintain a list of firms and persons that have been de-listed and publish same in the procurement journal;
6. provide guidelines for the classification, and registration of contractors and service providers by the procuring entities and maintain a database of state contractors and services providers which may be reviewed periodically;
7. carry out procurement audits;
8. cancel any part or an entire procurement process were a breach is observed;
9. act on procurement complaints;
10. suspend any officer who has been proved to be responsible for a breach of the law;
11. replace the head or any member of a procuring unit of a procuring entity, as well as chairperson of the Tender Board; and
12. discipline the accounting officer of procuring entity.
