= Government Procurement Reform Act =

Philippine law

Congress of the Philippines
- Long title: An Act Providing for the Modernization, Standardization and Regulation of the Procurement Activities of the Government and for other Purposes
- Citation: Government Procurement Reform Act
- Territorial extent: Philippines
- Enacted by: 12th Congress of the Philippines
- Enacted: December 18, 2002
- Signed by: Gloria Macapagal Arroyo
- Signed: January 10, 2003
- Effective: January 26, 2003

Legislative history
- Bill citation: House Bill No. 4809
- Introduced by: Jose de Venecia Jr.
- Second reading: October 22, 2002
- Third reading: October 23, 2002
- Committee report: Committee Report No. 00479
- Bill citation: Senate Bill No. 2248
- Conference committee bill passed by 12th Congress of the Philippines: May 21, 2002

Repeals
- EO No. 40 s. 2001, EO. No. 262 s. 2000, EO. No. 302 s. 1996, PD No. 1594 s. 1978

Related legislation
- Revised implementing rules and regulations
- Status: In force

The New Government Procurement Act of 2024, officially designated as Republic Act No. 12009, is a Philippine law which prescribes the necessary rules to address the lack of transparency and competition in government procurement, eliminate collusion and interference, and lessen the delay in the procurement process by creating the Government Procurement Policy Board (GPPB) and PhilGEPs. It updates the Government Procurement Reform Act of 2003, officially designated as Republic Act No. 9184.

The act covers the Philippine government's procurement of infrastructure projects, goods and consulting services from both local and foreign suppliers.

== Overview ==
=== Creation of the Government Procurement Policy Board ===
The law created the Government Procurement Policy Board (GPPB), which is responsible for protecting the nation's interest regarding public procurement, formulating and amending the Implementing Rules and Regulations (IRR) and the corresponding standard forms for procurement, ensuring that regular conduct of procurement training programs, and performing an annual review on the law and to recommend any amendments, if necessary. The GPPB also absorbs all the powers, functions and the responsibilities of the Procurement Policy Board created by Executive Order No. 359 s. 1989. Furthermore, all of the affected function of the Infrastructure Committee of the National Economic and Development Authority are transferred to the GPPB.

=== Philippine Government Electronic Procurement System (PhilGEPs) ===
Philippine Government Electronic Procurement System (PhilGEPs), initially created by E.O. 322, s.2000 and E.O. 40, s.2001, will continue to be managed by the Department of Budget and Management but will fall under the supervision of the GPPB. This online portal serves as the primary source of information on government procurement to ensure transparency and efficiency on the government's procurement process. It features a centralized electronic bulletin board for posting procurement opportunities, notices awards and reasons for awards. It also serves as a registry of all manufacturers, suppliers, distributors, contractors and consultants who transact with the government.

== Legislative history ==
=== House Bill No. 4809 ===
On May 16, 2002, Pangasinan Rep. Jose C. De Venecia, Jr. filed House Bill No. 4809 to the Committee on Appropriations and was subsequently approved and recommended to the Committee on Rules on May 21, 2002. HB 4809 replaced HB187, HB333 and HB2986. The second reading of the bill took place on May 27, 2002 and was sponsored by Camarines Sur Representatives Rolando G. Andaya and Felix William B. Fuentebella. The second reading of the bill was approved on October 22, 2002. The third reading was approved the following day, October 23 and passed the House of Representatives with a unanimous vote.

=== Senate Bill No. 2248 ===
The senate received the bill on November 6, 2002, and requested to form a conference committee on November 12. The bill was approved and sent to the President's Office on December 20, 2002.

=== Signature ===
In July 2024, President Marcos Jr. signed Senate Bill No. 2593 into law.

== Content ==
=== Processes ===
The new law optimises the procurement process to 60 days and provides for 11 new modalities of procurement, including the most economically advantageous responsive bid concept.

=== Penalties ===
==== Public Officials ====
According to Art. XXI Sec. 65 (a) of RA 9184, public officers who commit any of the following acts shall suffer the penalty of imprisonment of not less than six (6) years and one (1) day, but not more than fifteen (15) years:

1. Opening a sealed bid, including but not limited to bids which have been submitted through the electronic system and any and all documents required to be sealed or divulging their contents, prior to the appointed time for the public opening of bids.
2. Delaying without justifiable cause, the screening for eligibility, opening of bids, evaluation and post evaluation of bids and awarding of contracts beyond the prescribed periods of action provided for in the Implementing Rules and Regulations (IRR).
3. Unduly influencing or exerting undue pressure on any member of the Bids and Awards Committee (BAC) or any officer of employee of the procuring entity to take a particular action which favors, or tends to favor a particular bidder.
4. Splitting of contracts which exceed procedural purchase limits and competitive bidding.
5. When the head of the agency abuses the exercise of his power to reject any and all as mentioned in Section 41 of the Act (Reservation Clause) with manifest preference to any bidder who is closely related to him in accordance with Section 47 of the Act (Disclosure of Relations).

==== Private Individuals ====
According to Art. XXI Section 65 (b) of RA 9184, private individuals who commit any of the following acts, including any public officer, who conspires with them, shall suffer the penalty of imprisonment of not less than six (6) years and one (1) day but not more than fifteen (15) years:

1. When two or more bidders agree and submit different bids as if they were bona fide, when they knew that one or more of them was so much higher than the other that it could not be honestly accepted and that the contract will surely be awarded to the pre-arranged lowest bid.
2. When a bidder maliciously submits different Bids through two or more persons, corporations, partnership or any other business entity in which he has interest to create the appearance of competition that does not in fact exist so as to be adjudged as the winning bidder.
3. When two or more bidders enter into an agreement which call upon one to refrain from bidding for procurement contracts, or which call for withdrawal of bids already submitted, or which are otherwise intended to secure an undue advantage to any one of them.
4. When a bidder, by himself or in connivance with others, employ schemes which tend to restrain the natural rivalry of the parties or operates to stifle or suppress competition and thus produce a result disadvantageous to the public.

== Criticisms ==
=== Lack of preference on local suppliers over foreign suppliers ===
During the COVID-19 pandemic, shortages of personal protective equipment (PPE) occurred worldwide, including in the Philippines. To close some of the supply gaps, the Department of Trade and Industry (DTI) asked garment and textile manufacturers to shift to the production of PPE. This call was answered by the Confederation of Philippine Manufacturers of PPE (CPMP). However, the government's procurement law, RA 9184, prevents domestic manufacturers from competing against foreign manufacturers that have the ability to bid at lower prices. Unfortunately, the law has no provisions for preference of domestic products over foreign products. According to Art. X Sec. 34, the government can only award the contract to the bidder with the Lowest Calculated Responsive Bid or Highest Rated Responsive Bid. This forced companies to incur loss, partially close the repurposed factories and lay off around 3,500 workers in December 2020.
