= Hansel Ltd =

Finnish company

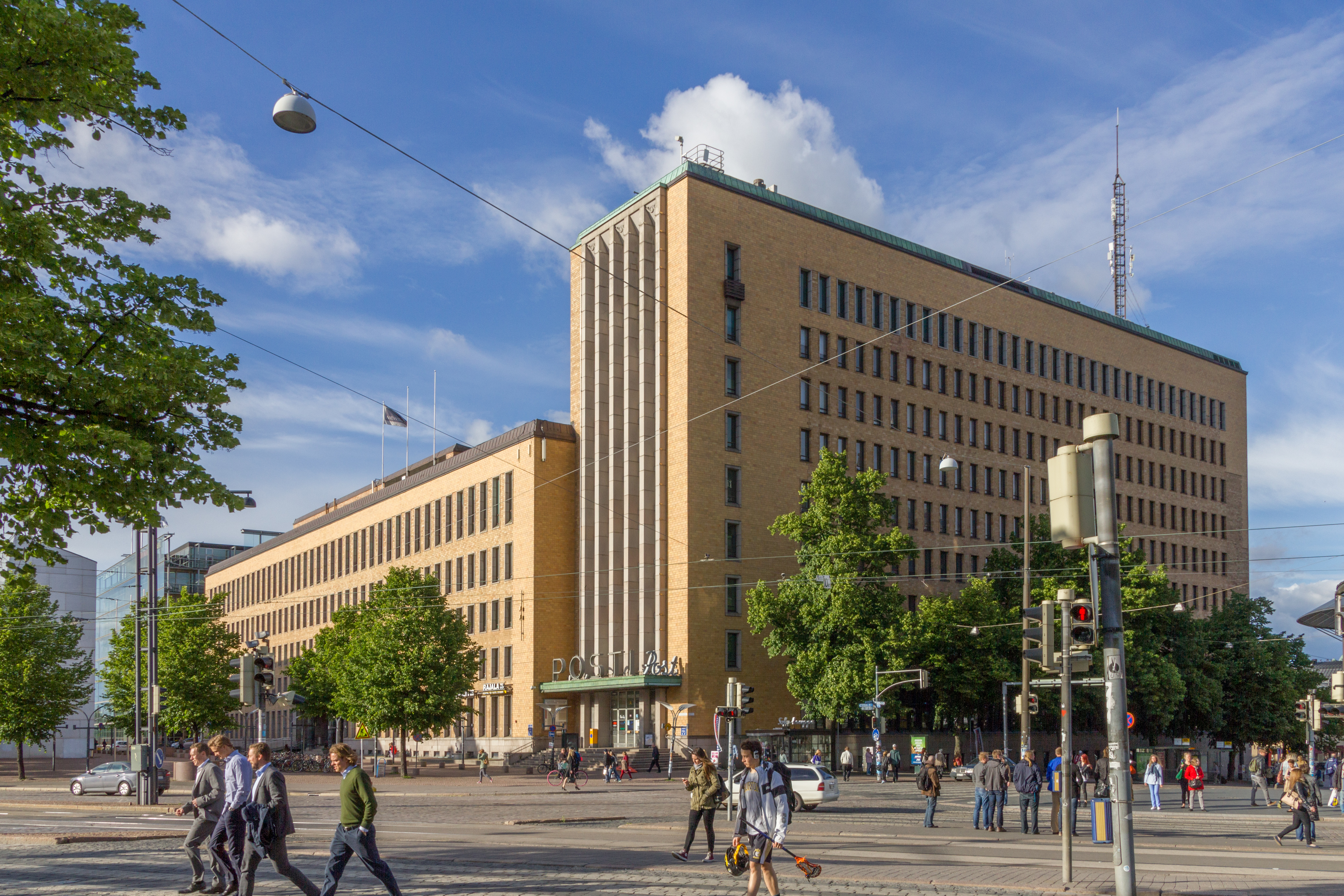
- Hansel is located in the city centre of Helsinki.
- Native name: Hansel Oy
- Type: Government enterprise
- Industry: Public procurement
- Founded: 2003; 23 years ago in Helsinki, Finland
- Headquarters: Helsinki, Finland
- Area served: Finland
- Products: Framework agreements
- Number of employees: 74 (2015)
- Parent: Ministry of Finance, Finland
- Website: www.hansel.fi/en/

Hansel Ltd (Note: Known in Finnish as Hansel Oy.) is a publicly owned non-profit company which operates as the central procurement unit of the Finnish Government. The objective of the operations of the company is to produce savings for the Finnish Government by putting framework agreements for goods and services out to tender. Hansel's tasks and roles are defined in the Public Procurement Act and the State Procurement Strategy.

In 2015, Hansel made government procurement agreements to a value of EUR 697 million (EUR 715 million in 2014). Hansel's customers consist of the ministries, their subordinate bureaus and other government agencies in Finland.

The public procurement that Hansel is involved in refers to the purchase of goods, services and construction work required from external suppliers by the state, municipalities, joint municipal authorities, state-owned enterprises and other procurement units defined under public procurement legislation.

The company is an expert organisation that employs 74 professionals from various fields and that emphasises responsibility in its operations. Hansel operates under the auspices of the Finnish Ministry of Finance.

Similar organisations can be found in most western European countries, for instance the Crown Commercial Service in the United Kingdom, SKI (National Procurement Ltd.) in Denmark and Consip in Italy.
