= List of central purchasing bodies in the United Kingdom =

British public sector purchasing consortia

This is a list of central purchasing bodies serving public sector procurement in the United Kingdom. Central purchasing bodies are also known as "Public Buying Organisations" (PBOs). In May 2010 the National Audit Office estimated that there were just under 50 public buying organisations in the UK.

== Background ==
A "central purchasing body” is defined in the Public Contracts Regulations 2015 as "a contracting authority which provides centralised purchasing activities and which may also provide ancillary purchasing activities". The role of a central purchasing body, as defined in Regulation 37 of the regulations, is to support "the acquisition of supplies or services, or both, intended for contracting authorities", and "the award of public contracts or the conclusion of framework agreements [or dynamic purchasing systems] for works, supplies or services intended for contracting authorities". The definitions are derived from Articles 2(1)(14) and 37 of the European Union's Directive on Public Procurement, Directive 2014/24/EU, transposed into UK legislation in 2015. Similar organisations can be found in other EU Member States, for instance Hansel Ltd. in Finland and Consip in Italy.

The EU rules provide that a contracting authority may use the services of a central purchasing body located in another Member State, and should do so in accordance with the national procurement rules which apply where the central purchasing body is located.

In the UK, central government organisations are required by HM Treasury guidance to use the Government Procurement Service (Crown Commercial Service) in its capacity as a central purchasing body.

== Organisations ==
- Advanced Procurement for Universities and Colleges (APUC), established in 2007, provides central procurement services and expertise for the universities and colleges of Scotland. APUC is based in Stirling.
- Crescent Purchasing Consortium (CPC), established in 1999, owned by the UK further education sector since 2009, and based in Salford, offers framework agreements for the education sector, including colleges, schools and multi-academy trusts. CPL Group, the parent company of the CPC, was recognised as a 'great place to work' by the Great Place to Work Institute in 2021.

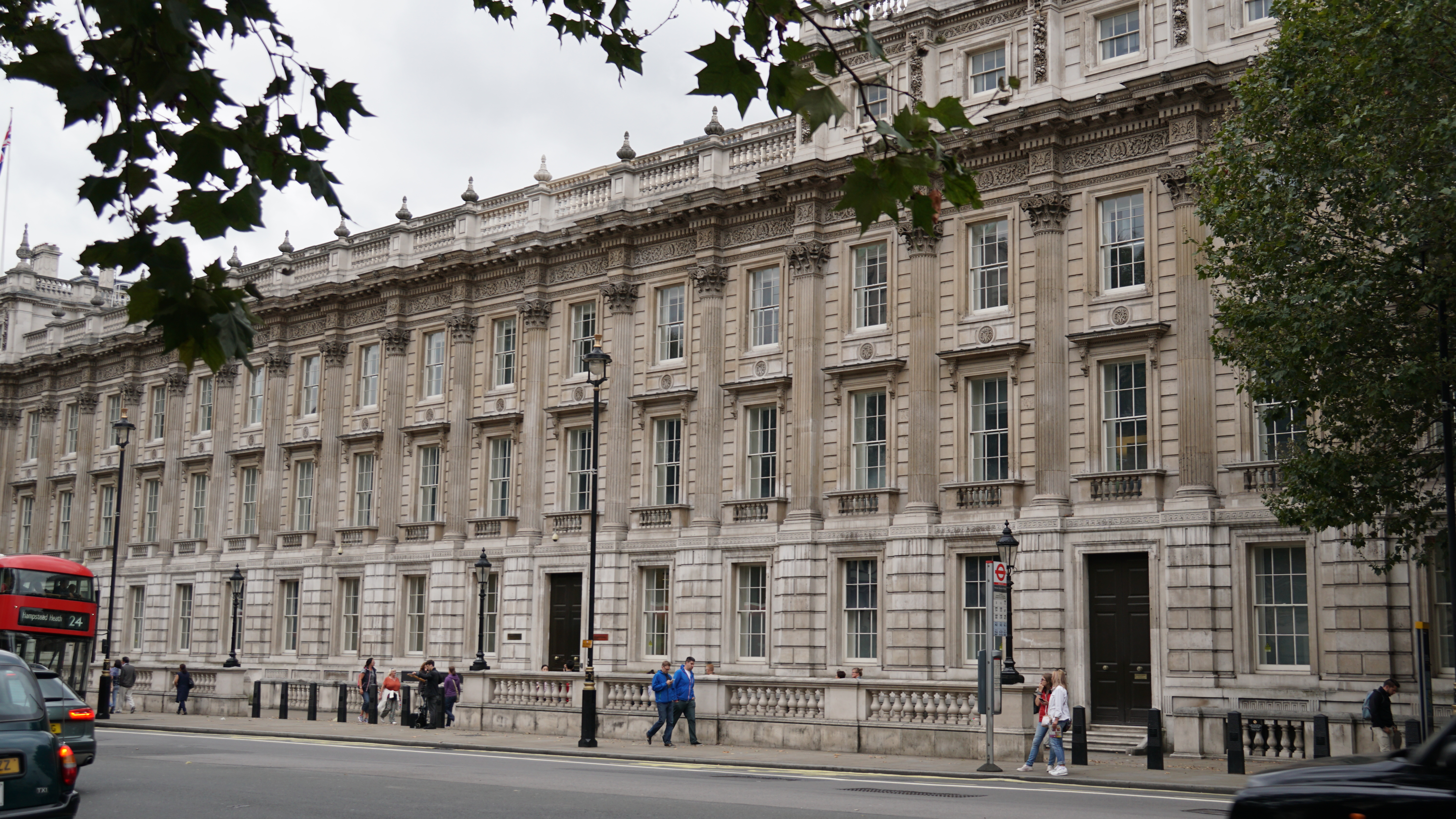
Cabinet Office, London

- Crown Commercial Service (CCS), part of the Cabinet Office, claims to be "the biggest public procurement organisation in the UK".
- Department for Education, operates framework agreements used to procure "traditional" school and public building construction works and for offsite construction.
- Devon County Council: Devon led a consortium of public bodies responsible for a framework agreement known as "Construction Framework South West" (CFSW), now (since 2015) part of the Southern Construction Framework.
- ESPO, formally the Eastern Shires Purchasing Organisation, is a public sector-owned professional buying organisation established in 1981. It operates from a purpose-built warehouse and head office based in Leicester, England, adjacent to the M1, with a distribution centre in South Wales, and is owned and managed by six English local authorities: Leicestershire County Council, Lincolnshire County Council, Cambridgeshire County Council, Norfolk County Council, Warwickshire County Council, and Peterborough City Council. ESPO is one of four organisations which serve the local authorities of England and Wales, along with the Yorkshire Purchasing Organisation, North Eastern Purchasing Organisation and the Central Buying Consortium. A fifth consortium, West Mercia Supplies (WMS), now called Consortium Education, was based in the West Midlands but after being purchased by a private sector company it lost its status as a public sector consortium. The five consortia collectively operated under the name Pro5, until WMS ceased to be part of the public sector. "ESPO" is the trading name of a joint committee of these six local authorities established under the Local Government Act 1972 (section 101 (5) and section 102) and section 9EB of the Local Government Act 2000. Initially its purpose was to serve Leicestershire and Lincolnshire as a joint initiative.
- EN:Procure Ltd. is a consortium consisting of four South Yorkshire Councils – Sheffield City Council, Doncaster Council, Rotherham Council and Barnsley Council, and 4 South Yorkshire ALMOs – Sheffield Homes, Rotherham 2010, Berneslai Homes (Barnsley) and St Leger Homes (Doncaster). In October 2017 Efficiency North Limited changed its name to EN:Procure Limited. EN:Procure's Landsolve framework agreement provides land brokerage and land advice services.

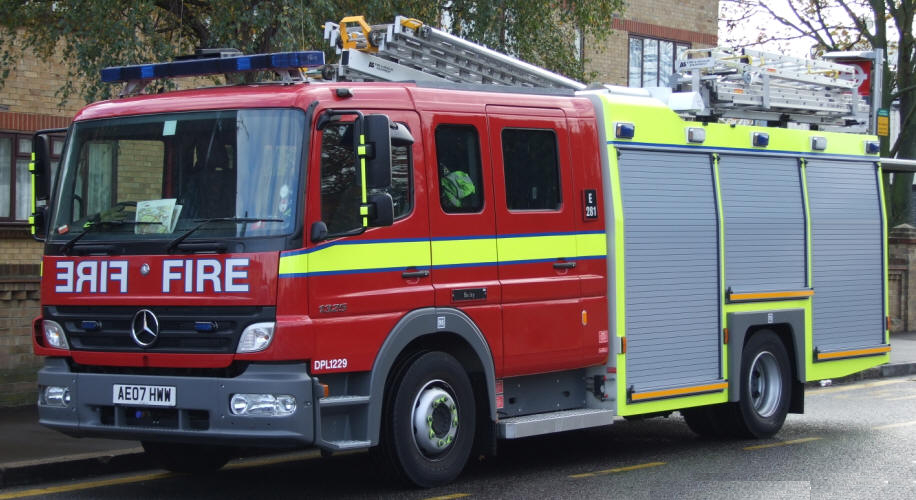
A fire engine of the London Fire Brigade

- Firebuy Ltd., a central government body established in 2006 to provide Fire and Rescue Service procurement at a national level across England. The Department of Communities and Local Government (DCLG) was criticised by the National Audit Office in 2010 for the way it allowed Firebuy to operate, with insufficient usage made of its framework agreements by Fire and Rescue authorities. The claimed savings resulting from collaborative use of its frameworks were less than its setup and running costs. DCLG concluded in 2009 that it would be cost-effective to maintain Firebuy in operation, but it closed on 13 July 2011.
- Fusion21 Members Consortium, a social enterprise based in Prescot, Merseyside.
- Grand Union Housing Group
- Hampshire County Council operates the Southern Modular Building Framework, established in 2018 and available to public authorities in the south of England.
- The Higher Education Purchasing Consortium, Wales (HEPCW) (Welsh: Consortiwm Pwrcasu Addysg Uwch, Cymru), which is supported and funded by the Welsh Higher Education institutions (HEIs).
- Home and Future, a public sector mutual company responsible for commissioning and contracting for child care placements in the south east of England.
- KCS, part of Kent County Council's Commercial Services Group.
- Lancashire Procurement Cluster, a shared procurement and supply chain service jointly operated by Blackpool Teaching Hospitals NHS Foundation Trust, East Lancashire Hospitals NHS Trust and Lancashire Teaching Hospitals NHS Foundation Trust, established in 2017 and based in Leyland.
- LGfL is a not for profit technology company which procures, develops and delivers technology and educational content to schools, Multi-Academy Trusts (MATS) and Local Authorities. LGfL provision includes broadband connections, filtering and safeguarding services, devices and software licences.
- Metropolitan Police Authority: the authority let a framework agreement in 2010 for the supply and delivery of body armour, whose use by police authorities in England and Wales was mandated under government regulations issued in 2011.
- National Police Improvement Agency (NPIA, abolished in 2013): the NPIA let a framework agreement for police vehicles and spare parts in 2010, in conjunction with the National Association of Police Fleet Managers.
- NFP (the National Framework Partnership), based in London, in conjunction with Hyde Housing Association.
- NEPO, the North East Purchasing Organisation, established in 1976. NEPO is operated by The Association of North East Councils Ltd. Formerly based in Newcastle, NEPO moved to new offices in Gateshead in 2022.
- NEUPC, the North Eastern Universities Purchasing Consortium, based in Leeds.
- NHS Shared Business Services (NHS SBS), serving both NHS and non-NHS public bodies
- The NHS also has four procurement hubs, NHS Commercial Solutions, NHS North of England Commercial Procurement Collaborative (NOE CPC, based in Sheffield), East of England NHS Collaborative Procurement Hub and NHS London Procurement Partnership, which support collaborative procurement opportunities for NHS organisations. The four hubs also work together as the "NHS Collaborative Procurement Partnership" providing framework agreements for appropriate areas of high value NHS expenditure.
- North and Mid Wales Trunk Road Agent. The North and Mid Wales Trunk Road Agent (NMWTRA) operates a Highway Mechanical, Electrical and Civil Engineering Framework to enable local authorities in the area to procure highway mechanical, electrical and civil engineering works through 'call off' works orders on the trunk road network and county roads.
- The Northern Ireland Government's Construction and Procurement Delivery (CPD) Collaborative Procurement Team. CPD was previously the Central Procurement Directorate. CPD advises the NI government on procurement strategy as well as establishing framework agreements.
- NWUPC, the North Western Universities Purchasing Consortium, is based in Salford. It was established in 1976 and changed its name from AIMS (Academic Institutions Management Services) to NWUPC in 1986.
- Pagabo, based in Hull, with an office in Motherwell which opened in 2021.
- Procurement Hub, based in Preston, part of Places for People.
- Procure-Plus Ltd., a social housing regeneration consortium based in Manchester, which specialises in the procurement of goods, works and services for the construction and maintenance of social housing properties.
- ProcurePublic, a Central & Cecil Housing Trust Public Buying Organisation with offices in London, which specialises in the procurement of goods, works and services.
- Scape, based in Nottingham, provides construction, consultancy and civil engineering framework agreements. Scape is jointly owned by six local authorities: Derby City Council, Derbyshire County Council, Nottingham City Council, Nottinghamshire County Council, Warwickshire County Council and Gateshead Borough Council.
- Scotland Excel, a collaborative procurement vehicle established in 2008 to support the local authorities of Scotland, lead authority: Renfrewshire Council. Scotland Excel is based in Paisley.
- SUPC, the Southern Universities Purchasing Consortium, based at the University of Reading. SUPC is part of the Southern University Management Services (SUMS) group.
- TEC, the Energy Consortium, a member-owned contracting authority based in Birmingham.
- TUCO, The University Caterers Organisation, based in Manchester, provides procurement services to support in-house caterers in the university sector, along with some services available to institutions who have outsourced their catering operations.
- YORhub, launched in 2008 and managed by East Riding of Yorkshire Council, Leeds City Council, Sheffield City Council, and North Yorkshire Council, operates the YORbuild, YORconsult and YORcivil suites of framework agreements.
- YPO: see Yorkshire Purchasing Organisation
- WECA, the West of England Combined Authority, operates a framework agreement for professional services related to highways.
- West Mercia Energy (WME) is a Public Buying Organisation specialising in the procurement of energy and associated services across the UK public sector. WME originated within West Mercia Supplies in 1989 before becoming West Mercia Energy in 2012. WME is jointly owned by four local authorities: Shropshire Council, Telford & Wrekin Council, Worcestershire Council and Herefordshire Council.

== Collective bodies ==
- The six regional higher education purchasing consortia, along with TEC and TUCO, are known collectively as UK Universities Purchasing Consortia (UKUPC). The heads of these eight consortia together form the UKUPC Board.
- The National Association of Construction Frameworks represents 11 framework agreements operating in the construction sector.
- The Pan Government Energy Project, now part of the Cabinet Office's Efficiency and Reform Group, designed and recommended a way for the public sector to buy its energy "via an aggregated, flexible, risk managed strategy via an appropriate [PBO] intermediary".
