= Public Procurement Regulatory Authority =

Pakistani autonomous government body

- Formation: 2002; 24 years ago
- Headquarters: Lahore, Pakistan
- Website: www.ppra.gov.pk

The Public Procurement Regulatory Authority (PPRA) is an autonomous regulatory authority in Pakistan responsible for prescribing regulations and procedures for public procurement by Government of Pakistan-owned public sector organizations and monitoring of procurement undertaken by other public sector organizations under the Public Procurement Regulatory Authority Ordinance of May 2002. The PPRA Board consists of six ministerial appointments from central government departments, three private members and the Authority's managing director.

It is also endowed with the responsibility of monitoring procurement by public sector agencies/organizations and has been delegated necessary powers under the Public Procurement Regulatory Authority Ordinance 2002.

== History ==
Amendments have been made in the Rules vide S.R.O. No. 442(I)/2020 dated "15th May, 2020" and vide S.R.O. No. 834(I)/2021 dated "28th June, 2021."

All the Tenders i.e. Invitation to Bids are published on its official website. Procurement Plans of Procuring Agencies are also available on website. Standard Bidding Documents are also available on the website i.e. Public Procurement Regulatory Authority (www.ppra.org.pk).

In 2019 the authority was accused of making 32 appointments in a non-transparent manner, and the office of the Auditor General of Pakistan raised objections to the appointments.
