= Mémorial =

Government gazette of Luxembourg

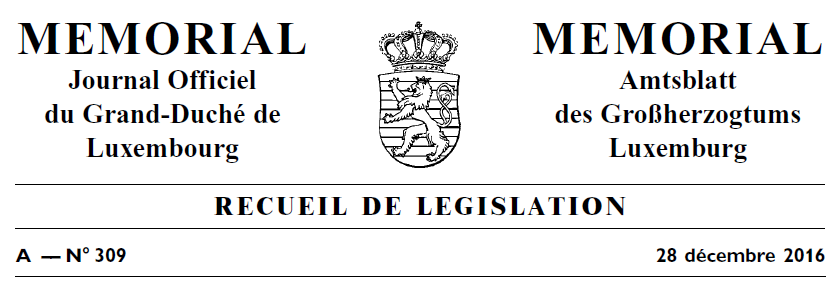
Publication of Memorial in 2016

Mémorial is the official gazette of the Grand Duchy of Luxembourg. It is published by the Central Legislation Service (French: Service central de législation), an agency of the government of Luxembourg. Until the Second World War, Mémorial was published in both French and German, which were the two official languages of Luxembourg. Since the war, it has been published in only French (even though German remains an official language, and Luxembourgish has also become one).

Under Grand Ducal decree of 9 January 1961, the Mémorial was to be subdivided into three separate publications:

- Mémorial A, containing text of legislation, Grand Ducal decrees, and European Union directives. It was established by Grand Ducal decree on 22 October 1842.
- Mémorial B, containing administrative instructions; changes in government policies not requiring a form of legislation, directive, or decree; and edicts of importance to only specific individuals or for only a very short period of time. It was established by Grand Ducal decree on 20 April 1854.
- Mémorial C, containing personal and financial matters, including the foundation, liquidation, and restructuring of corporations. It was established by statute on 10 August 1915. The final issue of Mémorial C was published on 27 July 2016 with the information now found on the website of Trade Register and Companies (RCS) since 1 June 2016.

Starting 1 January 2017, the Mémorial is no longer published in print and is now solely an electronic publication. The current arrangement and separation of duties is currently dictated by Law of 23 December 2016.
