= Chartered Institute of Procurement & Supply =

Professional association

The Chartered Institute of Procurement & Supply (CIPS), formerly the Chartered Institute of Purchasing & Supply, is a global professional body working for the procurement and supply profession in many regions of the world. It promotes best practice and provides services for non-professionals and its over 64,000 members in 180 countries.

It received its Royal Charter from Queen Elizabeth II in 1992, and first offered its members Chartered Status in 2014.

CIPS promotes and develops high standards of professional skill, ability, and integrity among all those engaged in procurement and supply chain management.

== CIPS office locations ==
Formerly based in Easton on the Hill, near Stamford, Lincolnshire, but just inside Northamptonshire, its headquarters are now located at WestPoint in Peterborough. It also has offices around the world and partnerships in other countries where it has a presence:

- CIPS Australia and New Zealand
- CIPS Hong Kong Branch
- CIPS Middle East and North Africa. In the Middle East and North Africa (MENA) region, CIPS has branches in Abu Dhabi and Dubai, Egypt and Qatar.
- Ghana office in Accra, opened in 2017
- CIPS India opened in 2026, and is based in Noida, to the east of New Delhi.

== Membership ==
Full membership (known as MCIPS) is available to suitably experienced procurement and supply management staff who have completed the organisation's qualifications at levels 4, 5 and 6. CIPS first offered its members Chartered Status in 2014; members are eligible for Chartered Status after completing a programme of continuing professional development including the successful completion of the CIPS ethics test.

== CIPS Foundation ==
The CIPS Foundation is a "linked charity" which promotes education in purchasing and supply.

== Publications ==
The institute's official magazine is Supply Management, published monthly by Haymarket.

It also hosts the CIPS Futures Podcast.

== See also ==
- Procurement
- Supply Chain
- Purchasing
- Institute for Supply Management, professional body for procurement and supply management in the United States
