= Supply Management (magazine) =

British magazine

- September 2013 cover
- Categories: Procurement and supply chain
- Frequency: Monthly
- First issue: 14 March 1996
- Company: Haymarket Media Group
- Country: United Kingdom
- Language: English
- Website: www.supplymanagement.com

Supply Management is the official magazine of the Chartered Institute of Purchasing & Supply (CIPS), published by Haymarket Media Group. The magazine is published monthly and features the latest news, view and analysis for procurement and supply chain professionals worldwide. The website provides daily news and opinion and exclusive content, in addition to access to more than 15,000 articles.

There is also a dedicated jobs website – jobs.supplymanagement.com – which features the latest vacancies in the UK and internationally.

Supply Management was relaunched in January 2016 with a campaign to end slavery in the supply chain.

== History ==
The first issue of the magazine was published on 14 March 1996 and incorporated Purchasing and Supply Management and Procurement Weekly. Purchasing and Supply Management was itself preceded by The Purchasing Journal which ran between the 1950s and 1970s.

The magazine was redesigned in 2006, changing sizes from A4 to US Letter. The first issue of the new design was published on 21 September 2006.

In March 2011 the magazine switched from a fortnightly to a monthly publication. The November 2013 edition was the first to be sent also to CIPS members in Australasia.

In January 2016, Supply Management was re-launched under the ownership of Haymarket Media Group.

== Awards ==
In 2008 Supply Management was named magazine of the year by MemCom.

The magazine also won Supplement of the Year at the Business Travel Journalism Awards in 2010.
