= Yorkshire Purchasing Organisation =

British Purchasing consortia

YPO
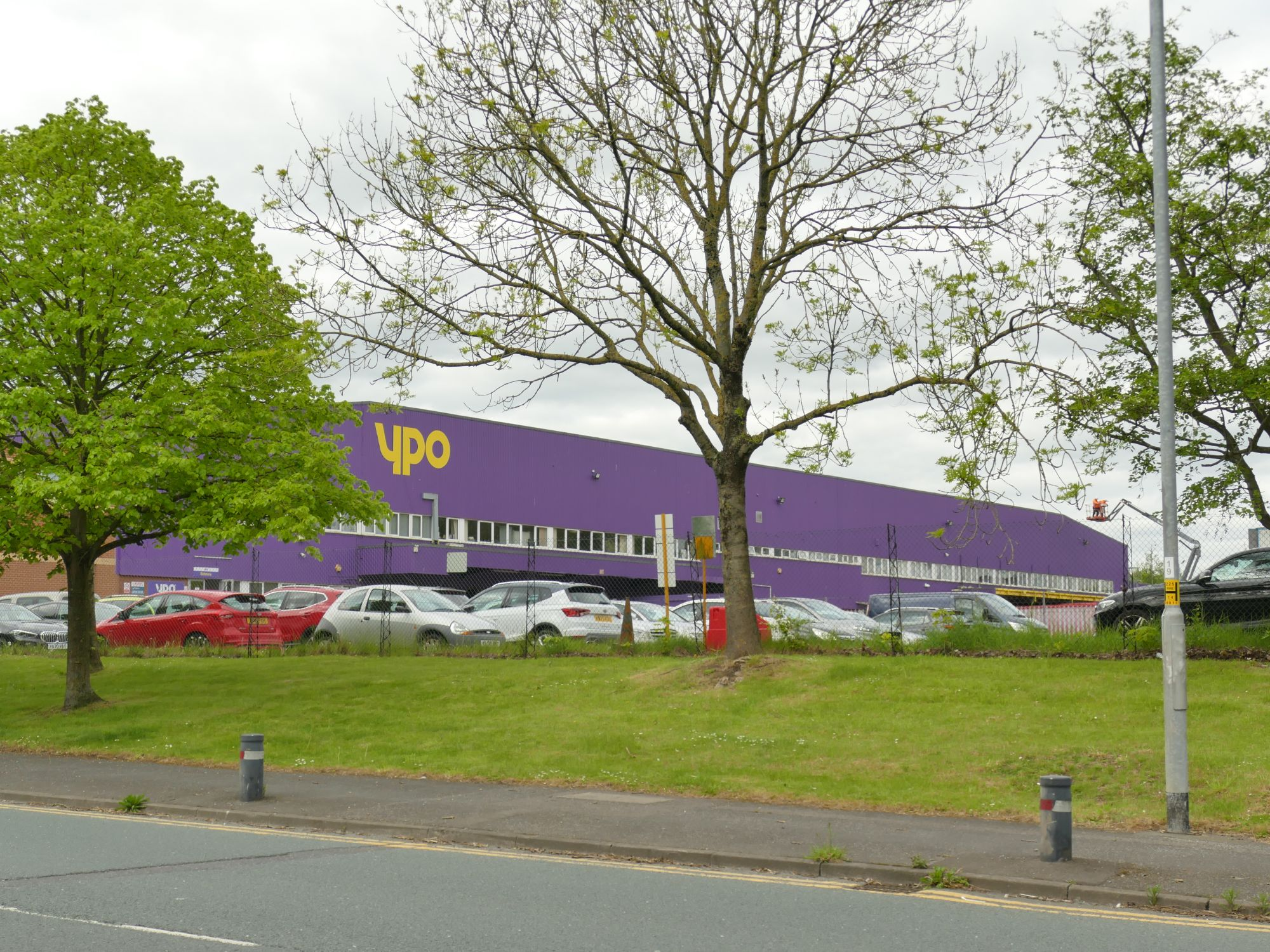
- Facility in Wakefield
- Company type: Public sector
- Industry: Public Sector Procurement
- Founded: 1974
- Headquarters: Wakefield, Yorkshire, United Kingdom
- Revenue: UK£ 2bn
- Website: http://www.ypo.co.uk/

YPO, also referred to as Yorkshire Purchasing Organisation, is a publicly owned central purchasing body based in Wakefield, Yorkshire. It is owned and governed by a consortium of county, metropolitan and borough councils in Yorkshire and the North West England. It provides a wide range of resources and services to schools, councils, charities, emergency services, and other public sector organisations. It claims to be the 'largest formally constituted public sector buying organisation in the UK'.

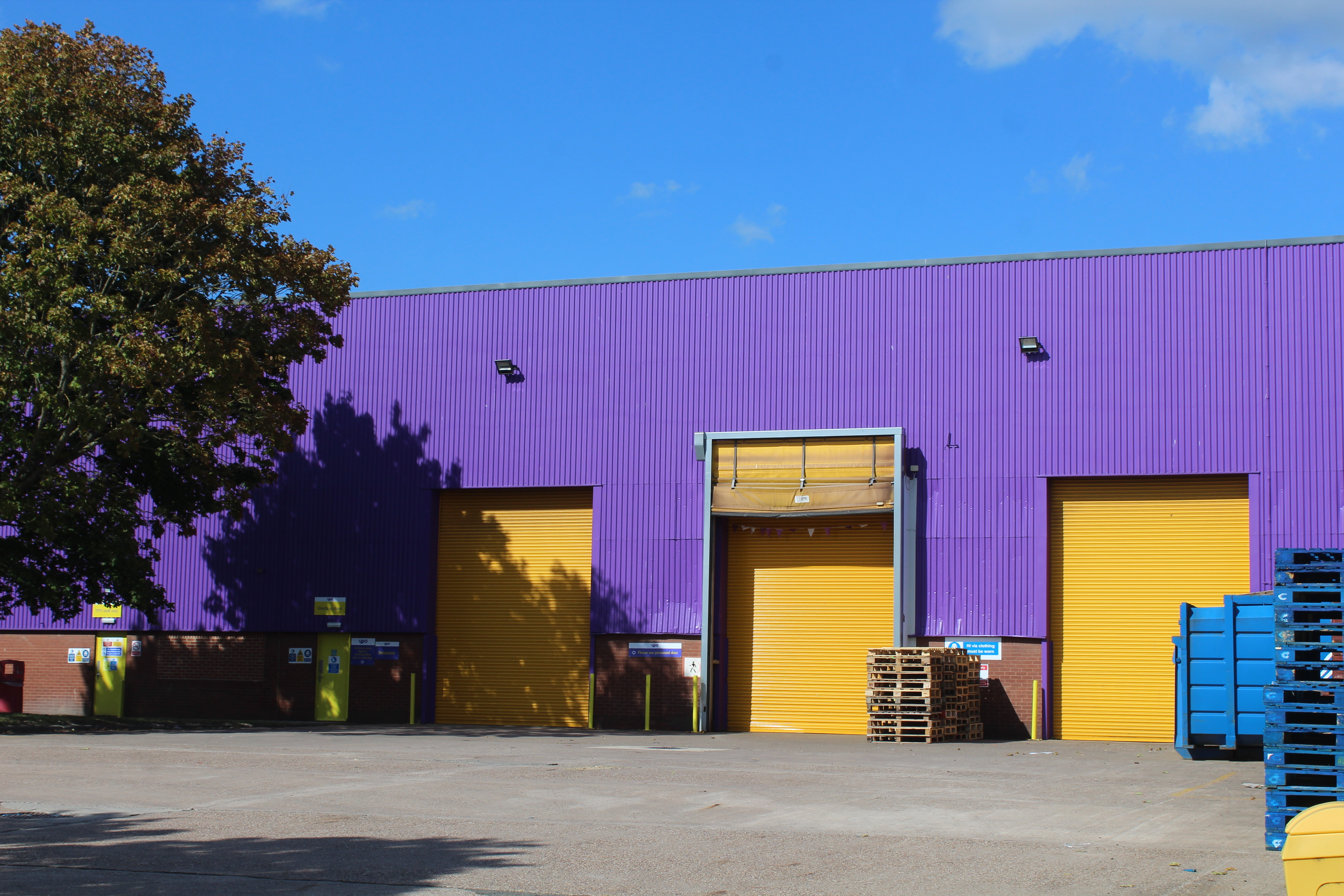
YPO warehouse at the Wakefield 41 industrial park

YPO was formed as the Yorkshire Purchasing Organisation in 1974 as a joint committee of 8 local authorities, Barnsley, Bradford, Calderdale, Doncaster, Kirklees, North Yorkshire, Rotherham and Wakefield, all based in Yorkshire, hence the original name. These were joined in the 1980's by Bolton, Knowsley, St Helen's and Wigan and finally the City of York Council became a Unitary Authority in 1996 to form the 13 Founder Members of today. The Organisation grew through the 1970s and 80s and rapidly in the 1990s as schools gained power of their own budgets under the Local Management of Schools provisions of the Education Reform Act 1988. The organisation is unsubsidised and budgets to make a small surplus each year, with profits returned to member authorities and customers.
