= Xfinity =

American cable provider

Comcast Cable Communications, LLC
- Current logo used since 2025
- Trade name: Xfinity
- Formerly: Comcast Cable (1981–2010)
- Type: Division
- Industry: Telecommunications
- Founded: April 2, 1981; 45 years ago
- Headquarters: Philadelphia, Pennsylvania, U.S.
- Area served: United States
- Key people: Dave Brown (president & CEO)
- Products: Cable television, Mobile, Broadband internet, VoIP phone, Home security
- Revenue: ▲US$$66.318 billion (2017)
- Operating income: ▲US$21.17 billion (2017)
- Total assets: ▲US$186.95 billion (2017)
- Total equity: ▲US$69.45 billion (2017)
- Parent: Comcast
- Subsidiaries: Effectv; Comcast Wholesale; Xfinity Mobile; Now (operated by Sky Group in the United Kingdom); Xumo (50%)
- Website: xfinity.com

Comcast Cable Communications, doing business as Xfinity, is an American telecommunications business segment and division of Comcast Corporation. It is used to market consumer cable television, internet, telephone, and wireless services provided by the company. The brand was first introduced in 2010; prior to that, these services were marketed primarily under the Comcast name.

As of 2023 its CEO is Dave Watson, its chairman is Brian L. Roberts, and its CFO is Catherine Avgiris. Xfinity went from US$23.7 billion in revenue in 2007 to $50.04 billion in 2016.

== Branding ==
Previous logos

Comcast logo from 1984 to 2000 before it was replaced with the crescent logo.

Comcast logo from January 1, 2000 to January 27, 2013 as a corporate logo, and until February 2, 2010 for their cable unit.

Xfinity logo from February 3, 2010 to October 31, 2017.

Xfinity logo from November 1, 2017 to August 26, 2021.

Xfinity's current logo since 2021 after Tokyo 2020. The red is replaced with purple.

On February 3, 2010, Comcast began to re-brand its consumer triple play service offerings under the name Xfinity; Comcast Digital Cable was renamed "Xfinity TV", Comcast Digital Voice became "Xfinity Voice", and Comcast High-Speed Internet became "Xfinity Internet". The re-branding and an associated promotional campaign were scheduled to coincide with the 2010 Winter Olympics.

The rebranding was characterized by the media as an effort to sidestep the negativity of the Comcast brand. Time considered Xfinity to be among the worst corporate renamings of all time, asking "Will the name change work? Probably not, but at least it'll sound a bit edgier when you're put on hold...with Xfinity."

== Internet service ==
=== Comcast Internet availability by state ===
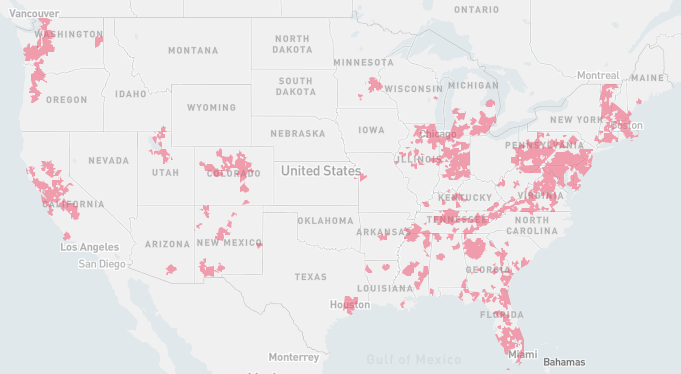
Xfinity availability by ZIP code in 2016

State	Overall potential coverage area
District of Columbia	97.9%
Massachusetts	85.4%
Utah	78.5%
Illinois	75.9%
Colorado	75.9%
Washington	73.1%
Pennsylvania	69.1%
Maryland	69%
New Hampshire	68.8%
Michigan	60.3%
Oregon	57.9%
Indiana	57.7%
Georgia	56.4%
Tennessee	56.0%
New Mexico	55.4%
Florida	52.7%
Connecticut	50.6%
Minnesota	45.6%
Virginia	41.5%
Mississippi	31.9%
California	31.8%

Comcast is the largest provider of cable internet access in the United States, servicing 40% of the market in 2011. As of July 26, 2018, Comcast has 26.5 million high-speed internet customers.

Comcast began offering internet services in late 1996, when it helped found the @Home Network, which sold internet service through Comcast's cable lines. The agreement continued after @Home's merger with Excite. When the combined company Excite@Home filed for bankruptcy in 2002, Comcast moved their roughly 950,000 internet customers completely onto their own network.

Along with the high price of internet subscriptions, Comcast charges users an additional $15.00/month to rent a cable modem. This fee has been seen by some as unfair, but is waived for customers who buy their own modems. Comcast charges $20 for internet installation, but the fee is waived for customers who opt to install themselves.

In 2011, Comcast launched its "Internet Essentials" program, which offers low-cost internet service to families with children who qualify for free or reduced price school lunches. The U.S. Federal Communications Commission (FCC) required this budget service as a condition for allowing Comcast's acquisition of NBCUniversal in January 2011. Of an estimated 2.60 million households eligible for the program, about 220,000 households participate in the program as of June 2013. A similar program is available from other internet providers through the non-profit Connect2compete.org. Comcast has stated that the program will accept new customers for a total of three years. In March 2014, as he met with FCC concerning the Time Warner Cable merger, Comcast vice president David Cohen told reporters that the internet essentials program will be extended indefinitely.

At the 2017 Consumer Electronics Show, Comcast unveiled a new software platform for its Arris 1682G and Cisco 3941T/3939 modems, which would offer a redesigned configuration interface, support for remote setup and management via an Xfinity mobile app, and enabling integration of supported smart home devices with other Xfinity platforms such as Xfinity TV. The new platform launched under the brand xFi in May 2017. Comcast also unveiled the xFi Advanced Gateway, a new router designed to facilitate faster Wi-Fi speeds, including support for 802.11ac Wave 2, as well as internal support for Bluetooth Low Energy, Thread, and Zigbee for finer integration with Internet of things devices, and support for an accompanying line of Wi-Fi extenders (manufactured by Plume).

In December 2022, Comcast announced that it had trialed symmetric, 10-gigabit service using DOCSIS 4.0; this service was deployed for selected Gigabit Pro fiber business customers in June 2023. At this time, Comcast began to market all Xfinity broadband services as "the Xfinity 10G Network". In 2024, the National Advertising Division of the Better Business Bureau (BBB) ruled that Comcast's marketing of its broadband service as the "Xfinity 10G Network" was misleading since DOCSIS isn't capable of 10 gigabit end-user speeds, and therefore requires installation of a fiber optic local loop that is not available to all customers. The division recommended that Comcast promote this as aspirational technology, or discontinue use of the branding. In January 2024, Comcast agreed to stop using the "Xfinity 10G Network" branding in this manner.

=== Xfinity WiFi ===
Comcast operates a network of public Wi-Fi hotspots for Xfinity internet subscribers known as Xfinity WiFi, which consists of a mixture of hotspots installed in public locations and businesses, and those generated by supported Xfinity home gateways on an opt-out basis. Users on the "Performance" tier or higher receive unlimited usage of these hotspots after signing in with their Xfinity Account. By default, all dual-band Xfinity home gateways operate both a private network, and a public network with the SSID "xfinitywifi". To conserve bandwidth, these hotspots are capped at 5 simultaneous users. Customers can opt out of providing Xfinity WiFi through either the Comcast website, or by installing a third-party router.

Comcast has received criticism for this practice, with critics arguing that the company was abusing customer resources (including bandwidth and electricity) to provide services for other customers, as well as concerns regarding security, and liability for actions performed by users while connected to these home hotspots; in 2014, a proposed class action lawsuit was filed in California, citing violations of the Computer Fraud and Abuse Act and similar state laws for these reasons. Comcast defended the service by stating that the public Wi-Fi is firewalled from devices connected to the in-home network, was designed to have minimal bandwidth impact to "support robust usage", and that customers would not be liable for the actions of other users, as abusers can be traced by means of the Xfinity account they used to sign into the network. The lawsuit was taken to arbitration.

In the wake of Hurricane Irma, all Xfinity WiFi hotspots in Florida were opened to non-Comcast subscribers.

=== Data cap ===
Initially, Comcast had a policy of terminating broadband customers who use "excessive bandwidth", a term the company refused to define in its terms of service, which once said only that a customer's use should not "represent (in the sole judgment of Comcast) an overly large burden on the network". Company responses to press inquiries suggested a limit of several hundred gigabytes per month. In September 2007, Comcast spokesman Charlie Douglas said the company defined "excessive use" as the equivalent of 30,000 songs, 250,000 pictures or 13 million emails in a month.

Comcast introduced a 250 GB monthly bandwidth cap to its broadband service on October 1, 2008, combining both upload and download towards the monthly limit. If a user exceeded the cap three times within six months, the customer's residential services may have been terminated for one year. A spokesperson stated that this policy had been in place for some time, but was the first time Comcast has announced a specific usage limit.

As the cap provoked a strongly negative reaction from some, Comcast decided to modify its policy in 2012. Under the new system, the cap was replaced with a data threshold and increased to 300GB in some markets, and consumers who exceed this threshold are charged $10 for every 50 GB above the limit. Customers could purchase a $30 add-on for "unlimited" data. In a leaked memo, Comcast employees were instructed to state that the policy is for "Fairness and providing a more flexible policy to our customers", and not for controlling network congestion.

On April 27, 2016, Comcast announced that it would raise its data threshold in trial markets to 1 TB by June 2016; the company stated that "more than 99 percent of our customers do not come close to using a terabyte." The decision to raise the cap came following implication of increased scrutiny surrounding them by the FCC: in its approval of Charter Communications' purchase of Time Warner Cable, the Commission stipulated that Charter must not implement caps. As previously, a $10 overage fee is charged for every 50 GB above the limit, and customers can purchase an add-on for "unlimited" data, but its price was increased to $50. In October 2016, Comcast announced that bandwidth thresholds would be implemented in the majority of its markets (outside of New York and the northeast) beginning November 1, 2016. The data usage plan does not currently apply to the Gigabit Pro tier of service, Business Internet customers, customers on Bulk Internet agreements, and customers with Prepaid Internet.

On November 23, 2020, Comcast announced a new 1.2TB data cap will be implemented for all of the remaining areas in the northeast by March 2021. However, it was postponed due to pressure from the Pennsylvanian attorney general due to concerns on how it would impact customers, especially for those working at home during the COVID-19 pandemic.

=== Network management and peering ===
In September 2007, a rumor emerged among tech blogs that Comcast was throttling or even blocking internet traffic transmitted via the BitTorrent protocol. Comcast vehemently denied the accusations of blocking traffic, stating that "Comcast does not, has not, and will not block any Web sites or online applications, including peer-to-peer services", and that "We engage in reasonable network management". After more widespread confirmation that Comcast was throttling BitTorrent traffic, Comcast said it occasionally delayed BitTorrent traffic in order to speed up other kinds of data, but declined to go into specifics. Following the announcement of an official investigation by the FCC, Comcast voluntarily ended the traffic discrimination. The FCC investigation concluded that Comcast's throttling policies were illegal. However, after filing a lawsuit in September 2008, Comcast overturned the illegality of its network management in 2010, as the court ruled that the FCC lacked the authority to enforce net neutrality under the FCC's then current regulatory policy. The court suggested instead of its current framework, the FCC move to a common carrier structure to justify its enforcement. As of February 2014, the FCC has announced a new justification, but avoided the more extensive regulation required by the common carrier framework.

In 2010, Netflix signed an agreement with Level 3 Communications to carry its data. Shortly after, Level 3 entered a heated dispute concerning whether Level 3 would have to pay Comcast to bridge their respective networks, in an agreement known as peering. The disagreement continued as Netflix's current carrier, Cogent Communications, explicitly placed blame for Netflix bottlenecks on Comcast and several other ISPs. In February 2014, after rumors surfaced that Comcast and Netflix had reached an unspecified agreement, the companies confirmed that Netflix was paying Comcast to connect to its network. The details of the agreement are not public, and speculation disagrees about whether the agreement is a precedent against net neutrality, or a continuation of normal peering agreements.

== Cable telephony ==
Xfinity Voice (formerly Comcast Digital Voice) is a Voice Over IP cable telephony service that was launched in 2005 in some markets, and to all of Comcast's markets in 2006. Comcast's older service, Comcast Digital Phone, continued to offer service for a brief period, until Comcast shut it down around in late 2007. In 2009, after completing transition from their old service, Comcast had 7.6 million voice customers. As of the end of 2013, Comcast Digital Voice had reached 10.7 million subscribers.

At the start of 2012, Comcast stood as the United States' third-largest residential line provider, supplying 9.34 million residential lines.

Xfinity Voice allows communication over the internet using VoIP, but uses a private network instead of a public IP address, which allows Comcast to prioritize voice data during heavy traffic. In technical terms, on Comcast's Hybrid Fiber Coaxial network, calls are placed into individual Unsolicited Grant Service flows, based on DOCSIS 1.1 Quality of service standards. For the customer, this has the benefit of preventing network congestion from interfering with call quality. Other, non-Comcast VoIP services on Comcast's network must use the lower priority public IP addresses. This separation of traffic into separate flows, or Smart pipe, has been criticised as a violation of net neutrality, whereby all data traffic should be treated equally—dumb pipe. The practice was questioned by the FCC in 2009. In their response, Comcast stated that services that use telecommunications are not necessarily telecommunications services, and said that the FCC's designation of Comcast Digital Voice as an information service exempted it from telecommunications service regulations on traditional landline. Comcast also said that because Comcast Voice was a separate service, it was unfair to directly compare the data for Comcast Voice with the data for other VoIP services.

Because telephone services over VoIP are not automatically tied to a physical address, Xfinity Voice utilizes E911 to help 911 emergency service operators to automatically locate the source of the 911 call. Voice calls are delivered as a digital stream over the Comcast network, signal is converted to analog plain old telephone service lines at the cable modem, which outputs on standard physical analog style RJ-11 ports.

== Cable television ==
Comcast's cable television customers peaked in 2007, with about 24.8 million customers. Comcast had lost customers every year since. However, the first quarterly gain in customers since their peak occurred in the fourth quarter of 2013. As of the end of 2013, Comcast had a total of 21.7 million cable customers. The average cost of Comcast's Digital Basic cable subscription had increased 72% from 2003 to 2012. In the fourth quarter of 2015, Comcast got 89,000 new video subscribers. This was their highest gain since 2007.

Comcast also charges a Regulatory Recovery Fee of varying size(s) with their Digital Basic cable subscription in order to "recover additional costs associated with governmental programs". Since January 2014, Comcast has also charged a Broadcast TV Fee to "defray the rising costs of retransmitting broadcast television signals(sic)."

In May 2012, Comcast softlaunched X1 (codenamed "Xcalibur"), a new hardware and software platform for its television services in Boston. It features wider support for internet content and video streaming apps, and a remote control with voice recognition input. X1 was scheduled for nationwide availability by the end of 2013. Comcast has licensed the X1 platform as middleware to other providers, including Cox Cable (as "Cox Contour"), and Canadian providers Shaw (as "Shaw BlueCurve TV"), Rogers (as "Rogers Ignite TV") and Vidéotron (as "Helix"). Rogers (which had meanwhile acquired Shaw) announced a deeper technology partnership with Comcast in April 2024, and began rebranding its cable TV and internet products as "Rogers Xfinity" later that year.

In 2019, Comcast launched Xfinity Flex, an add-on for Xfinity Internet that offers subscribers a digital media player based on the X1 platform with access to over-the-top media services. The service is marketed as an alternative to the full Xfinity TV service for cord-cutters In October 2021, Comcast launched XClass TV, a line of Hisense-manufactured smart TVs based on X1, and sold exclusively through Walmart; they marked the first X1-based product to be sold directly at retail to consumers. In 2022, both Xfinity Flex and XClass TV were brought under Comcast's Xumo joint venture with Charter Communications, and rebranded as Xumo Stream Box and Xumo TV respectively.

=== Retransmission fees ===
Beginning in the mid-2000s, the prices of retransmission fees, requirements for cable companies to retransmit television broadcasters content, have become more expensive. These fees (and the arguments over them between broadcasters and distributors) caused blackouts of certain (influential) television programming. The U.S. Federal Communications Commission (FCC) then reviewed its rules for broadcasters and distributors to make any possible changes to them in response to the high-profile blackouts. Comcast has had ten year agreements with CBS, Disney, and the Fox Broadcasting Company for distributing and reproducing content. The financial details of the deals are not known.

Due to retransmission fees becoming more expensive every year, broadcasters pay more expensive substantial fees for retransmitting broadcast television. Comcast instated Broadcast TV Fee (as a part of the Digital Basic cable subscription) to gain lost profit from paying more expensive fees to retransmit programming content. Comcast's subsidiary, NBCUniversal, was one of several broadcasters party to American Broadcasting Cos. v. Aereo, Inc., over the question of whether Aereo is a retransmitter (which would require it to pay retransmission fees). The case was decided on June 25, 2014, in favor of the broadcasters in a 6–3 decision.

== Home security and automation ==
Comcast has a home security and home automation service known as Xfinity Home in some of its service areas. The service has a burglar and fire alarm, surveillance cameras, and wireless motion sensors put on doorways and windows to detect when said doorway or window was opened, and to detect when someone was in a house when it was vacant.

== Xfinity Mobile ==
Xfinity Mobile
- Industry: Telecommunications
- Founded: April 6, 2017
- Key people: Greg Butz (President)
- Website: www.xfinity.com/mobile/

On April 6, 2017, Comcast launched Xfinity Mobile, a mobile virtual network operator (MVNO) on the Verizon mobile network.

Xfinity Mobile provides prepaid (with users able to purchase data in 1 GB bundles) and monthly unlimited plans, with the latter throttled after 20 GB of use. The service is sold exclusively to Comcast internet subscribers, and includes access to Xfinity WiFi.

Analysts perceived Xfinity Mobile as being a response to AT&T's acquisition of DirecTV, which added the national satellite provider alongside its existing wireline and wireless services, and an increased push towards mobile television. In the third quarter of 2018, Xfinity Mobile surpassed 1 million subscribers. On May 18, 2020, Xfinity Mobile announced plans with 5G data.

== Xfinity 3D ==
Comcast ran a 3DTV channel known as Xfinity 3D from February 20, 2011 until December 16, 2014, on Xfinity cable systems. The channel mainly featured NBC Sports and Universal Pictures content in the format, along with content from other studios and demonstration films in the 3D format.

== Comcast Business ==
In addition to residential consumers, Comcast also serves businesses as customers, targeting small businesses with fewer than 20 employees and mid-sized businesses of 20–500 employees. In 2009, Minneapolis–Saint Paul became the first city in which Comcast Business Class offered 100 Mbit/s Internet service, which includes Microsoft Communication Services. Comcast Business Class Internet service does not have a bandwidth usage cap.

Comcast Business services used to be sold exclusively through direct sales employees. In March 2011, Comcast created an indirect sales channel called the Solution Provider Program, a comprehensive indirect channel program that enables telecommunications consultants and system integrators to sell Comcast's services such as Business Class Internet, Voice, and high-capacity Ethernet services to small and mid-market businesses. The program offers recurring commissions for sales partners based on monthly revenue, and Comcast will provide, install, manage and bill for these services. For the initial launch of the Solutions Provider Program, Comcast enlisted three national master representatives—Telarus, based in Salt Lake City, Utah; Intelisys, based in Petaluma, California; and Telecom Brokerage Inc (TBI), based in Chicago. Sub-agent sales partners must work with one of these three partners in the early stages of the program.

== Sponsorships ==
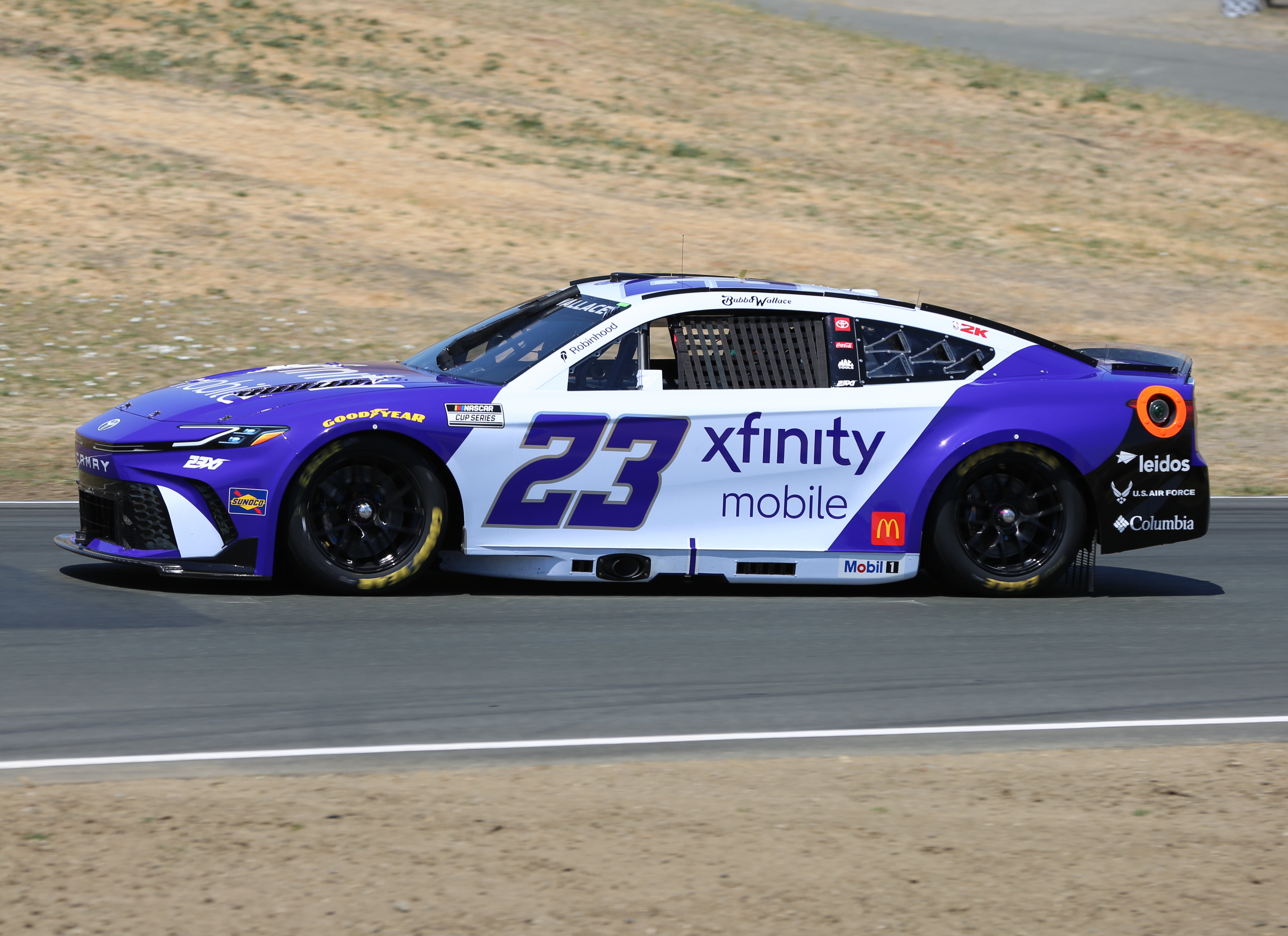
Bubba Wallace's Xfinity-sponsored No. 23 car in 2025

In 2015, Comcast became a sponsor of NASCAR, with Xfinity named one of the "Premier Partners" of the NASCAR Cup Series, and title sponsor of NASCAR's second-tier national series, which became known as the NASCAR Xfinity Series. In February 2025, Comcast and NASCAR announced that it would renew its sponsorship of the Cup Series, and that Xfinity would begin sponsoring NASCAR's fastest lap award across its three national series. However, Comcast did not renew its sponsorships of the Xfinity Series after the 2025 season, with O'Reilly Auto Parts later announced as its new title sponsor beginning in 2026. Since 2020, Xfinity has sponsored the penultimate race in the Cup Series, the Xfinity 500 at Martinsville Speedway.

In May 2025, Xfinity Mobile became the new naming rights sponsor of Philadelphia's Wells Fargo Center, renaming it Xfinity Mobile Arena. The arena is managed by Comcast subsidiary Comcast Spectacor.

In 2025, as part of NBCUniversal's rights to the league, Xfinity was named the official television provider of the NBA and WNBA.

== Litigation ==
In August 2016, Comcast was sued by the state of Washington under its consumer protection laws, alleging that the company had misled consumers on the extent of its "Service Protection Plan" (SPP) by charging for repairs that agents claimed were covered under the plan, and knowingly used improper credit screening practices. In December 2017, the lawsuit was amended with additional allegations that Comcast customer service agents sometimes made misleading claims about the costs of the SPP (sometimes claiming it was free), or enrolled consumers into the SPP without being told about the plan, suggesting that "more than half" of its subscribers had been enrolled without their consent. The state accused Comcast of deleting customer service calls that had been requested as evidence; the company stated that it was "not under any obligation to preserve them", that it deleted customer service calls routinely, and accused the state of only "listening to 150 calls when we gave 4,500 of them." In June 2019, King County Superior Court judge Timothy Bradshaw partially ruled in favor of the state of Washington, fining Comcast $9.1 million and ordering the company to pay restitution to affected consumers within 60 days. Bradshaw ruled that Comcast misrepresented consumers about the costs of the SPP and enrolled customers onto the plan without their consent. However, he found that the state did not provide sufficient evidence regarding claims that Comcast charged for repairs that were claimed to be covered under the SPP.

In June 2018, Comcast was sued in a class action led by a consumer in Illinois, claiming that the company had "created the ability to purchase cell phones and order cell service through [the Xfinity Mobile] website using already established account information from customers’ Xfinity internet and cable accounts", and was charged for multiple fraudulent smartphone purchases made without their knowledge or consent. The suit was ruled to be solved in individual arbitration.

In November 2026, AT&T filed a lawsuit in the state of California, similarly contending that Comcast's marketing of its internet services as being "fiber-powered" or similar was misleading, as Xfinity utilizes hybrid fiber-coaxial (HFC) infrastructure for most customers and only provides "last mile" fiber to a small number of customers. The suit came following similar complaints with the BBB, which stated that Comcast had made accurate disclosures relating to the "fiber-powered" claim, but recommended that the statements be "more prominent and more proximate" to the claims in its marketing materials.

== Data breach ==
On December 20, 2023, it was revealed that an Xfinity data breach had exposed the personal data of 35.8 million people, including usernames, passwords, and answers to security questions, due to a vulnerability in the Citrix software used.
