= Level 3 Communications =

Defunct American multinational telecommunications and internet service provider

Level 3 Communications, Inc.
- Type: Public
- Traded as: NYSE: LVLT
- Industry: Telecom
- Founded: 1985; 41 years ago
- Defunct: November 1, 2017
- Fate: Acquired by CenturyLink (now Lumen Technologies)
- Successor: Lumen Technologies
- Headquarters: Broomfield, Colorado, United States
- Key people: James O. Ellis Jr. (chairman); Jeff Storey (CEO); Sunit Patel (CFO)
- Products: Mobile telephony, Internet services, Content delivery
- Revenue: ▲US$ 8.3 billion (2015)
- Operating income: ▲US$ 1.3 billion (2015)
- Net income: ▲US$3.4 billion (2015)
- Total assets: ▲US$24.1 billion (2015)
- Total equity: ▲US$10.1 billion (2015)
- Number of employees: 13,500
- ASNs: 3356, 1, 11213, 7911, 281, 10753, 594, 2551, 199, 560, 20476, 3549, 19094, 19591, 279, 30686, 189, 18756, 16852, 7176, 6395, 8043, 524, 19962, 200, 201, 202, 203, 595, 596, 597, 598, 3508, 3831, 4323, 6467, 6484, 7037, 22026, 26458, 32421
- Website: www.lumen.com

Level 3 Communications, Inc. was an American multinational telecommunications and internet service provider company headquartered in Broomfield, Colorado. It ultimately became a part of CenturyLink (now Lumen Technologies), where Level 3 President and CEO Jeff Storey was installed as Chief Operating Officer, becoming CEO of CenturyLink one year later in a prearranged succession plan.

Level 3 operated a Tier 1 network. The company provided core transport, IP, voice, video, and content delivery for medium-to-large internet carriers in North America, Latin America, Europe, and selected cities in Asia. Level 3 was also the largest competitive local exchange carrier (CLEC) and the 3rd largest provider of fiber-optic internet access (based on coverage) in the United States.

On October 31, 2016, CenturyLink announced an agreement to acquire Level 3 Communications in a cash and stock transaction. Level 3 became part of CenturyLink on November 1, 2017.

== History ==
=== 1985 to 2000 ===
In 1985, Peter Kiewit Sons' Inc created a subsidiary named Kiewit Diversified Group to manage the corporation's business that was not related to construction. The division was spun off as a separate entity and changed its name to Level 3 Communications in 1998 to signify an increased focus on communication services. That same year saw it make an IPO on NASDAQ. According to Level3's own history, it continued to build its telecommunications network after going public.

=== 2001 to 2010 ===
According to Level3's own history, in 2003, the company acquired Genuity, and, between 2005 and 2007, it purchased several other companies including former rivals WilTel Communications, Broadwing Corporation, Looking Glass Networks, Progress Telecom, and Telcove (formerly Adelphia Business Solutions). In 2004, Level 3 acquired ICG Communications' wholesale dial-up business for $35 million. Then, in 2006, Level 3 purchased the rest of ICG Communications for $163 million, taking over ICG's fiber network and nationwide Points of Presence (PoPs). It then integrated these companies through 2010.

=== 2010 to 2017 ===
On April 11, 2011, Level 3 announced a tender offer had been made to acquire fellow Tier 1 provider Global Crossing in an all-stock transaction, which was approved by shareholders on August 5, and completed on October 4, 2011. On October 20, 2011, Level 3 Communications reduced its total shares and transferred its stock listing from NASDAQ to the larger New York Stock Exchange.

On May 14, 2012, Level 3 was contracted by European content provider Voxility to provide 250 Gbit/s or more to Voxility's three main data centers in North America and Europe. On May 7, 2012, Level 3 was contracted by the U.S. Department of Defense's Defense Information Systems Agency to provide fiber-cable operations and maintenance, and IP-based infrastructure under a ten-year, indefinite contract with a maximum value of approximately $411 million.

On June 16, 2014, Level 3 acquired TW Telecom, a business internet connection provider, for about $5.7 billion.

In July 2015, Level 3 acquired Black Lotus, a provider of protection against distributed denial of service (DDoS).

On October 31, 2016, CenturyLink announced its intent to acquire Level 3 in a deal valued at around $34 billion.

On October 3, 2017, the deal was approved by the United States Department of Justice on condition of selling some of Level 3's telecom holdings in three states. The deal officially closed and Level 3 became part of CenturyLink on November 1, 2017.

On November 1, 2017, Level 3 Communications officially merged with CenturyLink. As part of the merger, work was required to divest of 24 individual fiber optic lines spanning 30 city pairs as required by the US Department of Justice. Additionally, Level 3 was required to divest of metro Ethernet markets in Boise, Tucson, and Albuquerque to satisfy antitrust requirements. The company complied with the divestiture of those assets.

== Operations ==
=== Network ===
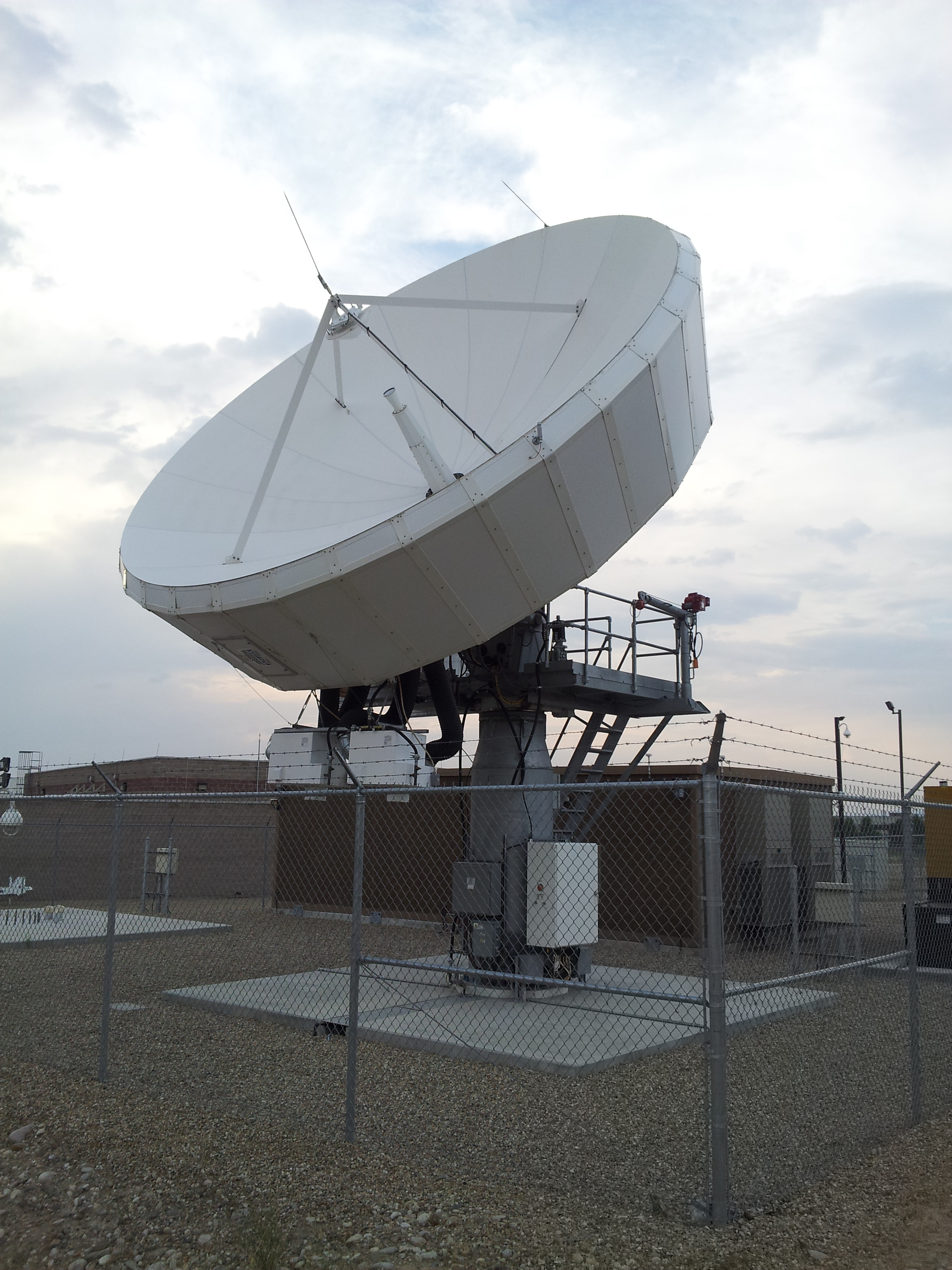
Level 3 Communications satellite dish on one of its two ground stations located in Boise, Idaho

Level 3 Communications operated a large network internet, with infrastructure in 46 states in the continental United States, South America, Western Europe, and some cities in Asia. It uses transatlantic cables, including "Yellow" /AC-2 (on which it owned two of the four fiber pairs after Viatel's 2001 bankruptcy). Level 3 Communications has also purchased 300 Gbit/s of capacity on the Apollo (cable system).

At the time of acquisition by CenturyLink, it was owner of AS1 (following the acquisition of Genuity, from BBN Technologies), but it used AS3356 for operations. AS3356 as of 2007 consistently had one of the highest ranked connectivity degrees on the internet. It also operated the former Global Crossing network (AS3549) following the company acquisition in 2011.

Level 3 Communications delivered Netflix and Apple music and video content over the internet. The company ran a content delivery network which it acquired from Savvis in 2006.

In 2006, Level 3 Communications announced with Internet2, an academic network, that they would deploy a next generation nationwide research network.

In 2016, Level 3 Communications finished merging the former TW Telecom network (AS4323) into the former Global Crossing Network (AS3549)

=== Sales organization ===
Level 3 distributed and sold its services through a mix of six independent sales channels: large enterprise, wholesale, federal, content and media, midmarket, and indirect. The top performing Level 3 indirect sales agencies in 2010 included Intelisys, Microcorp, CDW/AVANT Communications, PlanetOne, Advantage Communications Group, Telarus, and Presidio.

== Comcast dispute ==
On November 11, 2010 a dispute arose between Level 3 and Comcast, when Level 3 announced that they were "selected to serve as a primary content delivery network (CDN) provider for Netflix, Inc. to support the company's streaming functionality." Apparently, as a result of this distribution agreement, Comcast sought to renegotiate the peering agreement with Level 3 and sought a recurring fee for carrying the increased Level 3 internet traffic to and from Comcast broadband customers. Claims and counter-claims were made as the two companies sought to renegotiate the contract. In December 2010, the New America Foundation submitted information concerning the dispute to the FCC.

On July 16, 2013, Level 3 Communications and Comcast seemingly ended their three-year dispute by issuing a statement that "Level 3 and Comcast have resolved their prior interconnect dispute on mutually satisfactory terms. Details will not be released." On May 21, 2015, Level 3 and Comcast announced a new multi-year bilateral agreement to "enhance their existing network capacity while extending their mutual interconnection agreements, ensuring that both maintain ample capacity to exchange Internet traffic between their networks."

== Other disputes ==
In July 2013, the NSA was accused of wiretapping large parts of data on the German Internet Exchange Point DE-CIX which was denied by Level 3, and a few months later, was accused of tapping connections between Google and Yahoo data centers.

== See also ==
- List of United States telephone companies
