= Sales =

Activities related to the exchange of goods

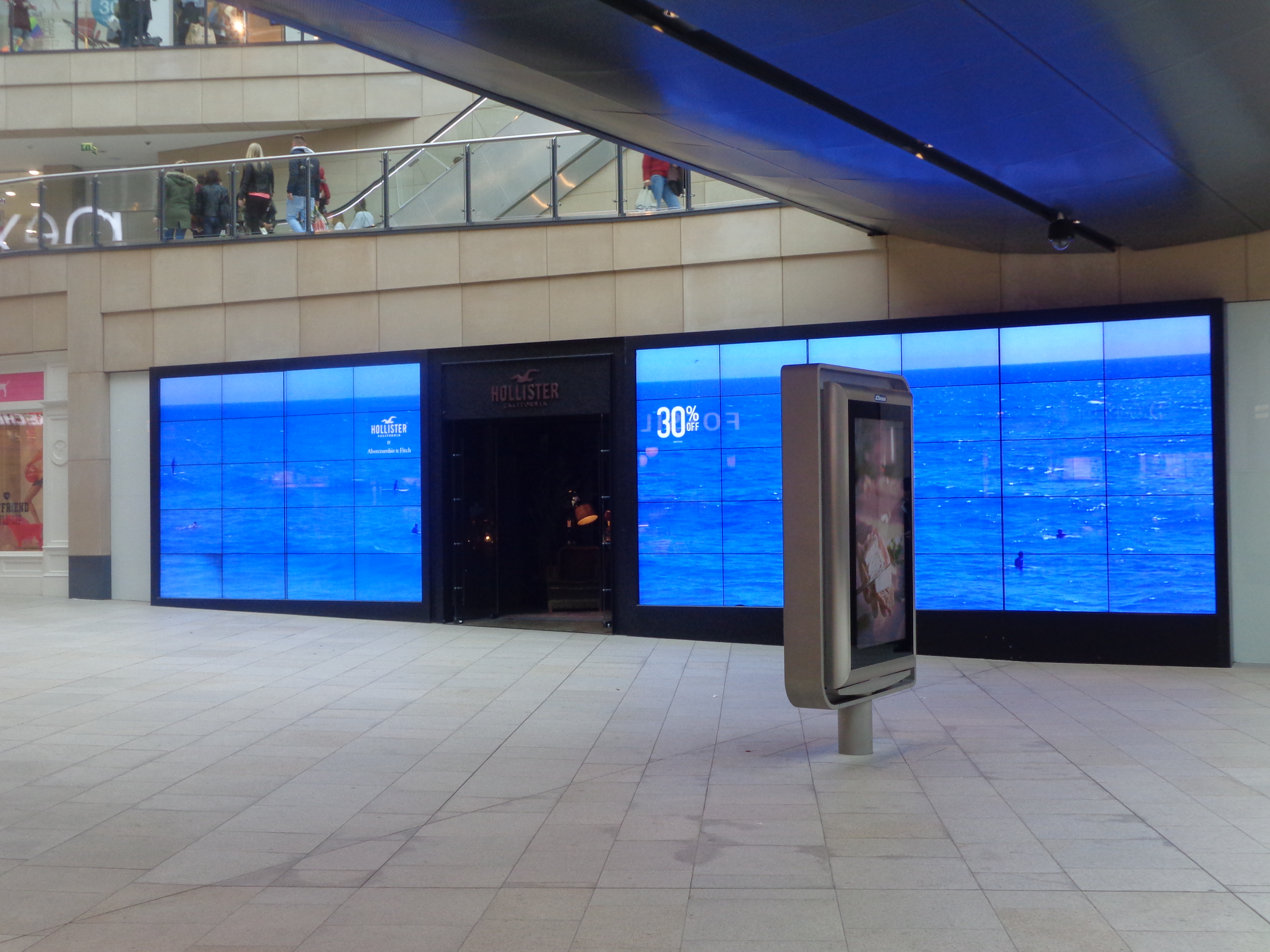
A Hollister Co. store in Leeds, England; the clothing retailing is a prominent sales market

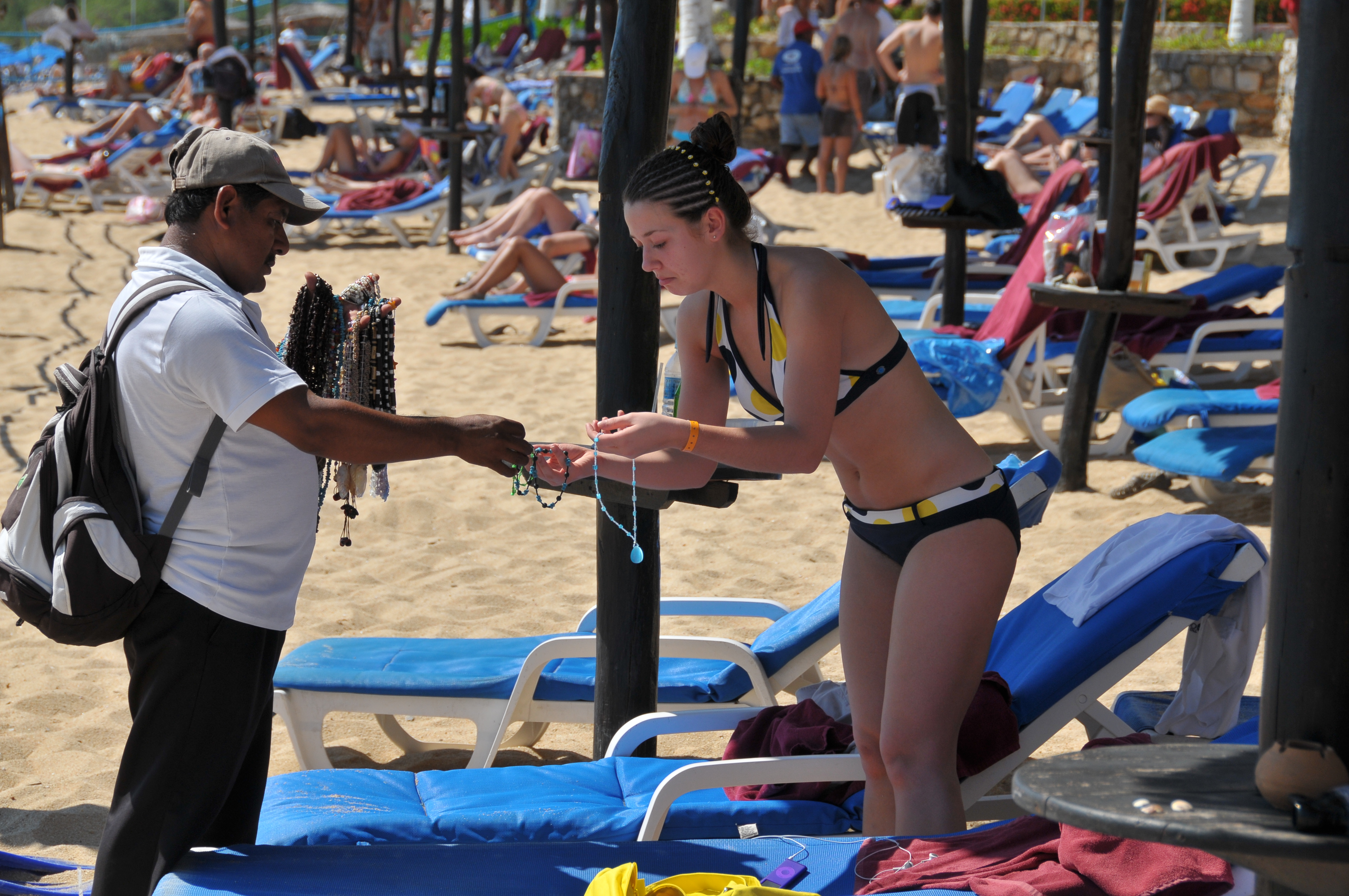
A beach salesman showing necklaces to a tourist in Mexico

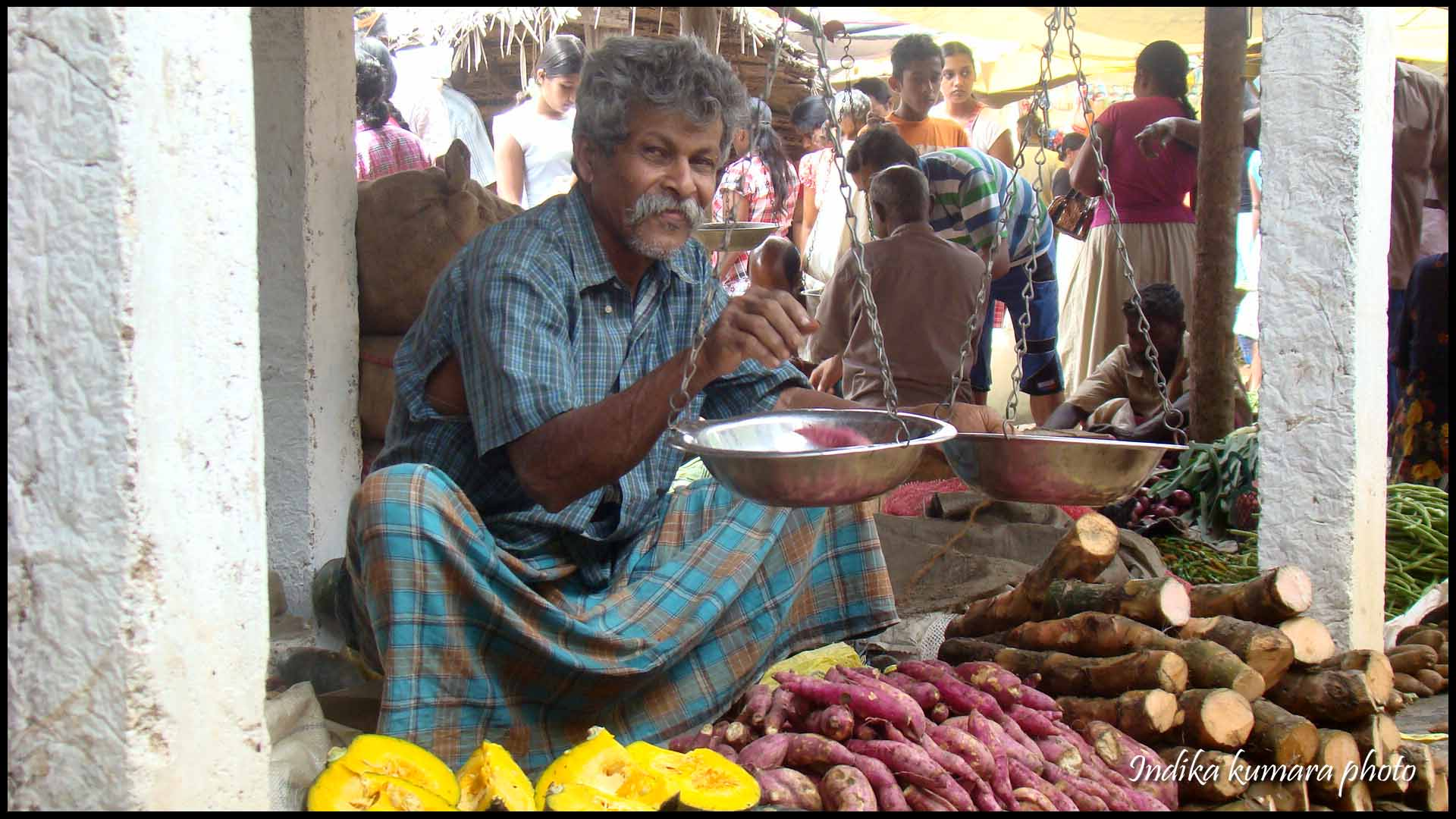
A vegetable seller in a rural Sri Lankan village

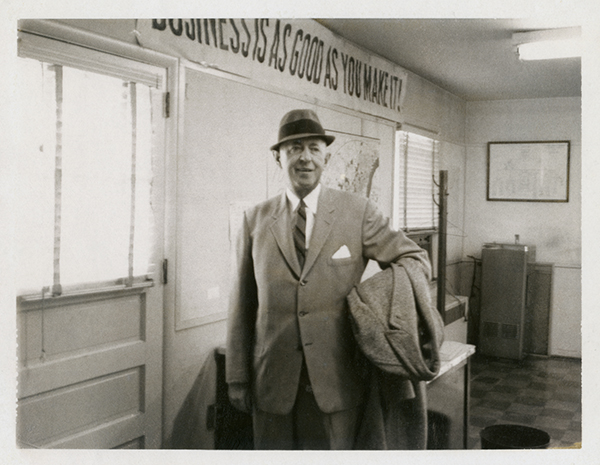
Franc Carr, salesperson c. 1965

Sales are commercial dealings in which a seller transfers ownership of products or provides services to a buyer in exchange for money or other agreed-upon consideration. The term may also refer to the quantity or monetary value of goods sold in a given targeted time period. The delivery of a service for a cost is also considered a sale. A period during which goods are sold for a reduced price may also be referred to as a "sale".

The seller, or the provider of the goods or services, completes a sale in an interaction with a buyer, which may occur at the point of sale or in response to a purchase order from a customer. There is a passing of title (property or ownership) of the item, and the settlement of a price, in which agreement is reached on a price for which transfer of ownership of the item will occur. The seller, not the purchaser, typically executes the sale and it may be completed prior to the obligation of payment. In the case of indirect interaction, a person who sells goods or service on behalf of the owner is known as a salesman or saleswoman or salesperson, but this often refers to someone selling goods in a store/shop, in which case other terms are also common, including salesclerk, shop assistant, and retail clerk.

In common law countries, sales are governed generally by the common law and commercial codes. In the United States, the laws governing sales of goods are mostly uniform to the extent that most jurisdictions have adopted Article 2 of the Uniform Commercial Code, albeit with some non-uniform variations.

== Definition ==
A person or organization expressing an interest in acquiring the offered item of value is referred to as a potential buyer, prospective customer, or prospect. Buying and selling are understood to be two sides of the same "coin" or transaction. Both seller and buyer engage in a process of negotiation to consummate the exchange of values. The exchange, or selling, process has implied rules and identifiable stages. It is implied that the selling process will proceed fairly and ethically so that the parties end up nearly equally rewarded. The stages of selling, and buying, involve getting acquainted, assessing each party's need for the other's item of value, and determining if the values to be exchanged are equivalent or nearly so, or, in buyer's terms, "worth the price". Sometimes, sellers have to use their own experiences when selling products with appropriate discounts.

Although the skills required are different, from a management viewpoint, sales is a part of marketing. Sales often form a separate grouping in a corporate structure, employing separate specialist operatives known as salespersons (singular: salesperson). Selling is considered by many to be a sort of persuading "art". Contrary to popular belief, the methodological approach of selling refers to a systematic process of repetitive and measurable milestones, by which a salesman relates his or her offering of a product or service in return enabling the buyer to achieve their goal in an economic way.

The sales process consists of a series of measurable milestones. However, the definition of selling is often unclear because of its close relationship with advertising, promotion, public relations, and direct marketing.

Selling is the profession-wide term, much like marketing defines a profession. Recently, attempts have been made to clearly understand who is in the sales profession, and who is not. There are many articles looking at marketing, advertising, promotions, and even public relations as ways to create a unique transaction.

Many believe that the focus of selling is on the human agents involved in the exchange between buyer and seller. Effective selling also requires a systems approach, at minimum involving roles that sell, enable selling, and develop sales capabilities. Selling also involves salespeople who possess a specific set of sales skills and the knowledge required to facilitate the exchange of value between buyers and sellers that is unique from marketing and advertising.

Within these three tenets, the following definition of professional selling is offered by the American Society for Training and Development (ASTD):

The holistic business system required to effectively develop, manage, enable, and execute a mutually beneficial, interpersonal exchange of goods or services for equitable value.

Team selling is one way to influence sales. Team selling is "a group of people representing the sales department and other functional areas in the firm, such as finance, production, and research and development". (Spiro) Team selling came about in the 1990s through total quality management (TQM). TQM occurs when companies work to improve their customer satisfaction by constantly improving all their operations.

=== Relationships with marketing ===
Marketing and sales differ greatly, but they generally have the same goal. Selling is the final stage in marketing which puts the plan into effect. A marketing plan includes pricing, promotion, place, and product (the 4 P's). A marketing department in an organization has the goals of increasing the desirability and value of the products and services to the customer and increasing the number and engagement of successful interactions between potential customers and the organization. Achieving this goal may involve the sales team using promotional techniques such as advertising, sales promotion, publicity, and public relations, creating new sales channels, or creating new products. It can also include encouraging the potential customer to visit the organization's website, contact the organization for more information, or interact with the organization via social media channels such as Twitter, Facebook and blogs. Social values play a major role in consumer decision processes. Marketing is the whole of the work on persuasion made for the whole of the target people. Sales is the process of persuasion and effort from one person to one person (B2C), or one person to a corporation (B2B), in order to make a living resource enter the company. This may occur in person, over the phone or digitally.

The field of sales process engineering views "sales" as the output of a larger system, not just as the output of one department. The larger system includes many functional areas within an organization. From this perspective, the labels "sales" and "marketing" cover several processes whose inputs and outputs supply one another. In this context, improving an "output" (such as sales) involves studying and improving the broader sales process, since the component functional areas interact and are interdependent.

Many large corporations structure their marketing departments so that they are integrated with other areas of the business. Marketing functions are often divided into specialized teams, each responsible for a particular objective, while managers coordinate their efforts to support organizational goals. For example, an inbound marketing campaign aims to attract potential customers and increase engagement with the company, providing additional opportunities for the sales department to convert prospects into customers. Effective marketing strategies also consider and address potential risks or challenges associated with these campaigns.

The sales department aims to improve the interaction between the customer and the sales channel or salesperson. As sales is at the forefront of any organization, this must take place before any other business process can begin. Sales management involves breaking down the selling process and increasing the effectiveness of its individual stages, as well as improving the interactions between them. For example, in an outbound sales environment, the typical process includes outbound calling, delivering the sales pitch, handling objections, identifying opportunities, and closing the sale. Each stage of the process presents sales-related challenges, skill requirements, and training needs, as well as marketing solutions that can improve the effectiveness of each individual step.

One further common complication of marketing is the difficulty in measuring results for some marketing initiatives. Some marketing and advertising executives focus on creativity and innovation without concern for the top or bottom lines – a fundamental pitfall of marketing for marketing's sake.

Many companies find it challenging to get their marketing and sales teams to agree. The two departments, although different in nature, handle similar concepts and have to work together to achieve the business's goals. Building a good relationship between the two teams that encourages communication can be the key to success.

=== Industrial marketing ===
The idea that marketing can potentially eliminate the need for salespeople depends entirely on context. For example, this may be possible in some B2C situations; however, for many B2B transactions (for example, those involving industrial organizations) this is mostly impossible. Another dimension is the value of the goods being sold. Fast-moving consumer-goods (FMCG) require no salespeople at the point of sale to get them to jump off the supermarket shelf and into the customer's trolley. However, the purchase of large mining equipment worth millions of dollars will require a salesperson to manage the sales process – particularly in the face of competitors. Small and medium businesses selling such large ticket items to a geographically dispersed client base use manufacturers' representatives to provide this highly personal service while avoiding the large expense of a captive sales force.

=== Sales and marketing alignment and integration ===
Another area of discussion involves the need for alignment and integration between corporate sales and marketing functions. According to a report by the Chief Marketing Officer (CMO) Council, only 40 percent of companies have formal programs, systems, or processes in place to align and integrate these two critical functions.

With the increase of the use of the internet today, sales functions of several enterprises are finding traditional methods of marketing quite old fashioned and less efficient. So the use of automated marketing applications is on the rise ranging from customer relationship management (CRM) to sales force management.

Traditionally, these two functions, as referred above, have operated separately, left in siloed areas of tactical responsibility. Glen Petersen's book The Profit Maximization Paradox sees the changes in the competitive landscape between the 1950s and the time of writing as so dramatic that the complexity of choice, price, and opportunities for the customer forced this seemingly simple and integrated relationship between sales and marketing to change forever. Petersen goes on to highlight that salespeople spend approximately 40 percent of their time preparing customer-facing deliverables while using less than 50 percent of the materials created by marketing, adding to perceptions that marketing is out of touch with the customer and that sales is resistant to messaging and strategy.

== The sales process ==
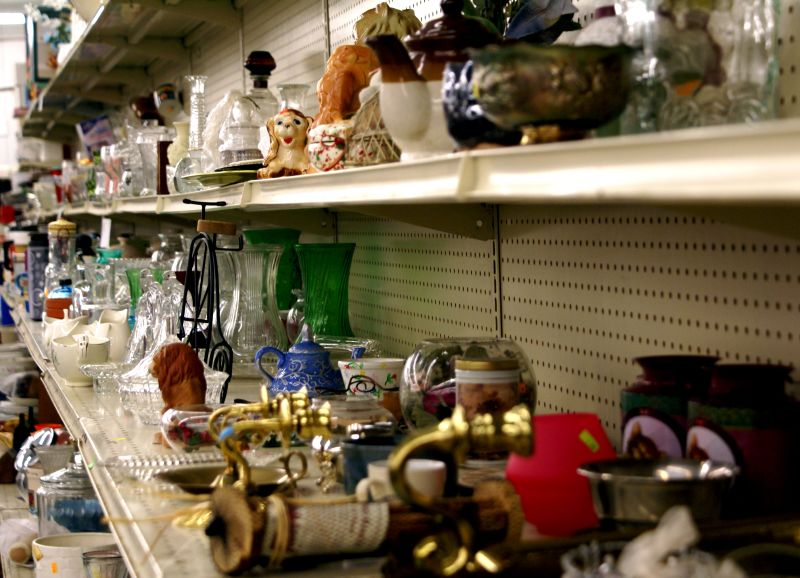
Used goods for sale at a charity shop

The sales process is a structured series of steps that a salesperson or sales organization follows to guide a prospect from initial awareness to a closed sale. While specific models can vary by industry and company, a typical sales process includes the following stages:

- Prospecting: The first step is to find potential customers (prospects). This can be done through various methods, including lead generation, market research, and networking.
- Qualifying: After identifying prospects, the salesperson determines if they have the need for the product, the financial ability to buy, and the authority to make a purchasing decision.
- Approach: This is the first point of contact with a qualified prospect. The goal is to build rapport, gather information, and set an appointment or discovery call.
- Presentation and demonstration: The salesperson presents the product or service, explaining how its features and benefits meet the specific needs of the prospect that were identified in earlier stages.
- Handling objections: Prospects will often have questions or concerns. In this stage, the salesperson addresses these objections to resolve any doubts.
- Closing: This stage involves asking the prospect for their business and gaining a commitment to purchase. Various sales closing techniques may be used.
- Follow-Up: After the sale is closed, the salesperson follows up to ensure customer satisfaction, address any issues, and potentially ask for referrals or future business.

== Methods ==
A sale can take place through face-to-face contact, via mail order, through a vending machine or through online selling. Other methods of selling include:

- Agency-based sales
  - Complex sales
  - Consignment
  - Consultative sales
  - Retail or consumer
  - Sales agents (for example in real estate or in manufacturing)
  - Sales outsourcing through direct branded representation
  - Telemarketing or telesales
  - Transaction sales
- Business-to-business – business-to-business ("B2B") sales are likely to be larger in terms of volume, economic value and complexity than business-to-consumer ("B2C") sales. Often the complexity involves one business working closely with the other to define problems, to finding solutions, to supporting after-sale operation. Because of this complexity, there is a need to manage the relationships between the buying and selling organizations, for example using Peter Cheverton's relationship models and the stakeholder map by Anderson, Bryson and Crosby
- Channel sales, an indirect sales model, which differs from direct sales. Channel selling is a way for sellers to reach the "B2B" and "B2C" markets through distributors, re-sellers or value added re-sellers (VARs).
- Direct sales, involving person to person contact
- Electronic
  - Electronic data interchange
  - Web – Business-to-business ("B2B") and business-to-consumer ("B2C")
- Pro forma sales
- Request for proposal – An invitation for suppliers, through a bidding process, to submit a proposal on a specific product or service; an RFP usually represents part of a complex sales process, also known as "enterprise sales"
- Selling technique:
  - Action selling
  - Aggressive selling
  - Auctions
  - Challenger sales
  - Cold calling
  - Collaborative selling
  - Compass selling
  - Conceptual selling
  - Consultative selling
  - Cross-selling
  - Guaranteed sale
  - Hard selling
  - Inbound sales
  - Needs-based selling
  - Paint-the-picture
  - Personal selling
  - Persuasive selling
  - Price based selling
  - Professional selling skills
  - Relationship selling
  - Reverse selling
  - Sales enablement
  - Sales game changer system
  - Sales habits
  - Sales negotiation
  - Sales outsourcing
  - Sandler selling system
  - Short selling
  - Side selling
  - Social selling
  - Solution selling
  - SPIN selling
  - Strategic selling
  - Take-out or take away
  - Target account selling
  - Transactional selling
  - Upselling
- Traveling salesman
  - Door-to-door methods
  - Hawking

=== Sales agents ===
Agents in the sales process can represent either of two parties in the sales process; for example:

- Buyers broker or buyer brokerage: This is where the salesman represents the consumer making the purchase. This is most often applied in large transactions.
- Disclosed dual agent: This is where the salesman represents both parties in the sale and acts as a mediator for the transaction. The role of the salesman here is to oversee that both parties receive an honest and fair deal.
- Internet sales professionals: These people are primarily responsible for ensuring immediate response to the leads generated via social media, website or email campaigns.
- Sales broker, seller agency, seller agent, seller representative: This is a traditional role where the salesman represents a person or company on the selling end of a deal.
- Sales managers aim to implement various sales strategies and management techniques in order to facilitate improved profits and increased sales volume. They are also responsible for coordinating the sales and marketing department as well as oversight concerning the fair and honest execution of the sales process by their agents.
- Sales outsourcing involves direct branded representation where the sales representatives are recruited, hired, and managed by an external entity but hold quotas, represent themselves as the brand of the client, and report all activities (through their own sales management channels) back to the client. It is akin to a virtual extension of a sales force (see sales outsourcing).
- Salesperson: The primary function of salespeople is to generate and close business resulting in profit. The salesperson will accomplish their primary function through a variety of means including phone calls, email, social media, networking, and cold calling. The primary objective of the successful salesperson is to find the consumers to sell to. Sales are often referred to as a "numbers game" because a general law of averages and pattern of successful closing of business will emerge through heightened sales activity. These activities include but are not limited to: locating prospects, fostering relationships with prospects, building trust with future clients, identifying and filling needs of consumers, and therefore turning prospective customers into actual ones. Many tools are used by successful salespeople, the most important of which is questioning which can be defined as a series of questions and resulting answers allowing the salesperson to understand a customer's goals and requirements relevant to the product they are selling. The creation of value or perceived value is the result of taking the information gathered, analyzing the goals and needs of the prospective customer and leveraging the products or services the salesperson's firm represents or sells in a way that most effectively achieves the prospective client's goals or suits their needs. Effective salespeople will package their offering and present their proposed solution in a way that leads the prospective customer to the conclusion that they acquire the solution, resulting in revenue and profit for the salesperson and the organization they represent.

=== Inside sales vs. outside sales ===
In the United States, the Fair Labor Standards Act defines outside sales representatives as "employees [who] sell their employer's products, services, or facilities to customers away from their employer's place(s) of business, in general, either at the customer's place of business or by selling door-to-door at the customer's home" while defining those who work "from the employer's location" as inside sales. Inside sales generally involves attempting to close business primarily over the phone via telemarketing, while outside sales (or "field" sales) will usually involve initial phone work to book sales calls at the potential buyer's location to attempt to close the deal in person. Some companies have an inside sales department that works with outside representatives and book their appointments for them. Inside sales sometimes refers to upselling to existing customers.

=== Sales coaching ===
Sales coaching is a one-on-one coaching process by high-performing sales professionals and consultants with salespeople, managers, and executives. The process involves equipping them with the knowledge, abilities, and skills needed to become more effective sales professionals. Unlike sales training, sales coaching is typically an individualized, ongoing endeavor.

== Law ==
In common law countries, sales are governed generally by the common law and commercial codes. In the United States, the laws governing sales of goods are mostly uniform to the extent that most jurisdictions have adopted Article 2 of the Uniform Commercial Code, albeit with some non-uniform variations.

The European Commission proposed adoption of a Common European Sales Law in 2011 and set out a proposed regulation on this area of law in 2014. Whilst remaining optional, the Commission's intention was to offer traders a means of breaking down barriers occasioned by the different legal systems of its (then) 28 member states. A 2012 Communication from the Commission argued that a Common European Sales Law would help to address some of the concerns which it had identified in the development of a market for cloud computing services. However, the proposal was withdrawn in December 2014 when the Commission's work plan was rationalised.

== See also ==
- Buzzword
- Choice architecture
- Demand chain
- Financial transaction
- Personal selling
- Sales (accounting)
- Purchasing
- Sales contest
- Sales effectiveness
- Sales incentive plan
- Sales territory
- Sales variance
- Trade
- Vendor
