= Telcove =

TelCove was a medium-sized telecommunications founded in 1991 and based in Coudersport, Pennsylvania. TelCove was originally known as Hyperion. It later changed its name to Adelphia Business Solutions, but it changed its name again after internal corruption forced the parent company, Adelphia, to file for bankruptcy. TelCove was once known as Adelphia Business Solutions and was part of Adelphia Communications. Since 2004, the company had been majority-owned by Bay Harbour Management.

In 2006, TelCove was acquired by Level 3 Communications for US$1.2375 billion, consisting of US$637 million in shares of Level 3 common stock, US$445 million in cash and US$155.5 million in the assumption of debt.

In 2017, Level 3 Communications was acquired by CenturyLink.
