= Sales contest =

A sales contest is a motivational program in which rewards are offered to sales people based upon their sales and/or results. There are three types:

- Direct competition — the sales people compete against each other and there is one winner
- Team competition — there are teams which are rewarded collectively for winning.
- Goal — rewards are given for achieving goals which may be won by more than one person
