= Jeffrey Storey =

American business executive (born 1960)

Jeffrey K. Storey (born May 12, 1960) is an American business executive whose career has focused on the telecommunications industry. He was the president and chief executive officer of Level 3 Communications between April 11, 2013, and the company's acquisition by CenturyLink in 2017, at which point he became president and COO of the combined company. He became CEO of CenturyLink on June 1, 2018. On September 13, 2022, Lumen announced that Kate Johnson had been appointed CEO and president by the company's board of directors, and that Storey would retire on November 7, 2022.

== Life and career ==
Storey, whose parents worked in the construction and airline industries, grew up in Texas and eastern Oklahoma. He was educated at Northeastern State University, where he received a bachelor's degree with a major in engineering, physics and mathematics, and at Southern Methodist University, where he received a master's degree in telecommunications systems. He began his career in telecommunications in 1983 at Southwestern Bell Telephone.

During the 1990s, Storey worked for Cox Communications in a variety of positions, including vice president of commercial services, and vice president and general manager of Cox Fibernet. In 1999, he joined WilTel Communications, eventually becoming its president and CEO in 2002. He remained in that position until 2005, when the company was sold to Level 3 Communications. He was brought into Level 3 Communications by its long-time CEO Jim Crowe in 2008 to serve as its president and chief operating officer (COO), and was the architect of the company's 2011 acquisition of Global Crossing. When Crowe stepped down in 2013, Storey succeeded him as CEO.

Storey, who also owns a ranch in Oklahoma, is married with six children.
