= Complex sales =

Complex sales, also known as enterprise sales, can refer to a method of trading sometimes used by organizations when procuring large contracts for goods and/or services, where the customer takes control of the selling process by issuing a request for proposal (RFP) and requiring a proposal response from previously identified or interested suppliers. Complex sales involve long sales cycles with multiple decision makers. Multiple stakeholders and stakeholder groups contribute to every complex sale. These types of sales can take up to 8 to 18 months, as multiple people from higher management are involved.

== Description ==
Any product or service may become a complex sale. In some instances, a complex sale occurs when the market is mature and the stakes are high enough to warrant attention from a variety of stakeholders in the buying organization. In other instances a complex sales process is needed when the buyer has never had experience with the vendor, technology being sold, or if the solution is business critical or impacts the buying organization on a strategic level. The series of filters, purchasing steps, and stakeholders involved are designed to reduce the risks associated with making the wrong buying decision.

Often the need to have multiple stakeholders or buyers involved relates to the level of risk that is involved in the purchase or sale of goods and/or services. As the buyer or buying organization if the purchase only impacts a small group of people or component of the buying organization then often the decision is made by one buyer and the process tends to be quite transactional.

If the purchase impacts the entire organization, affects the company strategically, or can change the buyer business process then often the sales person is required to have a set of skills that are more in line with a subject matter expert or consultant than a traditional sales person. This type of sales person can often be referred to as a Key Account Executive or Complex Sales Executive.

Large or complex sales opportunities that are international in nature require an additional set of personal and sales skills. The need for cross-cultural awareness may add an additional layer of complexity in the sales process.

The larger the purchase and the buyer risk the more trust and credibility required from the vendor. As a Key Account Executive or Complex Sales Executive in addition to product knowledge and consultative selling skills top producing sales executives also have the ability to build strong client relationships and navigate and avoid the political pitfalls within client organizations.

== Forms of complex sales ==
- Selling consulting engineering services
- Facility Management bids including provision of soft and hard FM services
- Enterprise technology sales such as CRM or POS solutions
- Private data networks such as MPLS
- Commercial insurance sales
- Real Estate development
- Large fleet vehicle sales
- Mining equipment sales (e.g. Caterpillar tractors and large tunnel boring machines)
- Scientific Solution Sales (Data analysis and management)
- Government acquisition such as for military hardware and services
- Building management systems
- Security systems

== Sales controlling ==
Due to the high costs of proposals in complex sales the hit rate, i.e. the percentage of successful offers, is a valuable indicator of the performance of the sales force.

== Sales methods ==
Because of the large amounts involved, complex sales generally have considerable resources, strategies, and tools devoted to improving the chances of winning these contracts. Consulting companies provide services and develop trademarked methods to support these proposals and sales

=== Tools ===
The primary tools for complex sales are customer relationship management (CRM) tools. Other important tools calculate the value of the sale - often in terms of the return on investment (ROI) or total cost of ownership (TCO). Another class of selling tools are configure, price and quote (CPQ). In some cases these tools are provided as part of a more comprehensive enterprise resource planning (ERP) system.

== Limitation of complex sales ==
By analysing the characteristics of 'stellar performers', Dixon and Adamson argued that building strong personal and professional relationships and advocates among customers was no longer the most important success factor for selling. On the contrary, nearly 40% of 'stellar performer's were sellers who pushed their thinking and were not afraid to share even controversial views with both their customers and bosses.

== See also ==
- AIDA
- Contract of sale
- Industrial marketing
- List of marketing topics
- Marketing
- Promotion
- Tendering
