= Smart pipe =

Smart pipe, related to a mobile network operator (MNO or operator), refers to an operator's network that leverages existing or unique service capabilities and the operator's customer relationships to provide value beyond data connectivity. The term "smart" refers to the operator's ability to add value through services and content beyond bandwidth and network speed alone.

Among the commonly understood operational models for an MNO are smart pipes, walled gardens, and dumb pipes.

== Examples ==
The smart pipe term lacks a formal definition. However, operators, bloggers, and researchers have offered generally accepted aspects of a smart pipe.

Network operator 3 led the way with the release of its X-Series line of devices in 2006. The X-Series platform bundles services, several of which were unique to 3, and provided unlimited data access in exchange for a fixed premium.

In addition to pricing, services commonly viewed as parts of a smart pipe include:

- Location-based services
- Presence information
- Customer analytics
- Computing platforms, mobile or application
  - Mobile operating systems
- User interfaces
- Personalization
- Application programming interfaces (APIs), for devices or networks
- Payment, Billing
- Directory assistance, directory services
- Quality of service

By exposing these services to the mobile ecosystem, network operators preserve the value of their pipes while enabling entrepreneurs to create new business models and generate revenue streams.

The need for operators to innovate around a smart pipe is rising as they face rising pressure from media companies and new technologies, such as Apple's iPhone, Nokia's consumer portal Ovi, and the open-access policies of the U.S. Federal Communications Commission (FCC).

== See also ==
- Mobile phone
- Mobile network operator
- Walled garden (technology)
- Dumb pipe
