= Dumb pipe =

Type of data network

A dumb pipe or dumb network, in relation to a mobile network operator (MNO) or Internet service provider (ISP), is a simple network that has high enough bandwidth to transfer bytes between the customer's device and the Internet without the need to prioritize content. This means it can afford to be completely neutral with regard to the services and applications the customer accesses.

This is in contrast to a smart pipe where the operator affects the customer's accessibility of the Internet by either limiting the available services or applications to its own proprietary portal (like a walled garden) or offer additional capabilities and services beyond simple connectivity. A dumb pipe primarily provides simple bandwidth and network capacity which is greater than the maximum network loads expected thus avoiding the need to discriminate between packet types.

Among the commonly understood operational models for an MNO are dumb pipes, smart pipes, and the walled gardens.

== Description ==
A dumb network is marked by using intelligent devices (e.g. computers) at the periphery that make use of a network that does not interfere with or manage an application's operation / communication. The dumb network concept is the natural outcome of the end-to-end principle. The Internet was originally designed to operate as a dumb network.

In some circles the dumb network is regarded as a natural culmination of technological progress in network technology. With the justification that the dumb network uniquely satisfies the requirements of the end to end principle for application creation, supporters see the dumb network as uniquely qualified for this purpose, as – by design – it is not sensitive to the needs of applications. The dumb network model can, in some ways, allow for flexibility and ease of innovation in the development of applications that is not matched by other models.

== Opinions ==
=== Criticism ===
Critics of dumb network architecture posit two arguments in favor of intelligent networks. The first, that certain users and transmission needs of certain applications are more important than others and thus should be granted greater network priority or quality of service. An example is that of real-time video applications that are more time sensitive than say, text applications. Thus video transmissions would receive network priority to prevent picture skips, while text transmissions could be delayed without significantly affecting its application performance. The second is that networks should be able to defend against malware and cyberattacks.

=== Support ===
Advocates of dumb networks counter the first argument by pointing out that prioritizing network traffic is very expensive in monetary, technology, and network performance. Dumb networks advocates also consider the real purpose for prioritizing network traffic is to overcome insufficient bandwidth to handle traffic and not a network protocol issue. The security argument is that malware is an end-to-end problem and thus should be dealt with at the endpoints and that attempting to adapt the network to counterattacks is both cumbersome and inefficient.

"In a world of dumb terminals and telephones, networks had to be smart. But in a world of smart terminals, networks have to be dumb."

— George Gilder, The Coming of the Fibersphere, Forbes ASAP, December 7, 1992

== See also ==
- Closed platform
- Quality of service
- Series of tubes
- Smart pipe
