= Telarus =

American sales agency

Telarus, LLC.
- Type: Private
- Industry: Commercial telecommunications
- Founded: May 12, 2002
- Headquarters: Sandy, Utah, United States
- Key people: Adam V. Edwards (co-Founder, CEO); Patrick K. Oborn (co-Founder); Richard A. Murray (co-Owner, COO); Dan Pirigyi (SVP of Strategic Partnerships)
- Products: Network, cloud, unified communications, cybersecurity, contact center services, GeoQuote telecommunications service analysis software
- Services: Technology Solutions Brokerage of commercial telecom and cloud-based products
- Number of employees: 386
- Website: www.telarus.com

Telarus is an American-based privately held technology services distributor that holds contracts with commercial network, cloud, CX, and cybersecurity providers with its operations in Australia, Canada, the United Kingdom, and the United States.

== History ==
Telarus was founded in June 2002 in Huntington Beach, California by Adam Edwards and Patrick Oborn. The focus of the company was to offer improved service to commercial telecommunications clients.

Operating originally as a telecommunications broker, Telarus generated leads using web and search engine marketing. They followed up on each lead, contacted the T1 carrier for pricing, and compiled each quote by hand.

In 2003, Oborn designed the initial concept for what was to be called GeoQuote, described as a software that allows a user to access multiple carrier price options with a single search. Oborn partnered with Aaron Lieberman to write the code that could compute pricing based upon loop distance (the distance from the customer's central office to the carrier point of presence) or through direct access to a carrier pricing Application Programming Interface (API).

The prototype of GeoQuote was completed in August 2003. The software was embedded in Telarus' research tool, named ShopforT1.com.

On September 30, 2004, Telarus filed a non-provisional patent application, which was accepted by the United States Patent and Trademark Office on February 24, 2009. GeoQuote is now protected by US Patent Number(s) 7,496,184 and 7,916,844.

In 2008, the company announced that it was adding the world's first fiber route mapping capabilities to GeoQuote.

In May 2022, Telarus launched SolutionVue, a software that offers detailed consulting advice through a series of discovery questions.

In April 2025, Telarus launched HUB, an all‑in‑one business management platform for technology advisors replacing the old Agent Back Office (ABO). Built on the SalesForce.com platform, Telarus Hub was designed as a central portal where advisors run their entire Telarus-facing business: managing pipeline, quotes, orders, commissions, training, and supplier engagement in one place.

== Acquisitions ==
In 2015, Telarus acquired the VXSuite assets of LVM, Inc., and begun offering free monitoring on all carrier circuits sold through their supplier agreements. Telarus also incorporated several members of the VXSuite management team into its own.

In 2017, Telarus acquired rival TSD, CarrierSales, in an all-stock transaction. The deal increased both the staff and revenue of Telarus by 50%, making it the largest privately held Technology Solutions Brokerage in the United States. Richard Murray, president of CarrierSales, was appointed COO of the combined Telarus.

On June 21, 2022, Telarus announced the acquisition of Telecom Consulting Group (TCG), a rival TSD headquartered in Ft Lauderdale, Florida. The deal brought 85 new employees to Telarus, raising the total number of staff to 400, making Telarus the largest TSB both by employee size and new sales revenue. Dan Pirigyi, former president of TCG, was appointed as SVP of Strategic Partnerships of Telarus upon completion of the transaction.

On September 14, 2022, Telarus announced the acquisition of Teladvocate, a regional TSD headquartered in Tampa, FL.

On November 16, 2023, Telarus announced the acquisition of Americomm, a regional TSD headquartered in Nashville, TN.

== Value Added Services ==
Customer Success Management - In 2014 Telarus launched its Customer Base Management program. Under the partner's brand, Telarus staff communicate directly with customers to help them resolve billing issues, make changes to their account, and to place orders for new services.

Sales Engineering - In 2018 Telarus began hiring technicians known as 'Sales Engineers' to provide technical guidance, design, and vendor selection advice. Josh Lupresto was named SVP of Sales Engineering in 2018, and leads the team of Solution Architects, Sales Engineering, and Inside Engineers.

Financial Services - In 2019 Telarus launched the Telarus Capital Program, a financial services offering in which sales partners can borrow money or sell their recurring revenue to Telarus in exchange for a lump sum. The loan program is called "AnticiPAY" and the program in which agents sell a slice of their commissions to Telarus is called "FlexPAY".

Project Management - In 2020 Telarus launched its Project Management-as-a-Service program. By assuming central control of complex service delivery, the Telarus team hopes to ensure timely and correct installation of technology infrastructure services purchased through its contracts.

== Outside Investment ==
Columbia Capital - On December 1, 2020, Telarus announced that it had partnered with Columbia Capital, a private equity firm specializing in internet infrastructure, enterprise IT, and mobility solution investments. The deal gives Columbia Capital a minority stake in the company and represents the first time the three main owners (Edwards, Oborn, and Murray) have sold stock to an outside firm. The company plans to use their new access to capital to grow both organically and inorganically.

== International expansion ==
Australia - In August 2018 Telarus launched its brand in Australia under the name "Tradewinds Technology Brokerage".

Canada - In July 2019 Telarus announced it had expanded into Canada.

Europe - In October 2019, Telarus expanded into the U.K.
