= Sales outsourcing =

Indirect sales process

Sales outsourcing refers to indirect sales process through which the seller sells products or services to buyers while making some profits.

== Purpose of indirect sales ==
The sole purpose of a contract sales organization is to provide sales resource to its clients, without taking title to their products. Sales outsourcing providers include manufacturers' representatives, contract sales organizations, sales agents or SO outsourcing consultants. One way of organising the sales effort, especially when product delivery is erratic, is to replace or supplement internal resources with functionality and expertise brought in from contract sales organisations.

SO outsourcing is quite different from large-scale service outsourcing, which has its advantages but also requires pro-active contract and relationship management. In addition to full sales outsourcing, many partial models are observed, particularly in large firms.

== Advantages ==
SO is expected to be cheaper than the fully loaded cost of employing salespeople, but calculating the cost comparison over time is far from straightforward. Nevertheless, replacing fixed costs with variable costs is attractive to budget-holders. However, unlike many forms of outsourcing, the advantages of sales outsourcing does not often come from saving costs but rather increasing revenue or providing speed of response or flexibility.

The business case for sales outsourcing should also include consideration of the cost of controlling the contract. Difficulty in measuring the link between sales activity and sales performance leads to a preference for employed salespeople. However, the issues internally are often the same and the internal hire has many other corporate "distractions" that do not occur with external resources.

Companies may also choose sales outsourcing as a means of accessing the best sales skills. Although the pejorative term “rent-a-rep” is still used, there is some evidence that contractors are perceived as good performers against qualitative as well as quantitative performance criteria. Even so, the reputational risk of third parties handling customer relationships has been observed as a factor restricting sales outsourcing. One could argue that an employee is often using a company to gain 2–3 years salary and experience whereas a sales outsourcing firm would usually be looking at a long-term contract even though the staff may change during that time. So the aims of an outsourcer can be closely aligned with the aims and objectives of the contracting company.

A recent study has highlighted flexibility as an important driver for outsourcing sales. Uncertain business environments accentuate the need to turn sales resource on and off quickly. Industries and companies undergoing rapid change may need to avoid hiring and firing costs and risks. Contract sales organizations can absorb employment risk, enabling their clients to respond to short-term opportunities or competitor activity (see Lean startup). However, an outsourcer may build in more of a premium to the rate or commission if excessive flexibility is required on a contract.

Contract sales organizations are growing in volume and influence, able to provide both tactical activity and long-term strategic support to their clients.

Speed of response is seen as a key reason to use an outsourcer. If a company was looking to enter a market it may take several months to recruit the local manager which then takes several months to find an office and build a team. With an outsourcer, a full working team can oftentimes be operational within a matter of days or weeks.

Sales outsourcing can also be used as a market entry strategy and avoids permanent establishment risk. The sales outsourcing is gaining popularity among the startups in venturing into a new market. The primary reason being the increasing number of technology based startups around the globe where no physical product is involved. The startups working with limited resources can do a quick market validation by hiring temporary sales force in the targeted market.

== Indirect sales growth rate ==
The experience of many organizations over the past several years demonstrates that indirect channels can be critical to expanding market coverage. This has been particularly true in the electronics, communications and high tech sectors. For example, the indirect channel now accounts for 66 percent of overall technology sales, up from 53 percent in 1997.

The U.S. B2B technology market experienced 6% dollar growth in 2018. During the period, hardware represented 73% of revenue and grew 5%, while software represented 27% of revenue and grew 11%.
